= Doberlug-Kirchhain station =

Railway station in Doberlug-Kirchhain, Germany

Doberlug-Kirchhain
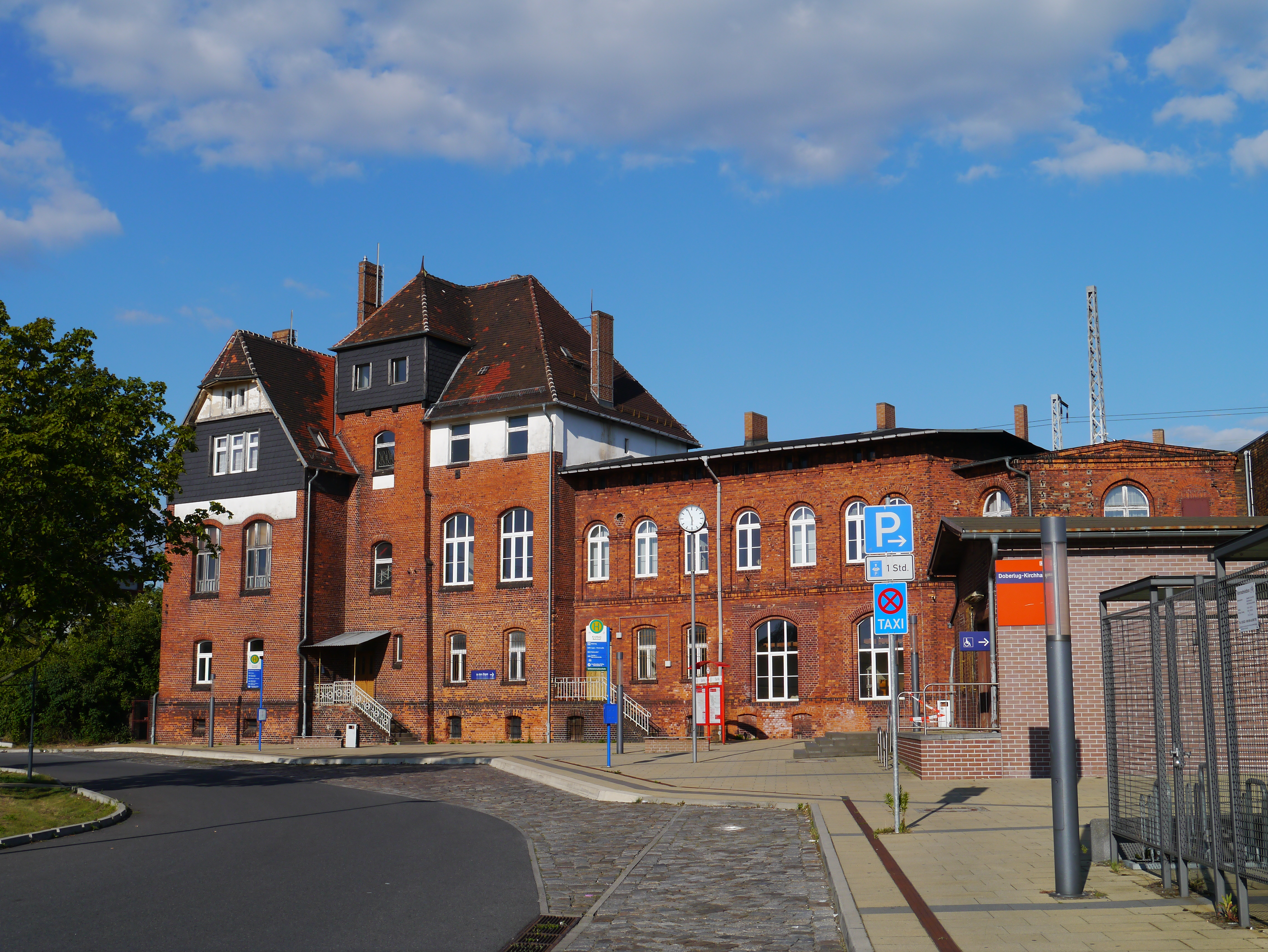
- The station in 2012 after the upgrade

General information
- Location: Doberlug-Kirchhain, Brandenburg; Germany
- Coordinates: 51°37′14″N 13°33′51″E
- Owner: Deutsche Bahn
- Operator: DB Netz; DB Station&Service
- Lines: Berlin–Dresden railway; Halle–Cottbus railway
- Platforms: 4
- Tracks: 4

Construction
- Accessible: Platforms 2 & 3 only

Other information
- Station code: 1240
- DS100 code: BDKO (upper) BDKU (lower)
- Category: 4
- Fare zone: : 7558
- Website: www.bahnhof.de

History
- Opened: 17 June 1875

Services
| Preceding station | Ostdeutsche Eisenbahn | Following station |
|---|---|---|
| Walddrehna towards Wismar | RE 8 | Rückersdorf towards Elsterwerda |
| Preceding station | DB Regio Nordost | Following station |
| Falkenberg (Elster) towards Leipzig Hbf | RE 10 | Finsterwalde (Niederlausitz) towards Frankfurt (Oder) |
| Schönborn bei Doberlug towards Herzberg (Elster) | RB 43 | Finsterwalde (Niederlausitz) towards Frankfurt (Oder) |
Location

Doberlug-Kirchhain (German: Bahnhof Doberlug-Kirchhain) is a bi-level railway station in the town of Doberlug-Kirchhain, Brandenburg, Germany. The station lies of the Berlin–Dresden railway and Halle–Cottbus railway and the train services are operated by Deutsche Bahn and Ostdeutsche Eisenbahn.

== History ==
The Halle-Sorau-Guben Railway Company (Halle-Sorau-Gubener Eisenbahn, HSGE) opened the Cottbus–Falkenberg/Elster section of the Halle–Cottbus railway on 1 December 1871. The town's original station building in the town, which was called Dobrilugk-Kirchhain, is now called the Alter Bahnhof (old station). It was used until the late 20th century as a residential building and Bahnmeisterei (the premises of the supervisor of track maintenance).

On 17 June 1875, the Berlin–Dresden railway was opened together with the two-level interchange station (Turmbahnhof or “tower station”) at the intersection with the line from Leipzig and Falkenberg to Cottbus. The two lines were doubled in 1890 and 1909 and they and were both electrified between 1980 and 1989. A decentralised rail traction current converter plant built on the railway bridge on the line towards Frankena supplied electricity to sections of both lines. It was closed after 27 years of operation in July 2008 and replaced by a modern substation. In the 1980s, it was planned to upgrade the station as a node with multiple tracks on each line; this is shown by a widened abutment to the bridge at the railway junction. After the reunification of Germany, this plan was not implemented.

Doberlug-Kirchhain station is classifies as a Category 4 station. It was rebuilt to enable use by the disabled in 2007.

== Rail services ==
The station is served by the following service:

| Line | Route | Frequency (min) |
|---|---|---|
| RE 8 | Elsterwerda – Doberlug-Kirchhain – Luckau-Uckro – Wünsdorf-Waldstadt – Südkreuz – Berlin Hbf – Spandau – Nauen – Wittenberge – Schwerin – Wismar | 120 |
| RE 10 | Leipzig – Torgau – Doberlug-Kirchhain – Finsterwalde – Cottbus – Jänschwalde – Eisenhüttenstadt – Frankfurt (Oder) | 60 |
| RB 43 | Falkenberg – Doberlug-Kirchhain – Finsterwalde – Cottbus – Jänschwalde – Eisenhüttenstadt – Frankfurt (Oder) | 120 |
