= Jüterbog–Röderau railway =

Railway line in Germany

Jüterbog–Zeithain Bogendreieck junction railway
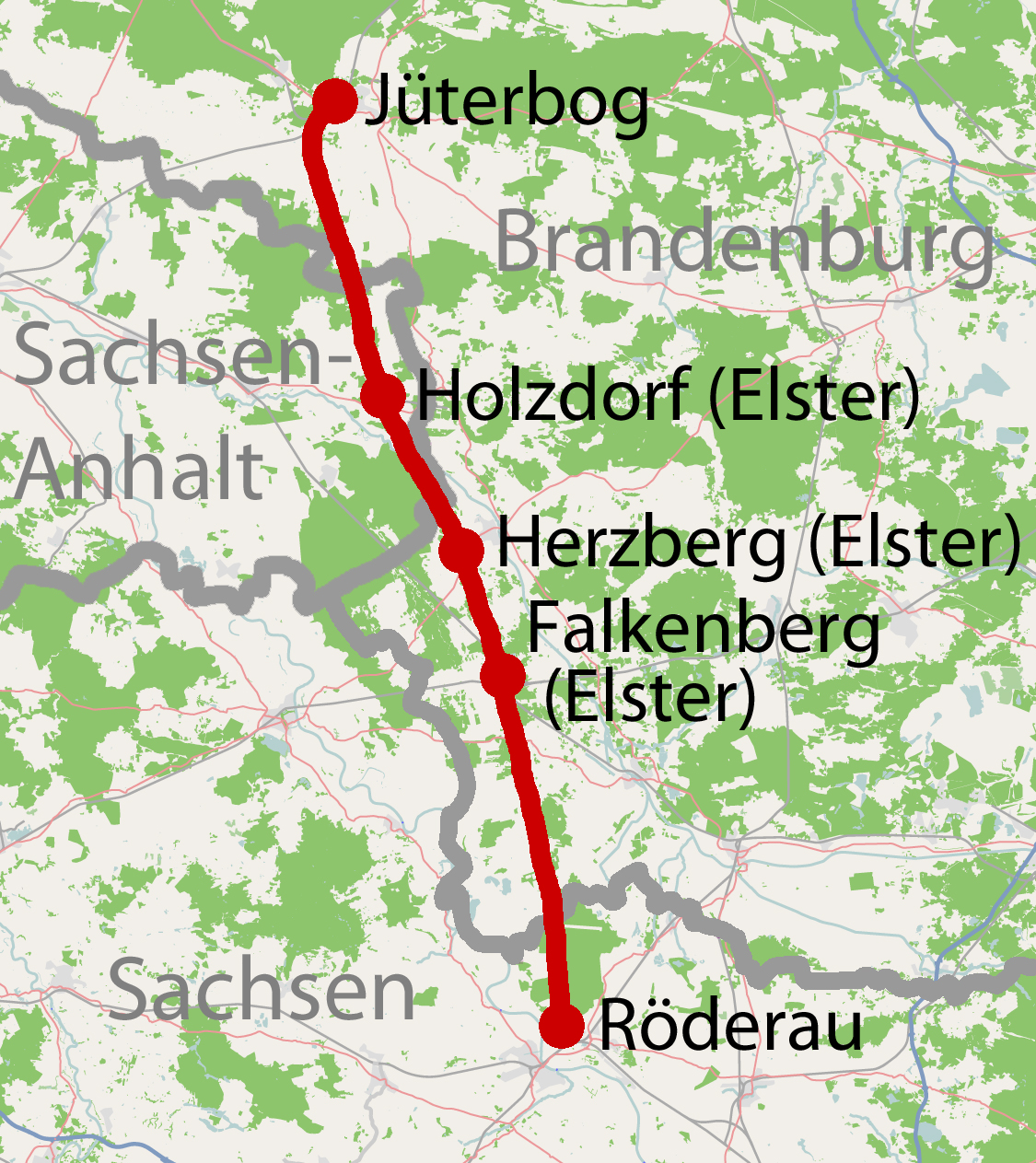

Overview
- Line number: 6133
- Locale: Brandenburg, Saxony-Anhalt and Saxony, Germany

Service
- Route number: 204 Jüterbog–Falkenberg (Elster); 216 Falkenberg (Elster)–Riesa

Technical
- Line length: 80 km (50 mi)
- Track gauge: 1,435 mm (4 ft 8 1/2 in) standard gauge
- Electrification: 15 kV/16.7 Hz AC overhead
- Operating speed: 100 km/h (62 mph) (maximum)

The Jüterbog–Röderau railway is an electrified main line in the German states of Brandenburg, Saxony-Anhalt and Saxony. It runs from Jüterbog via Falkenberg (Elster) to Röderau, near Riesa. There it ends in a triangular junction with the Leipzig–Dresden railway, connecting to Riesa and Dresden. The Jüterbog–Falkenberg section consists of a single track; the Falkenberg–Riesa section has two tracks. It was opened in 1848 and is one of the oldest lines in Germany.

== History ==
=== Planning and Construction ===
The Berlin-Anhalt Railway Company (German: Berlin-Anhaltische Eisenbahn-Gesellschaft, BAE) was one of the major railway companies in Germany for more than four decades during the 19th century. One of its major objects was to connect Berlin and Dresden. The first section of the Anhalt trunk line was opened on 1 July 1841 from Berlin to Jüterbog. After several delays, the Jüterbog–Röderau line opened in two stages in 1848. On 2 July, the line from Jüterbog to Herzberg was opened and on 1 October it was extended to Röderau, where it connected with the Leipzig-Dresden main line.

In 1871, the Halle–Cottbus line of the Halle-Sorau-Guben Railway (Halle-Sorau-Gubener Eisenbahn) was opened over the Jüterbog–Röderau line in Falkenberg. A two-level station was built at the junction.

=== Operations ===
The line was used mainly for transport between Berlin and Dresden. In 1875, the competing direct Berlin–Dresden line of the Berlin-Dresden Railway Company (Berlin-Dresdener Eisenbahn-Gesellschaft) was opened between the two cities. This line, which ran via Elsterwerda, was about twelve kilometres shorter. At the end of the World War II long-distance traffic was shared between both routes. Most trains running via Röderau divided at Falkenberg, with one section continuing to Chemnitz and the other to Dresden.

After the division of Berlin, long distance trains no longer ran to Anhalt station, but instead ran on the Berlin outer ring to eastern Berlin. The Anhalt route involved a greater detour for trains to and from Dresden; as a result all trains between Berlin and Dresden ran via Elsterwerda. Some express trains continued to run via Falkenberg to Chemnitz (renamed Karl-Marx-Stadt in 1953). Express trains were diverted to the Riesa–Elsterwerda line in the early 1970s and the line via Falkenberg was served only by freight and regional passenger services. The only prestige service on the line was an express train on the Dresden–Falkenberg–Dessau route (later running on to Köthen) and return, running on Fridays and Sundays.

After the fall of Communism, services improved on the northern section between Jüterbog and Falkenberg, which connected to Berlin. The trains were given a minimum of investment and connected directly to Berlin. In contrast, traffic on the southern sector to Riesa steadily declined. In December 2004, passenger services on this section were cancelled by the Upper Elbe Transport Association.

== Current situation ==
The Jüterbog–Falkenberg section is now served every two hours by Regional-Express trains as line RE5, connecting to Berlin. There are now no scheduled passenger trains on the southern sector, only freight trains.

== Sources ==
=== References ===
- "Berlin-Anhaltische Eisenbahn" (in German). Axel Mauruszat.
