= Finsterwalde (Niederlausitz) station =

Railway station in Brandenburg, Germany

Finsterwalde (Niederlausitz)
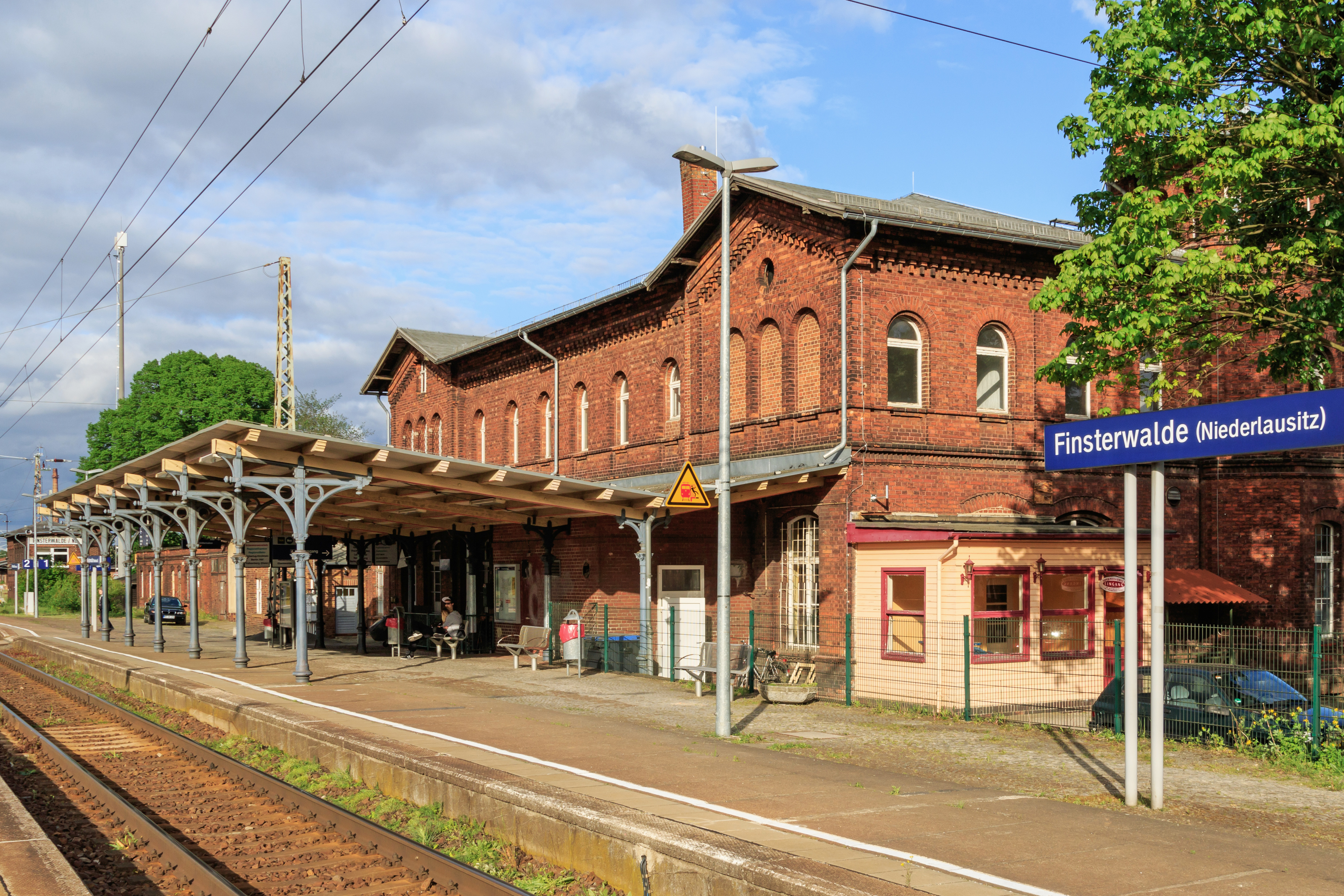
- 2015

General information
- Location: Bahnhofstraße 5; 03238 Finsterwalde; Brandenburg; Germany
- Coordinates: 51°42′17″N 13°53′13″E
- Owner: DB Netz
- Operator: DB Station&Service
- Lines: Halle–Cottbus railway (KBS 215); Finsterwalde–Luckau railway; Schipkau-Finsterwalde railway
- Platforms: 2 side platforms
- Tracks: 2
- Train operators: DB Regio Nordost; Ostdeutsche Eisenbahn

Other information
- Station code: 1795
- DS100 code: BFW
- IBNR: 8011542
- Category: 5
- Fare zone: : 7561
- Website: www.bahnhof.de

History
- Opened: 1 December 1871; 154 years ago

Services
Preceding station	Ostdeutsche Eisenbahn	Following station
Luckau-Uckro towards Berlin Hbf	RE 8	Terminus
Preceding station	DB Regio Nordost	Following station
Doberlug-Kirchhain towards Leipzig Hbf	RE 10	Calau towards Frankfurt (Oder)
Doberlug-Kirchhain towards Herzberg (Elster)	RB 43	Gollmitz towards Frankfurt (Oder)
Location
- Location within Brandenburg

Finsterwalde (Niederlausitz) station is a railway station in the municipality of Finsterwalde, located in the Elbe-Elster district in Brandenburg, Germany.
