= LJN (disambiguation) =

LJN was a toy and video game company located in New York City.

LJN may also refer to:

- Texas Gulf Coast Regional Airport, assigned LJN by the IATA
- Jessen (Elster) station, Saxony-Anhalt, Germany, DS100 code LJN
- Lucknow Junction railway station, Uttar Pradesh, India, Indian Railways station code LJN
