= Beilrode station =

Railway station in Germany

Beilrode
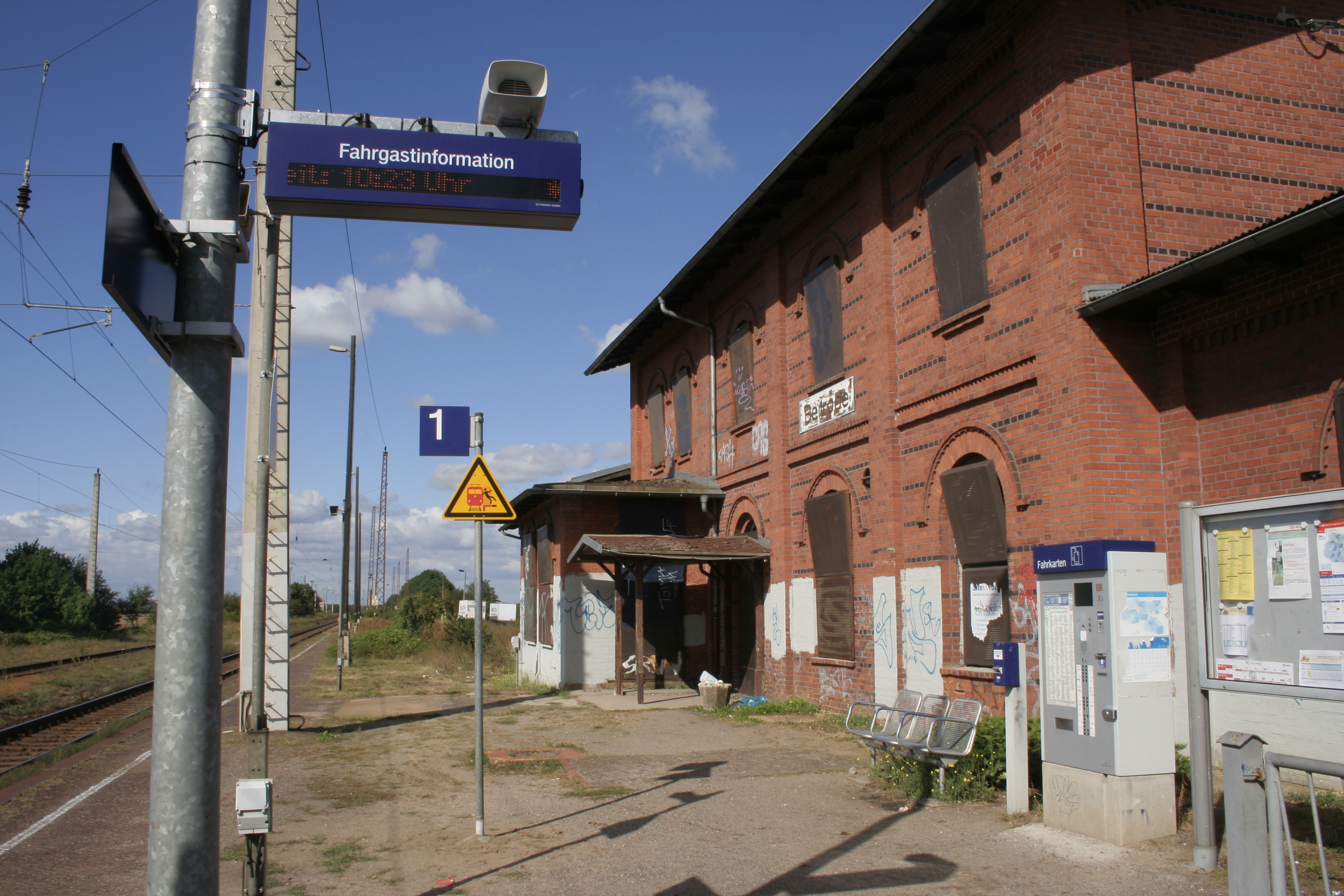
- 2012

General information
- Location: Bahnhofstraße 4; 04886 Beilrode; Saxony; Germany
- Coordinates: 51°34′16″N 13°03′54″E
- Owner: DB Netz
- Operator: DB Station&Service
- Lines: Halle–Cottbus railway (KBS 219)
- Platforms: 2 side platforms
- Tracks: 2
- Train operators: DB Regio Nordost

Other information
- Station code: 467
- DS100 code: LBEI
- IBNR: 8011131
- Category: 6
- Fare zone: MDV: 124
- Website: www.bahnhof.de

Services
Preceding station	DB Regio Nordost	Following station
Torgau towards Leipzig Hbf	RE 10	Falkenberg (Elster) towards Frankfurt (Oder)
Preceding station	Mitteldeutschland S-Bahn	Following station
Rehfeld (Falkenberg) towards Falkenberg (Elster)	S 4	Torgau towards Markkleeberg-Gaschwitz
Location
- Location within Saxony

Beilrode station is a railway station in the municipality of Beilrode, located in the Nordsachsen district in Saxony, Germany.
