= Falkenberg (Elster) station =

Railway station in Germany

Falkenberg (Elster)
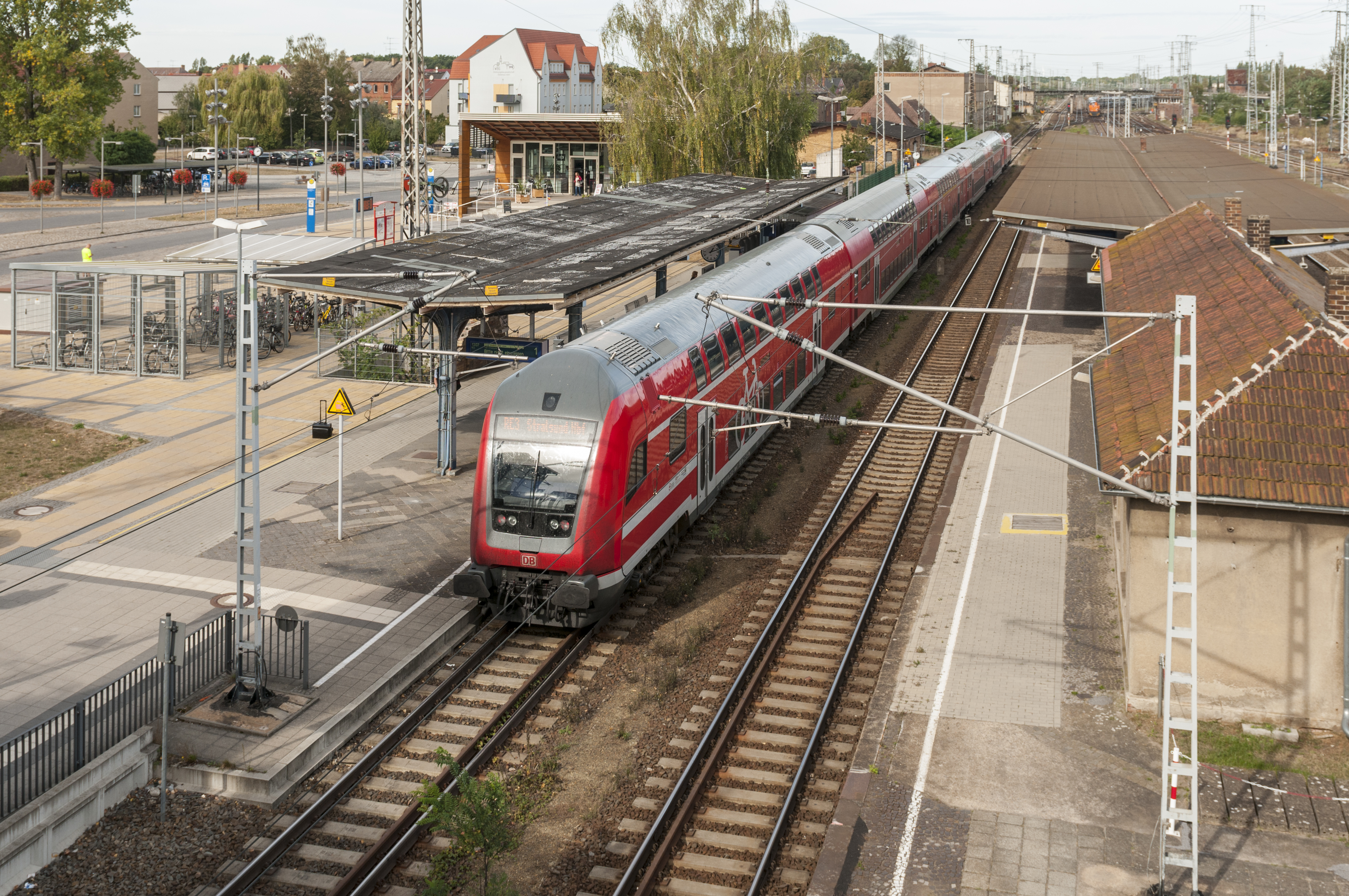
- View from the upper level to the lower level of the station

General information
- Location: Bahnhofstr. 8, Falkenberg/Elster, Brandenburg; Germany
- Coordinates: 51°35′00″N 13°14′51″E
- Owner: Deutsche Bahn
- Operator: DB Station&Service
- Lines: Jüterbog–Röderau; Halle (Saale) Hbf–Guben; Węgliniec–Roßlau; Falkenberg–Beeskow
- Platforms: 6, formerly 8

Construction
- Accessible: Partially

Other information
- Station code: 1752
- DS100 code: LF
- IBNR: 8010103
- Category: 3
- Fare zone: : 7753; MDV: 298 (Note: MDV fares only apply for travel between zones 124, 291, and 292.)
- Website: www.bahnhof.de

History
- Opening: 1871; 155 years ago

Services
Preceding station	DB Regio Nordost	Following station
Herzberg (Elster) towards Schwedt	RE 3 Limited service	Terminus
Herzberg (Elster) towards Rathenow or Stendal Hbf	RE 4	Terminus
Beilrode towards Leipzig Hbf	RE 10	Doberlug-Kirchhain towards Frankfurt (Oder)
Beilrode towards Leipzig Hbf	RE 11	Bad Liebenwerda towards Hoyerswerda
Terminus	RB 43	Uebigau towards Frankfurt (Oder)
Terminus	RB 49	Bad Liebenwerda towards Cottbus Hbf
Preceding station	DB Regio Südost	Following station
Fermerswalde towards Dessau Hbf	RE 14 Limited service	Terminus
Fermerswalde towards Dessau Hbf	RB 51	Terminus
Preceding station	Mitteldeutschland S-Bahn	Following station
Rehfeld towards Markkleeberg-Gaschwitz	S 4	Terminus
Location

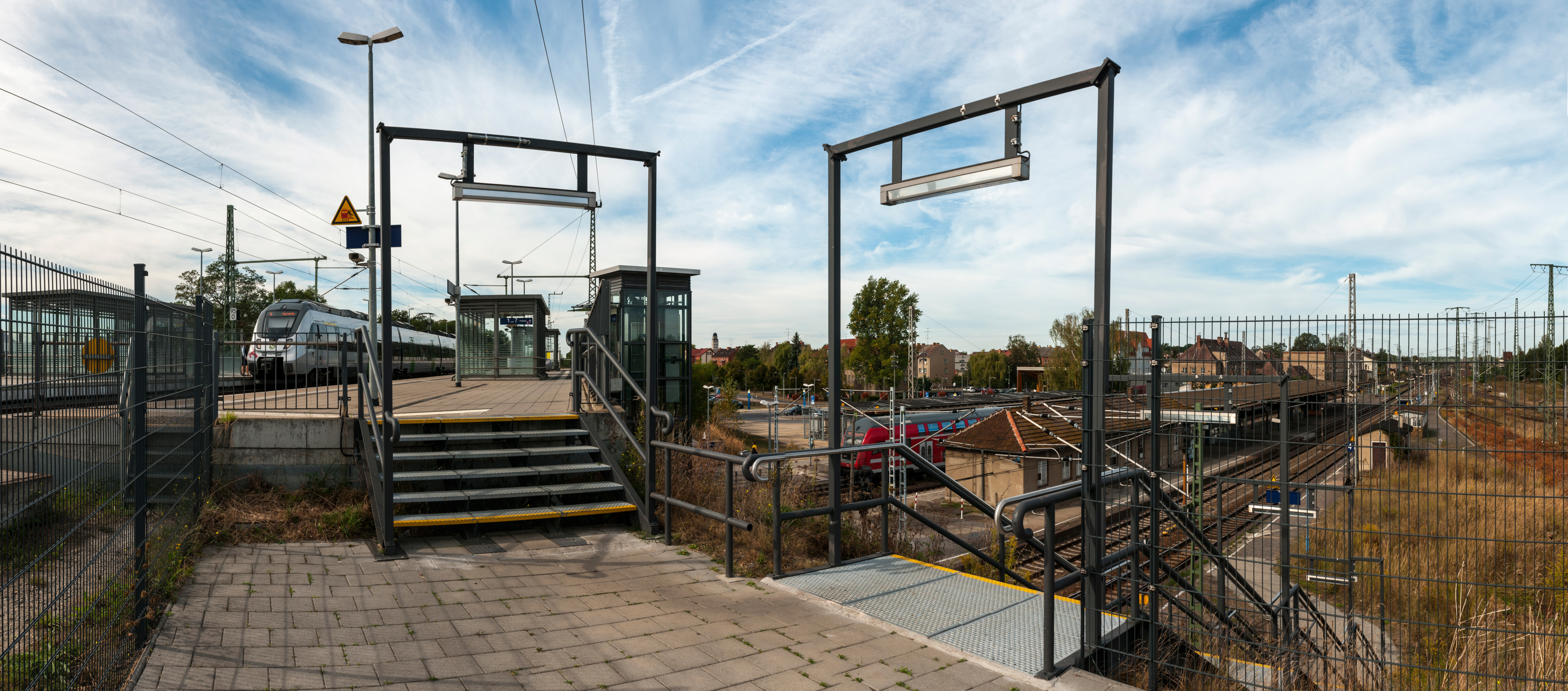
total view

Falkenberg (Elster) station is one of the biggest stations in the German state of Brandenburg. It is located in the town of Falkenberg/Elster in the south of the state. It is classified by Deutsche Bahn as a category 3 station. Railways run in seven directions from the station. It is a two-level interchange station (German: Turmbahnhof, literally a “tower station”), built where several routes interconnect. There is a large marshalling yard connecting to both the upper and the lower parts of the station. At times Falkenberg was the fifth largest marshalling yard in East Germany (GDR). Only part of these tracks have been in use since the 1990s.

A large station building, which had been built in 1882, was destroyed in the Second World War. A restaurant complex built in GDR times was substantially rebuilt after 2010 and now serves as the entrance building. A number of buildings of the station and its surrounds are heritage-listed.

== Location and name ==
The station is situated mostly in the town of Falkenberg/Elster in the Elbe-Elster district not far from the state borders of Saxony and Saxony-Anhalt. Originally the station was called Falkenberg (b. Torgau), but it received its present name in 1937. While the town is written Falkenberg/Elster (with a slash), the station is written with parentheses.

The station building is located at km 111.9 of the Jüterbog–Röderau railway, which runs north–south, at kilometer 148.2 of the Węgliniec–Roßlau railway, which runs from southeast to northwest, and at kilometer 95.0 of the Halle–Cottbus railway, which runs west–east. The latter line runs through the upper level of Falkenberg station, while the others run through the lower level. The Lower Lusatian Railway (Niederlausitzer Eisenbahn), which runs to the northeast, also begins at the lower station.

The station has extensive marshalling yards, both connected to the lower and the upper stations and extending over several kilometres. The eastern part of the upper station extends to the territory of the town of Uebigau-Wahrenbrück.

The centre of the town of Falkenberg is located west of the line from Berlin and north of the line from Halle. The original village centre and its manor was about 400 metres from the station.

== History ==
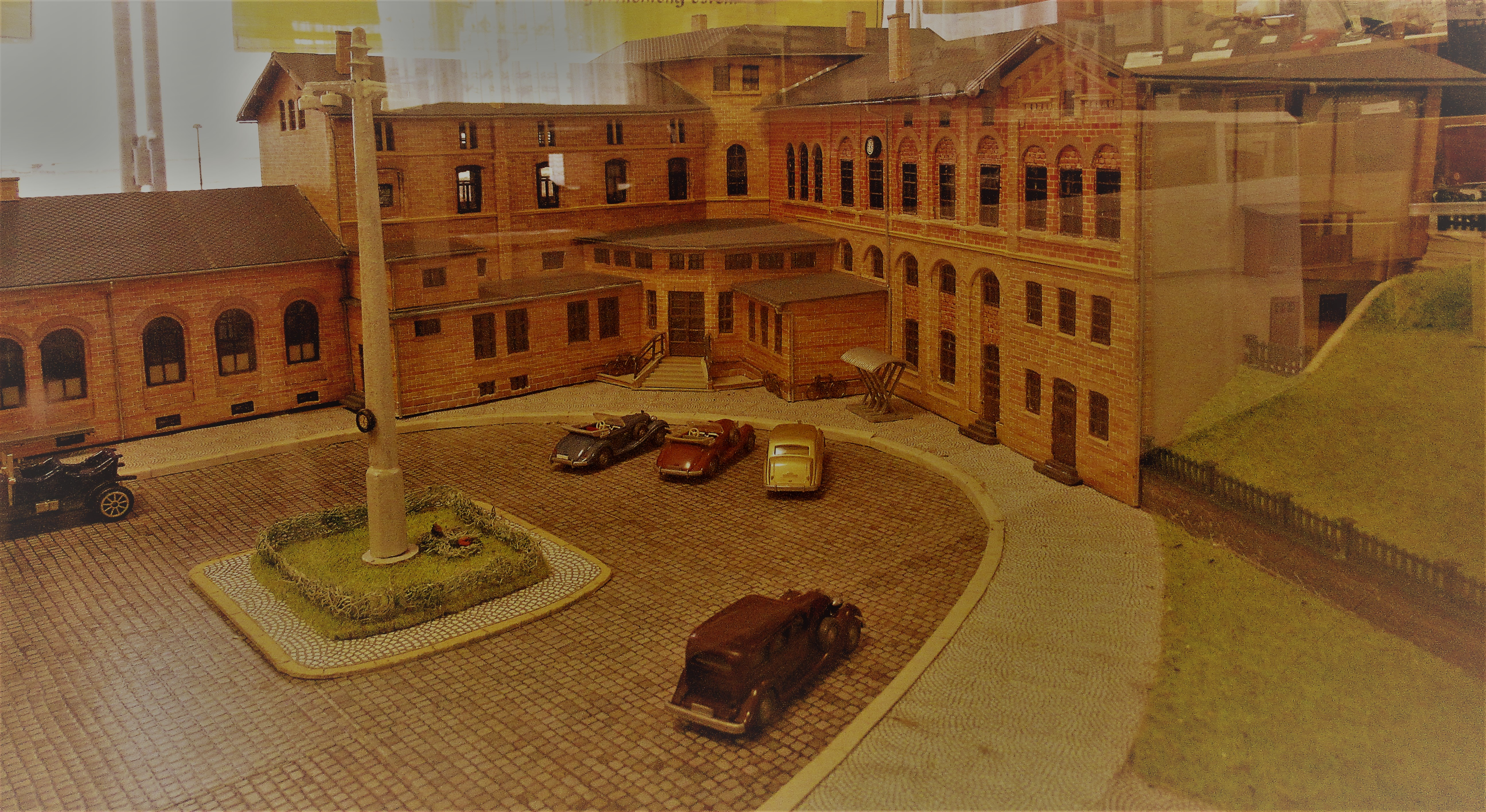
Model of the former entrance building (destroyed in April 1945)

The Berlin-Anhalt Railway Company (German: Berlin-Anhaltische Eisenbahn-Gesellschaft, BAE) opened its line from Berlin to Köthen (then spelt Cöthen) in 1841. It planned from the beginning, an additional line that would connect Berlin with Leipzig and Dresden. The towns of Herzberg, Uebigau and Liebenswerda were stubbornly opposed to the railway having direct contact with their towns. So a slightly more westerly route was chosen that passed near the small village and manor of Falkenberg. The station was initially a small halt with a station master, a telegrapher, two signalmen and some shunters.

A railway from Falkenberg to Cottbus was opened by the Halle-Sorau-Guben Railway (Halle-Sorau-Gubener Eisenbahn, HSGE) on 1 December 1871. At first the trains stopped in the lower part of the old station. A line running to the west from Falkenberg via Eilenburg to Halle was opened on 1 May 1872. In the same year the Upper Lusatian Railway Company (Oberlausitzer Eisenbahn-Gesellschaft) began construction of its line from Kohlfurt (now Węgliniec) to Falkenberg, which was opened on 1 June 1874. This was followed by the BAE's extension of its line from Wittenberg on 15 October 1875, creating connections to lines to Halle and Dessau. The BAE took over the management on the lines of the Upper Lusatian Railway Company in 1878. The traffic on all three lines became very active in the following years, so that Falkenberg became an important railway junction. In 1882 a new, larger station building was built at the intersection of the upper and lower lines. In the same year the Prussian government took over the management of the lines of the BAE and two years later it took over the HSGE. Nevertheless, the names of the Halle-Sorauer Bahnhof (Halle-Sorau station) for the upper level and the Berlin-Anhalter Bahnhof (Berlin-Anhalt station) for the lower level persisted.

The then competent Staatsbahndirektion (railway division) of Erfurt combined the two workshops of the BAE and HSGE, and from 1887 they were referred to as an operating workshop (Betriebswerkstätte), which later developed into a locomotive depot (Bahnbetriebswerk).

=== Expansion after 1890 ===
Traffic increased significantly to Falkenberg at the end of the 19th century. The three main railway lines were doubled from 1896 to 1912 to overcome their capacity constraints. The station facilities with the marshalling yards and workshops were extended. A new water tower was built in 1895 and another engine shed was put in operation at the lower station in 1908. The last of the railways built to Falkenberg was opened on 15 March 1898, the private Lower Lusatian Railway to Uckro.

In a train accident in the summer of 1934, a freight train in the lower part on station ran into another and the vehicles pushed off the track collided with an oncoming train. One man was killed.

The Wehrmacht opened a large army airfield at Alt-Lönnewitz southwest of Falkenberg in 1936. A connecting railway ran to it from the top station, which carried materials and airfield employees.

The station had 20 km of mainline track and 93 km of sidings with 324 points in 1939. It had 20 signal boxes and three engine sheds on the upper and lower part of the station. The exits from the marshalling yard handled 4,000 freight wagons a day from the top part and 2,400 from the lower part of the station. There was a siding to the airport with branches to a substation and to the Falkenberg branch of the Torgau grain cooperative.

In World War II, construction began on a multi-track upgrade of the line toward Jüterbog, which was not completed. Some embankments have been preserved. The work was carried out largely by the use of forced labourers and prisoners of war.

Because of the strategic importance of the station, with its marshalling yards and the nearby Falkenberg airfield, it was a target for several Allied bombing raids in the Second World War. The most serious of these attacks occurred in April 1945. On 18 April, the entrance building, the crossing structure and a number of buildings in the area were completely destroyed. After radio reports had already announced that there would be further attacks on the day with the goal of total destruction of the Falkenberg railway junction, bomb raids were primarily carried out on the lower station and a number of buildings were destroyed, including the locomotive depot.

=== After the Second World War ===
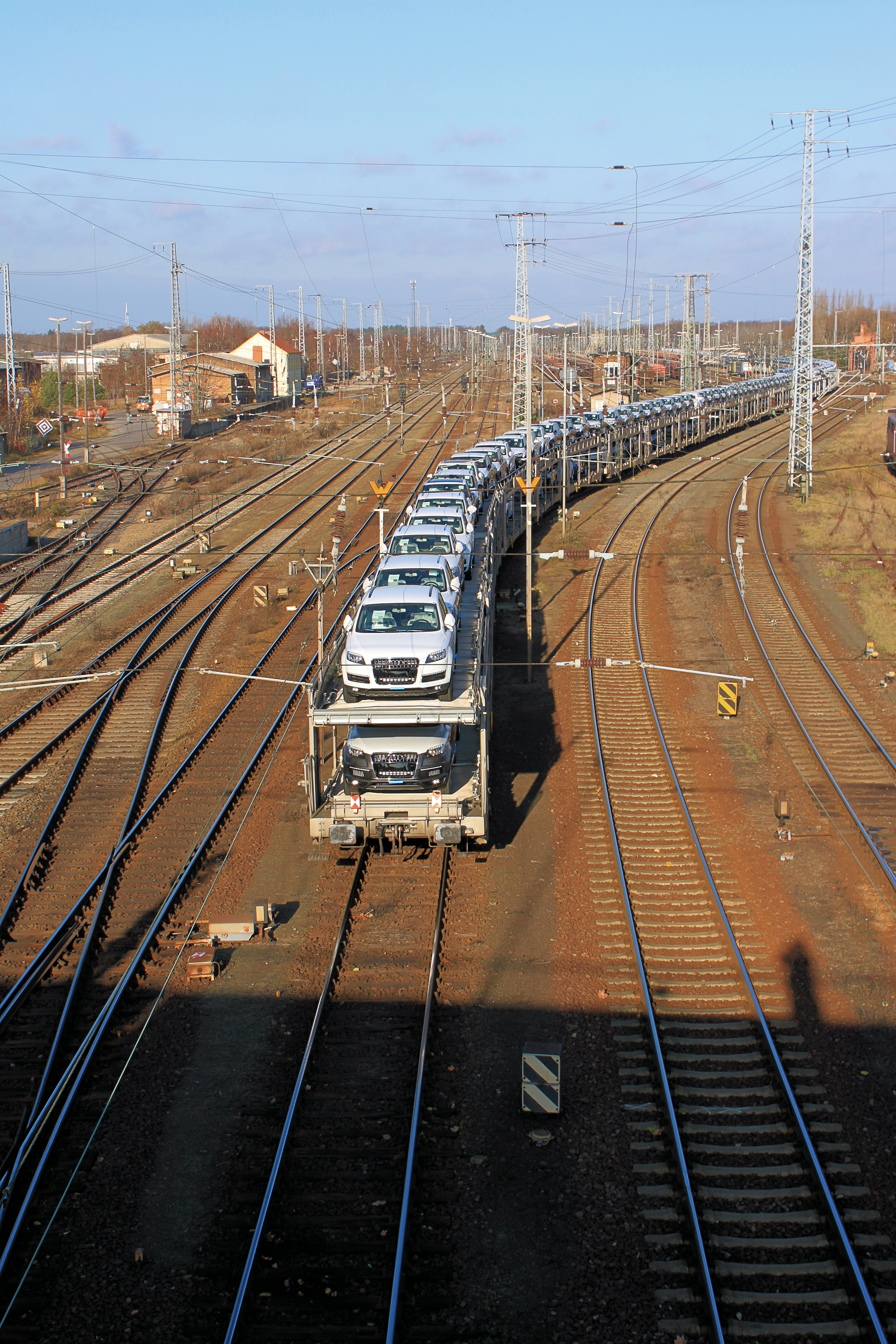
Lower marshalling yard

A few days after the war, Soviet troops under station commander Braschenko began rebuilding the strategic rail facilities on 15 May 1945. In the following months, the railway lines out of Falkenberg were gradually returned to operation, at first provisionally. All tracks were usable again in 1948.

In GDR times, the station was expanded and included 160 km of railway tracks and 377 sets of points. In addition to the north-eastern connecting curve from the lower to the upper station, which had existing since the 19th century, a connecting curve was built south-east of the crossing, allowing direct trips from the west to the lower station, allowing operations to Elsterwerda without having to reverse in the upper yard. The locomotive depot became one of the largest in East Germany with about 500 employees. About 5,000 freight wagons left Falkenberg each day in the 1970s and 1980s.

The station was also important for national defence. Freight tracks were temporarily provided with platforms for travelling Soviet soldiers so that they could use the washing facilities. A new restaurant building was opened for Mitropa in 1972.

The first electrically powered passenger train reached Falkenberg from the direction of Wittenberg on 27 September 1986 and the electrification went into operation towards Riesa on 13 December 1986. Electrification was extended towards Ruhland in October 1987. The other three main railway branches towards Jüterbog, Torgau and Finsterwalde were electrified in 1989.

The importance of the station for freight fell substantially after 1990 due to the decline in industrial production in the region and the modal shift to road transport. The fleet in the depot was increasingly reduced after 1991 and the Wittenberg depot was closed in 1994. In 1998, the depot's work was transferred to the Leipzig-Engelsdorf depot and a little later the station was converted into a purely passenger operation without responsibility for any rollingstock.

In 2010 and 2011, the passenger platforms were built in the upper part of the station and the railway facilities were transformed. The former Mitropa building was completely rebuilt. The upper railway yard was taken over in 2011 by BLG AutoRail, which uses it as a "hub for car transportation by rail".

=== Environment ===
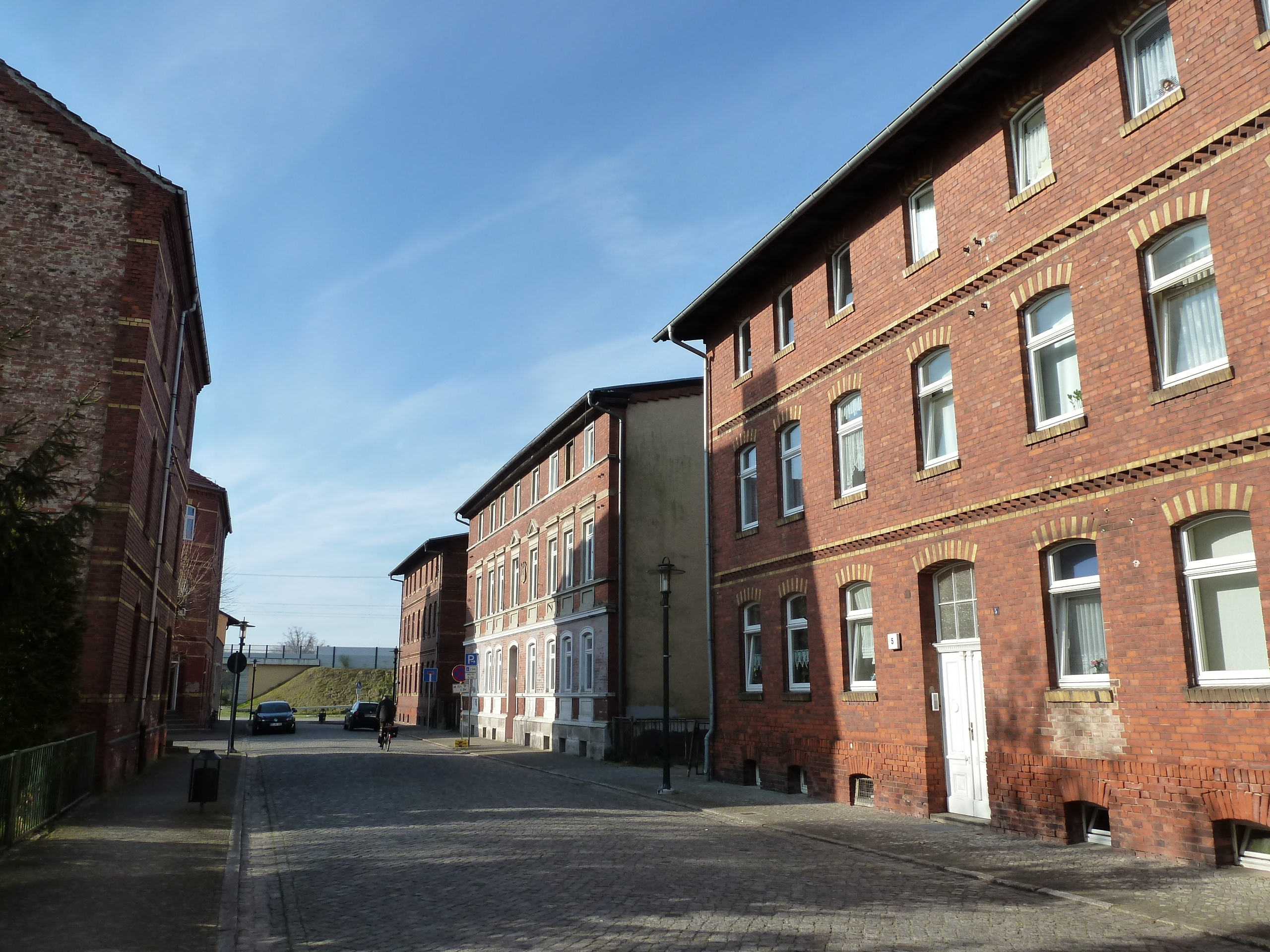
A railway settlement, which was built west of the station around 1900, is now heritage-listed.

The town of Falkenberg has been decisively shaped by the railways. In the first years, the station of Falkenberg was only a minor station as the town had developed very little at this time. Immediately prior to the construction of the railway, Falkenberg had 350 inhabitants, while it had 405 at the time of the opening of the east–west line. With the construction of the east–west line and the later line from Wittenberg to Kohlfurt Falkenberg, it became a railway junction and the village grew considerably. A number of railway workers settled in the city. The area between the railway station and the old town centre was gradually built up. The post office was opened next to the entrance building in 1888.

At the end of the 19th century, the expanding railway tracks were more and more of a hindrance to road traffic. An overpass was built over the tracks in 1896 to replace the level crossing at Uebigauer Straße north of the platforms of the lower station.

From 1897, a cooperative built, with the help of a loan, tenement-like houses in several streets west of the station; these included stables, a little garden land and community laundry rooms. This area is now a heritage-listed area as the Eisenbahnersiedlung Falkenberg (Falkenberg railway settlement). In 1912, the manor came into the possession of the municipality, allowing new construction areas to be identified, mainly east of the railway. In the 1920s, more apartments were built and by 1925 Falkenberg had become the largest town in the former district of Liebenswerda with 4,850 inhabitants.

In 1962, the town, then having about 7,000 inhabitants, received a charter declaring it a town. The town's coat of arms includes a winged wheel as a symbol of the railway.

== Description ==
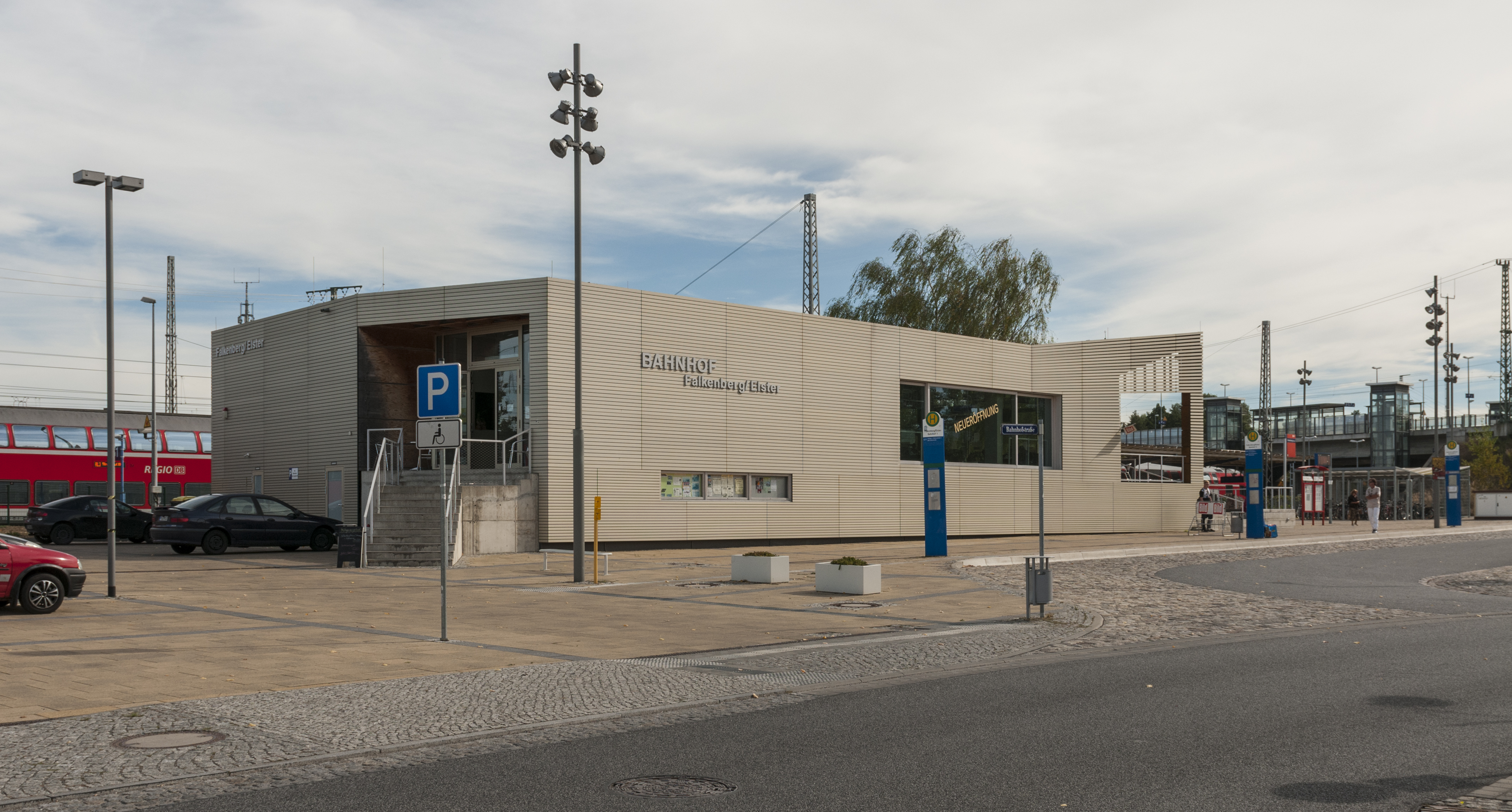
New entrance building

Shortly after the completion of the line, a small entrance building was built in Falkenberg on the west side of the tracks of the Anhalt Railway. After the completion of the other two main lines, a large entrance building was built in the angle between the east–west and north–south lines. The building was destroyed during the Second World War. Thereafter, the original station building was again used as the entrance building. In 1985, the building was substantially rebuilt with significant changes to its outer shape. It later served to house station services. This building was empty when it was sold at auction in December 2013.

In the 1970s, a new building was built south of the entrance building as a Mitropa restaurant. After 1990, the restaurant building was closed temporarily and then used from 2000 as a kiosk before being completely reconstructed in 2010. The restored building was inaugurated in 2011 and now includes a restaurant and the office of the local bus operator, Lehmann-Reisen. There is also a sales point for integrated tickets and Deutsche Bahn tickets. Before the reconstruction, a small building used for the sale of tickets had been located north of it on a platform.

=== Platforms ===
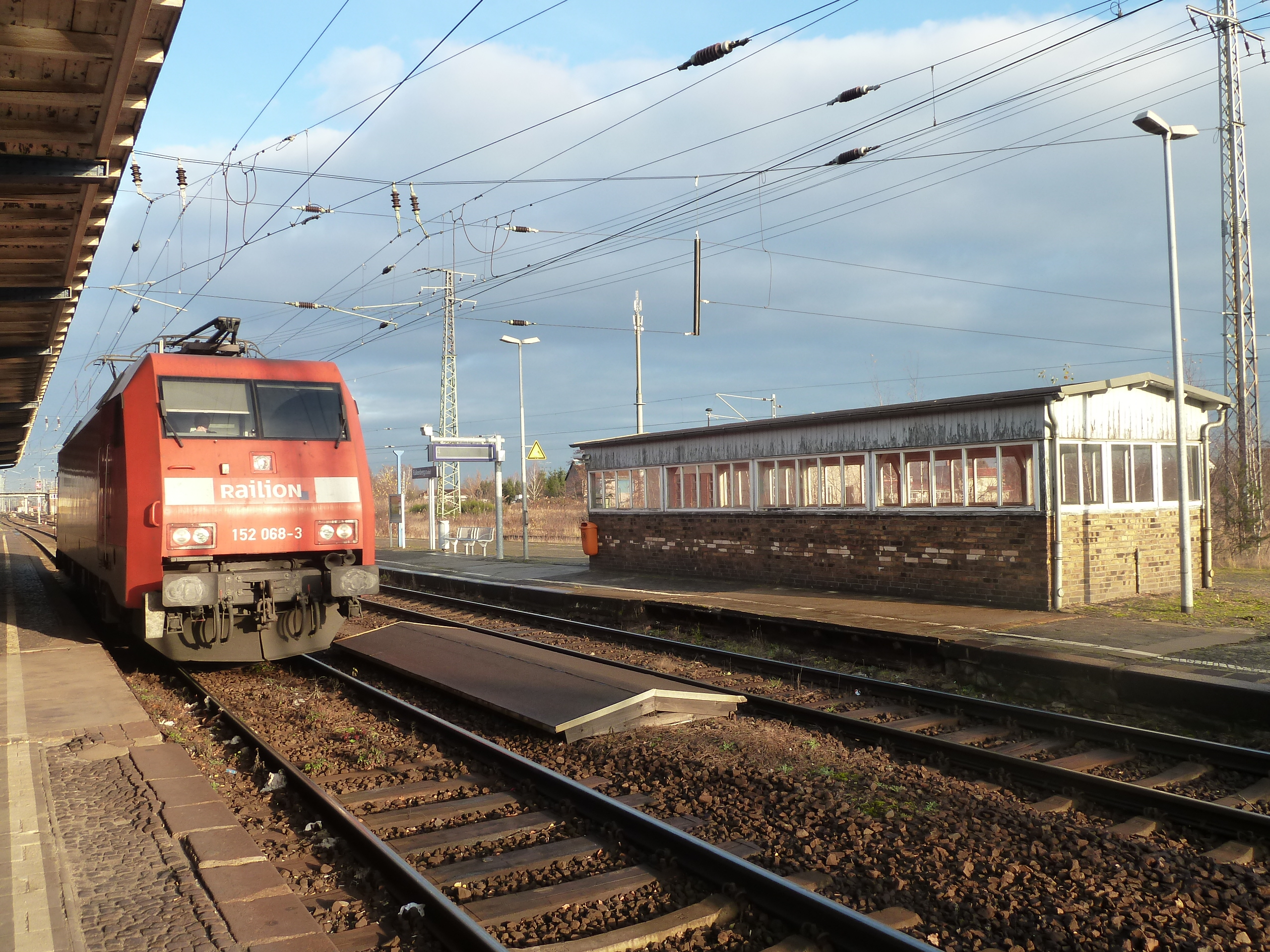
Platforms 3, 4 and 5 with heritage-listed staircase enclosure

The lower level station has five station platform tracks with track 1 next to the station building and the others on two island platforms (track 2 and 3 on one and 4 and 5 on another). The eastern track 5, which was previously mainly used by the trains of the Lower Lusatian Railway, is no longer used. At the southern end of the platforms stairs lead to the upper platforms. The lower platforms were previously connected via a pedestrian tunnel. In the summer of 2012, the tunnel was closed and filled so that travellers now have to take the path on the upper platforms to cross between the various lower platforms.

In the upper part there are two outside station platforms, numbered 6 and 7. Until the reconstruction of the upper platforms carried out from 2000, there were three platform tracks; platform 6 was about at its current location, while tracks 7 and 8 were next to an island platform.

=== Track network ===
Three electrified main lines cross in the area of the railway station: Jüterbog–Röderau and (Węgliniec–) Horka border–Roßlau (both through the lower station) and Halle–Cottbus–Guben (upper station). The Lower Lusatian Railway Railway, a branch line to the northeast, which is no longer operated regularly, begins in the station.

Several connecting curves in the northeastern and southeastern parts of the station enable trains to run between the two levels. The line from Röderau is not directly linked to the upper tracks.

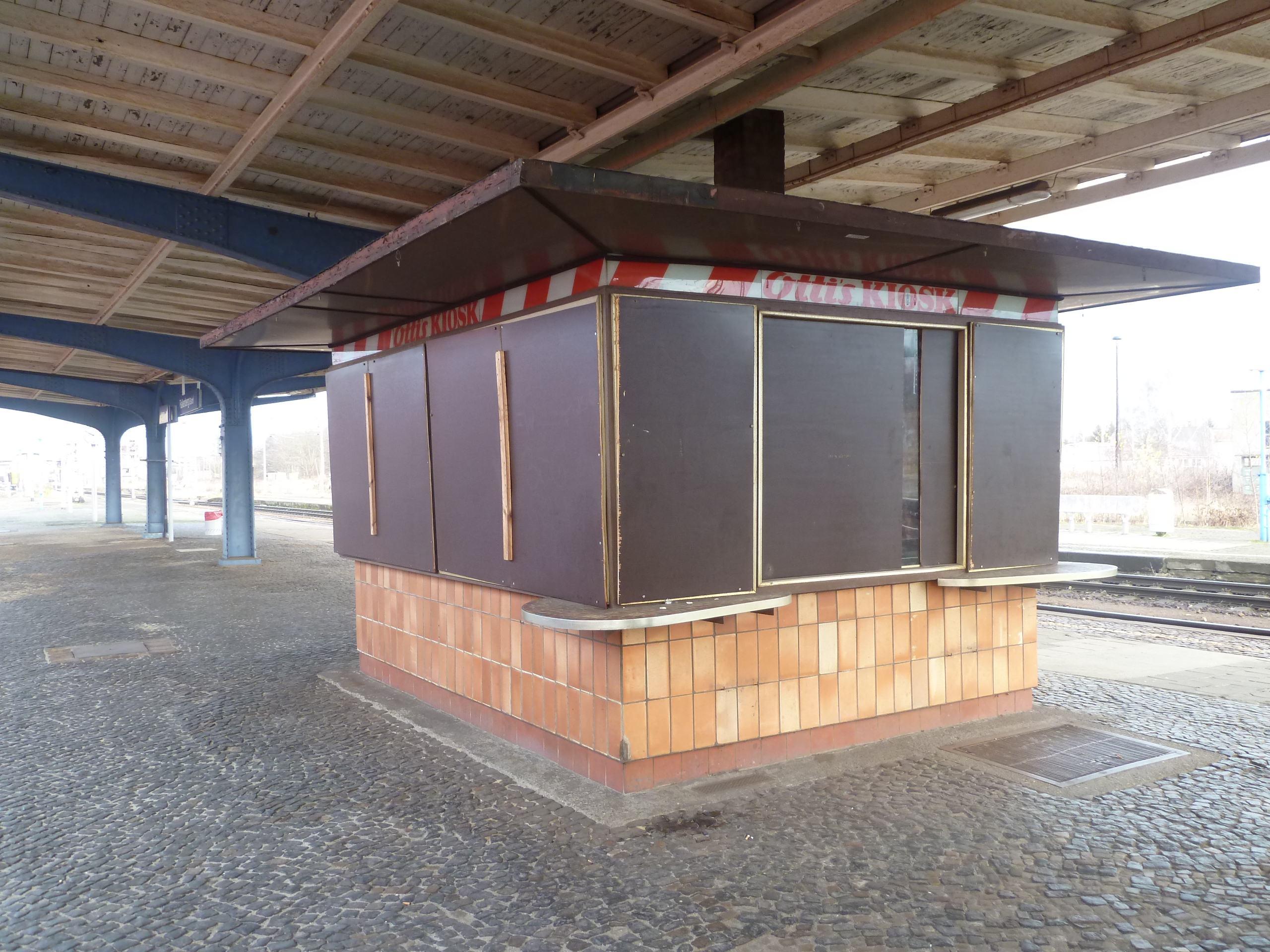
Kiosk and platform canopy of platform 2/3 are heritage-listed

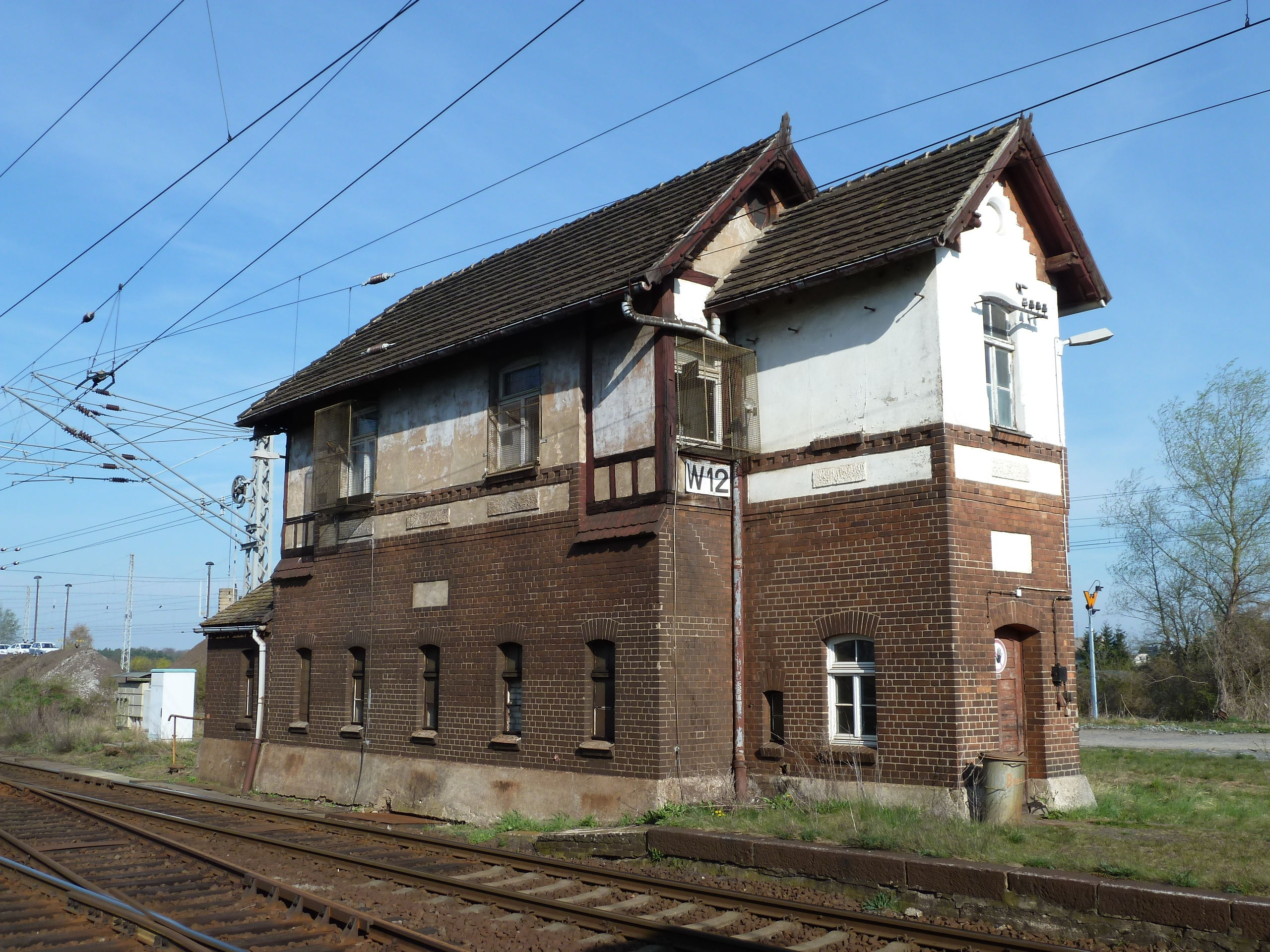
Heritage-listed signal box W12 in eastern part of Uebigau station in the town of Uebigau-Wahrenbrück

The line from Wittenberg crossed the line from Jüterbog about two kilometres north of the passenger station. The lower marshalling yard is between the two lines. The upper marshalling yard is located east of the passenger station on the line towards Cottbus. The lower yard is designed with one entrance/exit, while the upper yard has two ends.

=== Heritage ===
A number of buildings of the station are listed as Turmbahnhof Falkenberg ("tower station Falkenberg") in the list of heritage buildings of the municipality of Falkenberg/Elster.

At the lower station the following objects are heritage-listed: "the water station building, signal box ‘B 20’ including its technology, the platform canopy on platforms 1 and 3/2, the roofing of the staircases and exits from platform 1 and 4/5, the barriers of the staircases and exits from platforms 2/3, the kiosk on platforms 3/2 and level crossing barrier post 4a.”

The listed kiosk was acquired in 1989 by a private owner. Later, the owner took part of the former Mitropa building as a kiosk. With the beginning of the reconstruction work, the snack bar closed on 31 August 2010 after the owner could not agree on its future use with the town.

The stairways from the platforms to the pedestrian tunnels have become unusable since the closure of the platform tunnels. Hopes that the town of Falkenberg would be able to preserve the tunnel were not fulfilled because the heritage listing includes only the platform equipment. The level crossing barrier post 4a on Uebigauer Straße north of the platforms had already lost its original function at the end of the 19th century with the construction of the overpass.

At the upper station the following objects are heritage-listed: "the water tower and water crane, signal box ‘B 3' including its technology and the transformer tower opposite ". These objects are located in the marshalling yard, about 1½ km east of the passenger station. The engine shed III of the upper rail depot has been used by a private collection of locomotives since 2001.

Some other buildings in the station area are also protected as monuments. This includes the heritage-listed "railway settlement” (Eisenbahnersiedlung) in Falkenberg, the former Bahnmeisterei (track master's building, now a house) north of the entrance building, as well as a "class 52 steam locomotive and two water cranes on the north side of the railway premises". The Falkenberg/Elster Railway Museum is also in this area.

The former signal box W 12 at Übigau station is on the list of historic monuments of the town of Uebigau-Wahrenbrück. It is located directly next to the platforms of Uebigau station, the entrance building of which is also a listed building.

== Passenger services ==
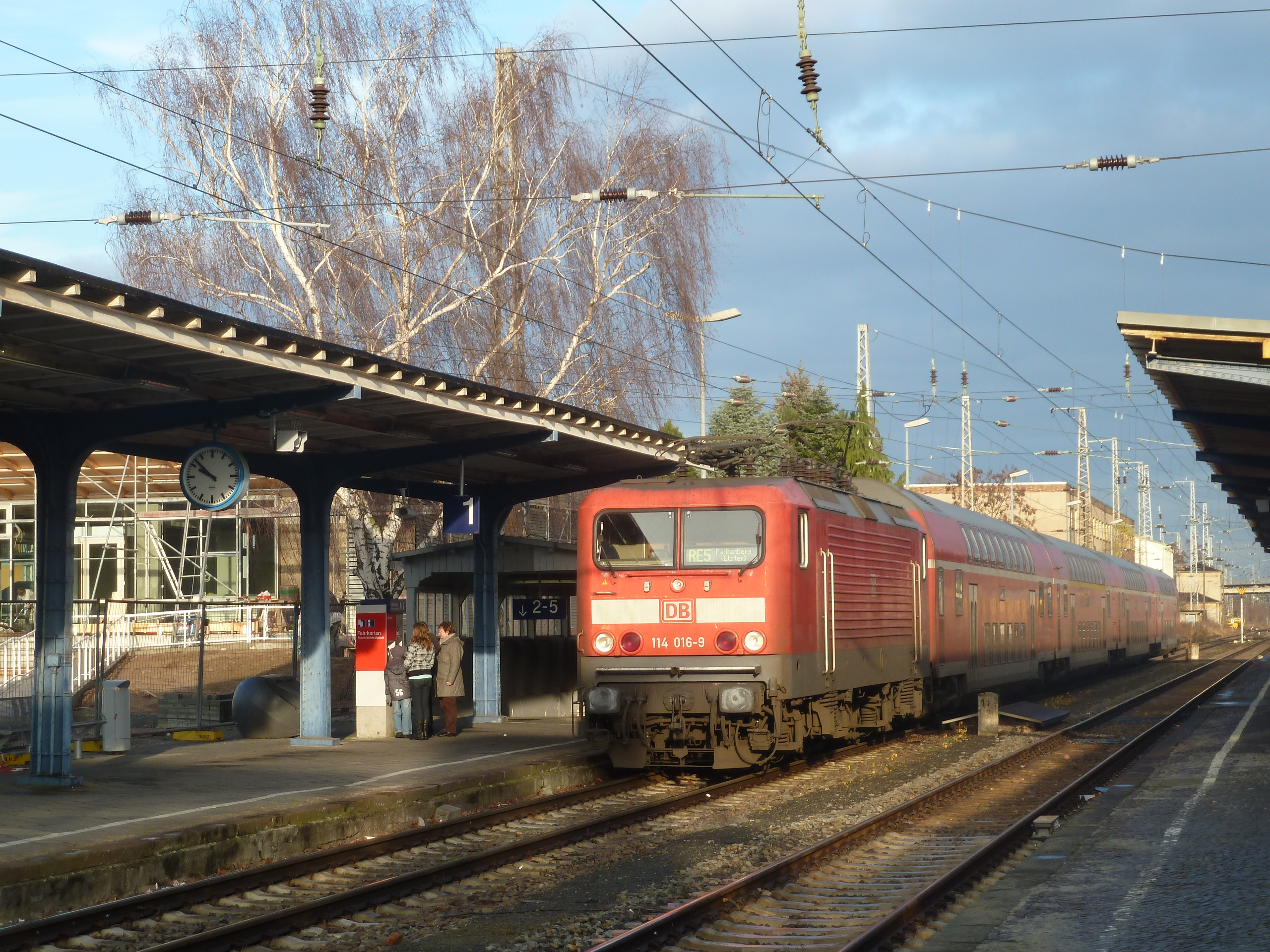
Incoming Regional-Express from Berlin

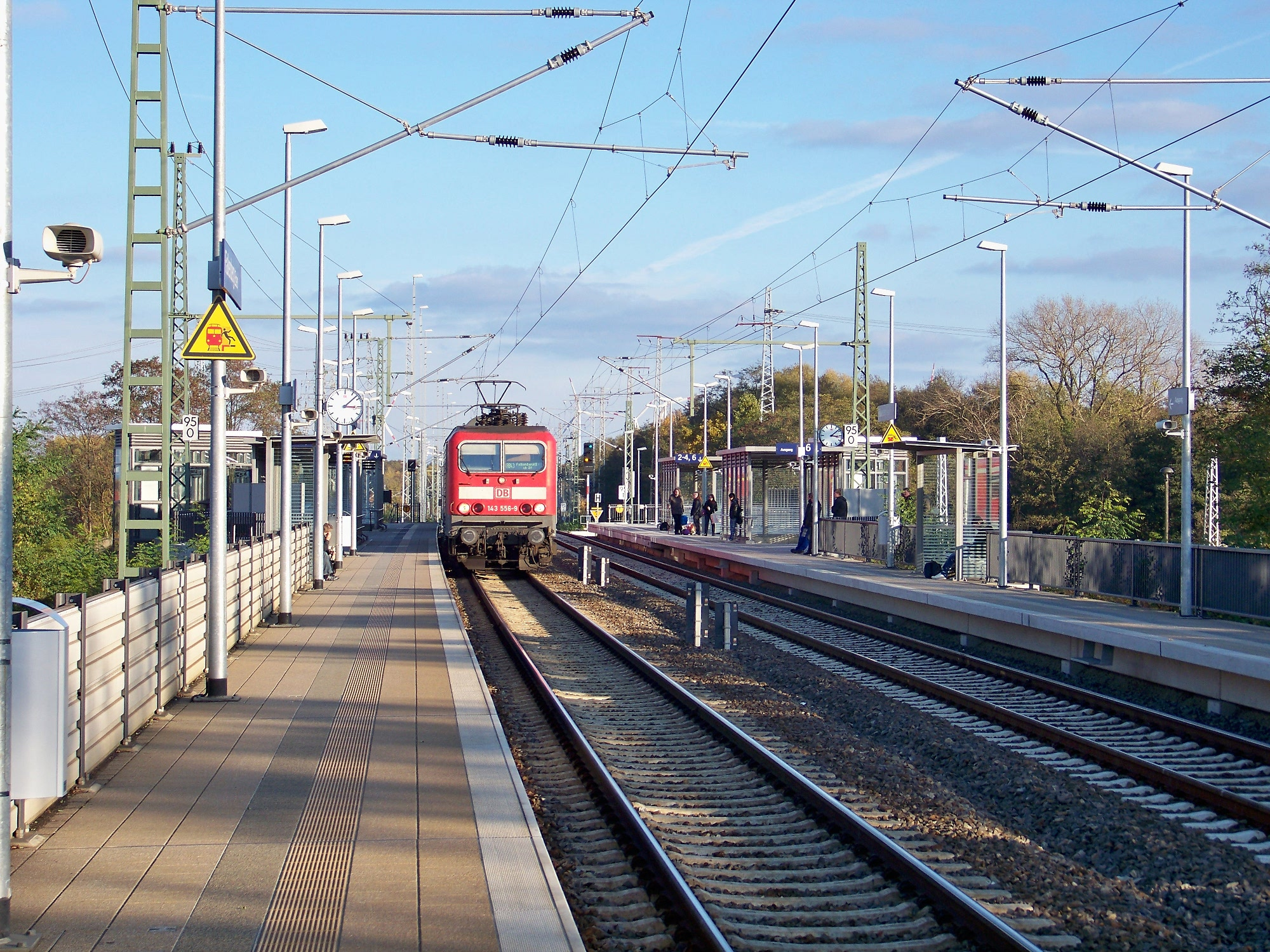
RE to Leipzig at the upper platforms, newly built in 2010/11

Falkenberg was a stop for long-distance traffic for a long time from the time it became a railway junction. In the north–south direction, the Berlin–Dresden railway, after its completion in 1875, competed with the Anhalt line via Falkenberg for traffic from Berlin towards Dresden and Chemnitz. This competition continued until the late 1960s despite the nationalisation of both companies. Often the trains ran on the Anhalt line to Röderau station near Riesa, where it divided with one part of the train continuing to Chemnitz and the other to Dresden, where part of it continued to Prague. Almost all of these trains stopped in Falkenberg.

In 1930, 211,000 passengers were counted departing from Falkenberg. At that time, eight express, six semi-fast and 42 stopping trains ran daily in different directions.

Since the late 1960s, scheduled traffic from Berlin towards Dresden and Riesa has almost exclusively been carried on the Berlin–Dresden railway. But even after 2000, diverted trains often ran between Berlin and Dresden via Falkenberg, but without stopping at the station.

In the east–west direction, some express and semi-fast passenger trains ran in the 1930s via Falkenberg, such as a pair of express trains between Kassel and Breslau (now Wrocław in Poland). Until the 1990s, a series of express trains ran in the east–west direction via Falkenberg, including an inter-zone train between Frankfurt (Oder) and Frankfurt (Main). In the first half of the 1990s, the rail services were harmonised in an integrated regular-interval timetable. In the 1995–96 timetable the following services operated from Falkenberg (Elster), each every two hours:

- InterRegio: Leipzig–Falkenberg–Doberlug-Kirchhain–Cottbus (portions from Leipzig coming originally from other stations)
- Regional-Express: Schwedt–Berlin–Falkenberg–Ruhland–Cottbus
- Regionalbahn: Leipzig–Falkenberg (with extra trains in the peak)
- Regionalbahn: Falkenberg–Riesa (gap in the regular interval pattern in the morning)
- Regionalbahn: Falkenberg–Herzberg Stadt
- Regionalbahn: Falkenberg–Ruhland
- Regionalbahn: Falkenberg–Doberlug-Kirchhain–Cottbus
- Regionalbahn: Lutherstadt Wittenberg–Falkenberg (with extra trains in the peak)

There were three Regional-Express trains a day from Wittenberg (with part of the train originating in Aschersleben) to Görlitz.

The regional services beyond Herzberg Stadt (town) were discontinued as early as 1995. In April 1998, passenger services also ended between Falkenberg and Herzberg Stadt. In May 2001, the Deutsche Bahn InterRegio service between Leipzig, Falkenberg and Cottbus was replaced by a Regional-Express service. Passenger services between Falkenberg and Riesa ended at the timetable change in December 2004. Over the years there have been several more service changes, including the introduction of a Regional-Express service from Leipzig via Falkenberg to Ruhland and Hoyerswerda. This service was introduced in December 2013 as the S 4 service of the S-Bahn Mitteldeutschland.

The station was served by the following services in 2026:

Line	Route	Frequency
RE 3	Falkenberg – Jüterbog – Ludwigsfelde – Berlin Südkreuz – Berlin Hbf – Eberswalde – Angermünde – Schwedt(Oder)	One train Sa+Su night
RE 4	Falkenberg – Jüterbog – Ludwigsfelde – Berlin Südkreuz – Berlin Hbf – Berlin-Staaken – Elstal – Rathenow (– Stendal)	Every 2 hours
RE 10	Leipzig Hbf – Falkenberg – Doberlug-Kirchhain – Cottbus – Jänschwalde – Guben – Eisenhüttenstadt – Finkenheerd – Frankfurt(Oder)	Every 2 hours
RE 11	Leipzig Hbf – Falkenberg – Elsterwerda-Biehla – Ruhland – Hoyerswerda	Every 2 hours
RE 14	Falkenberg – Jessen – Lutherstadt Wittenberg Hbf – Dessau	Some trains
RB 43	Falkenberg – Doberlug-Kirchhain – Cottbus – Jänschwalde – Guben – Eisenhüttenstadt – Finkenheerd – Frankfurt(Oder)	Every 2 hours
RB 49	Falkenberg – Elsterwerda-Biehla – Ruhland – Senftenberg (– Cottbus)	Every 2 hours
RB 51	Falkenberg – Jessen – Lutherstadt Wittenberg Hbf – Dessau	Every 2 hours
S 4	Falkenberg – Eilenburg – Leipzig Hbf – Leipzig Bayerischer Bahnhof – Markkleeberg – Markkleeberg-Gaschwitz	Every 2 hours
