= Fermerswalde station =

Railway station in Herzberg (Elster), Germany

Fermerswalde
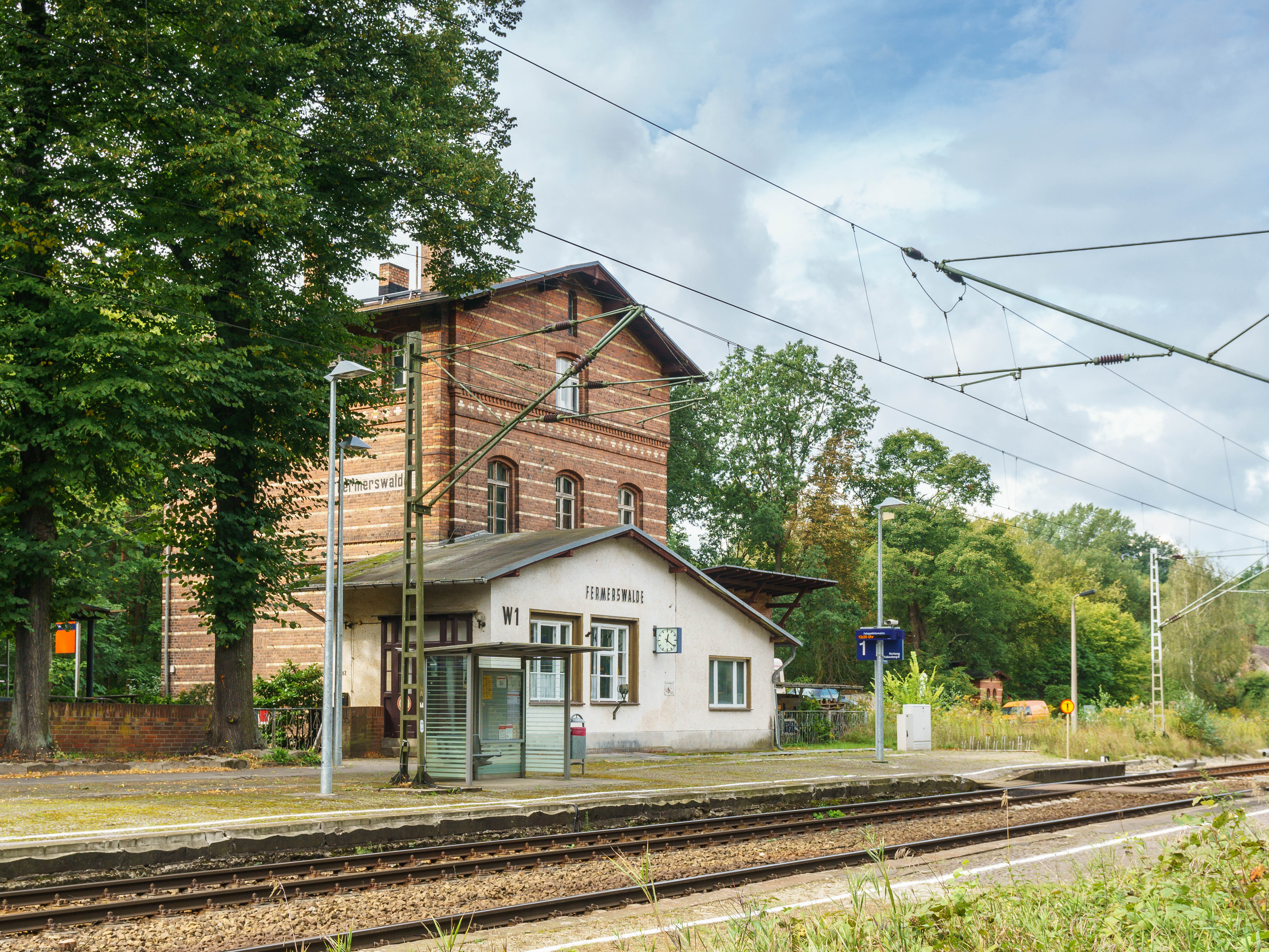
- 2017

General information
- Location: Am Fermerswalder Bahnhof 12; 04916 Fermerswalde; Brandenburg; Germany
- Coordinates: 51.6430°N 13.1735°E
- Owner: Deutsche Bahn
- Operator: DB Station&Service
- Lines: Dessau–Falkenberg/Elster railway (KBS 216)
- Platforms: 2 side platforms
- Tracks: 2
- Train operators: DB Regio Südost
- Connections: 527 527e

Construction
- Parking: yes
- Cycle facilities: yes
- Accessible: partly

Other information
- Station code: 1780
- DS100 code: LFMW
- IBNR: 8011537
- Category: 6
- Fare zone: : 7452; MDV: 298 (only if traveling between MDV zones)
- Website: www.bahnhof.de

Services
Preceding station	DB Regio Südost	Following station
Annaburg towards Magdeburg Hbf	RE 14	Falkenberg (Elster) Terminus
Annaburg towards Dessau Hbf	RB 51	Falkenberg (Elster) Terminus
Location
- Location within Brandenburg Location within Germany Location within Europe

Fermerswalde station (German: Bahnhof Fermerswalde) is a railway station in the municipality of Fermerswalde, located in the Elbe-Elster district in Brandenburg, Germany.
