= Herzberg (Elster) station =

Railway station in Germany

Herzberg (Elster) Herzberg (Elster) West
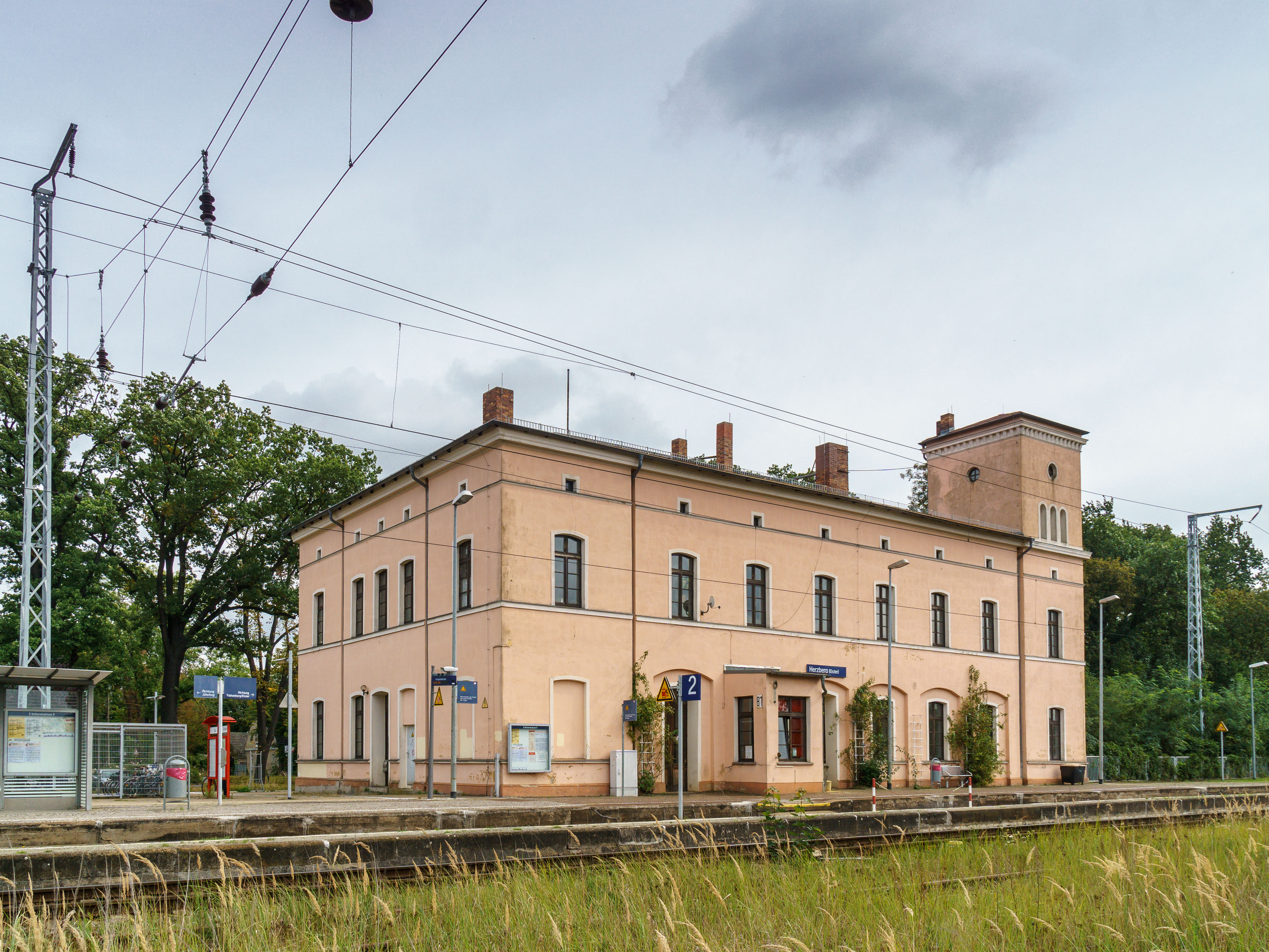
- 2017

General information
- Location: Anhalterstraße 148; 04916 Herzberg (Elster); Brandenburg; Germany
- Coordinates: 51°40′46″N 13°12′11″E
- Owner: Deutsche Bahn
- Operator: DB Netz; DB Station&Service
- Line: Jüterbog–Röderau railway
- Platforms: 2 side platforms
- Tracks: 2
- Train operators: DB Regio Nordost

Construction
- Accessible: No

Other information
- Station code: 2739
- DS100 code: LHZW
- IBNR: 8011867
- Category: 6
- Fare zone: : 7352; MDV: 298 (only if traveling between MDV zones)
- Website: www.bahnhof.de

Services
Preceding station	DB Regio Nordost	Following station
Holzdorf (Elster) towards Rathenow or Stendal Hbf	RE 4	Falkenberg (Elster) Terminus
Location
- Location within Brandenburg Location within Germany Location within Europe

Herzberg (Elster) station is a railway station in the municipality of Herzberg (Elster), located in the Elbe-Elster district in Brandenburg, Germany.
