= Berlin-Anhalt Railway Company =

The Berlin-Anhalt Railway Company (German: Berlin-Anhaltische Eisenbahn-Gesellschaft, BAE) was a railway company in Prussia. The railway connection between Berlin and Köthen, built by the BAE, was one of the first long-distance railways in Germany.

== History ==
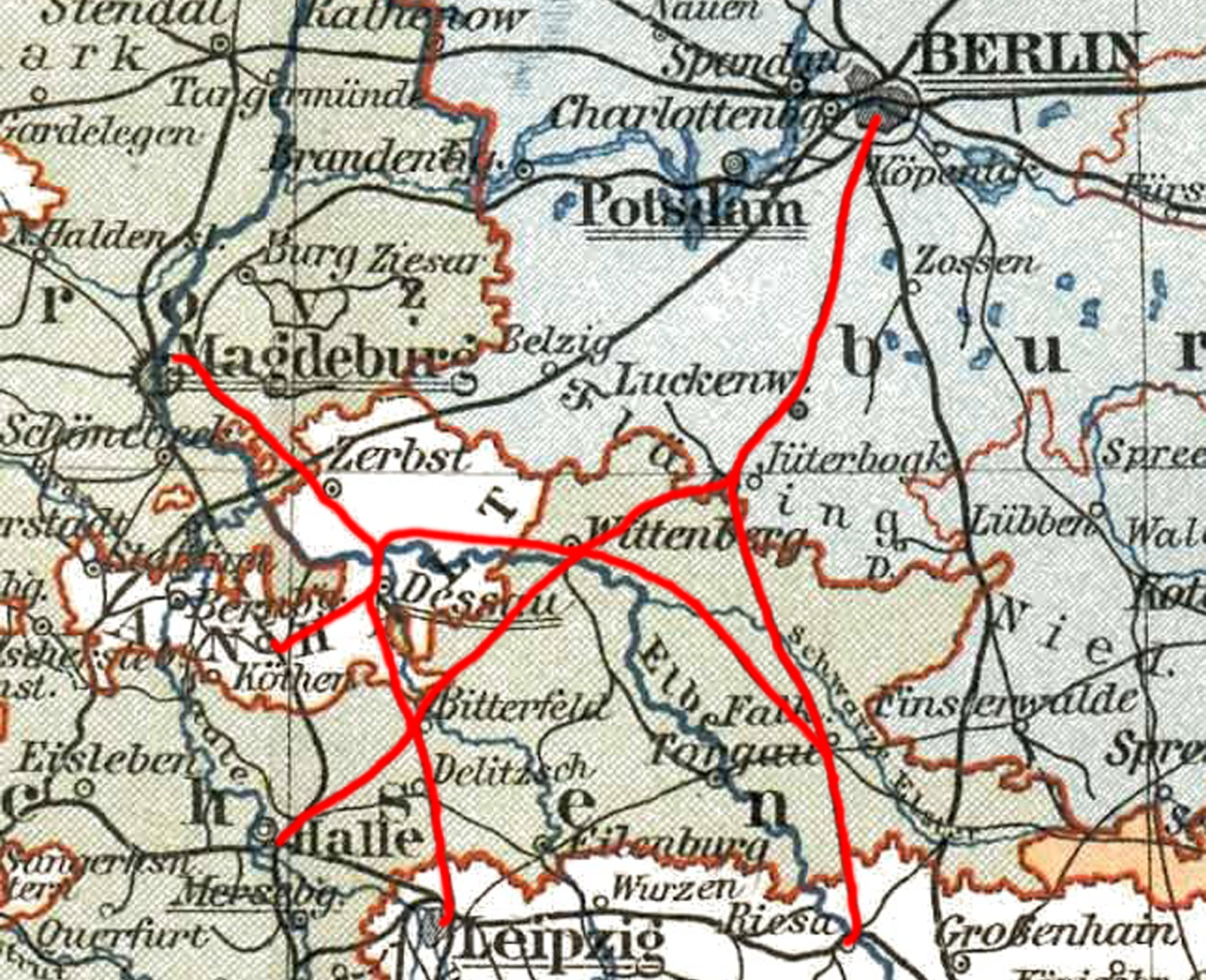
The railway network of the Berlin-Anhaltische Eisenbahn-Gesellschaft around 1875

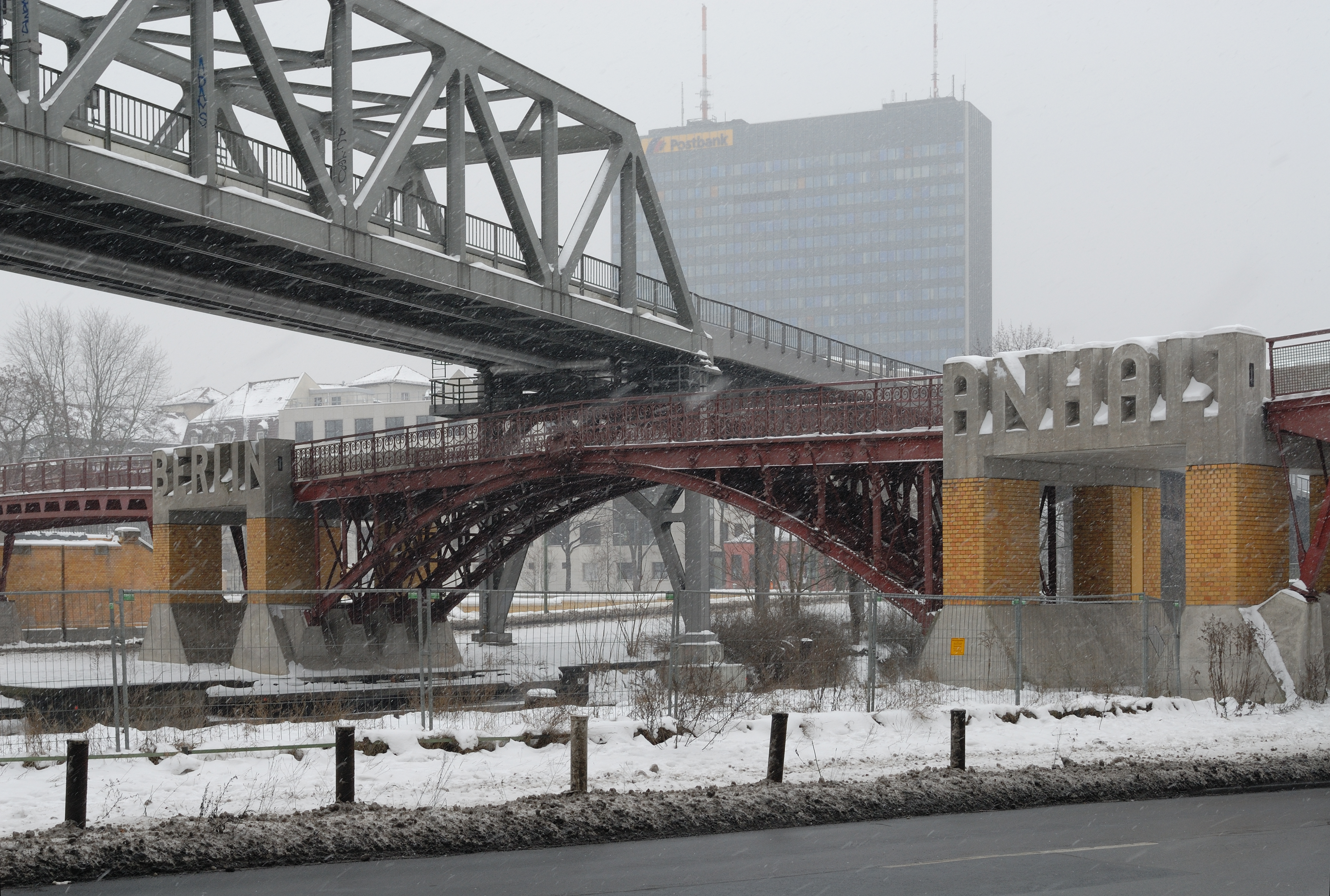
"Berlin"-"Anhalt" sculpture on replacement of former railway bridge in Berlin

The Berlin-Anhalt Railway Company was one of the most important railway companies in Germany for about four decades in the 19th century. In addition to the main Anhalt Railway, the BAE built a network of important railway connections between Berlin and the northern parts of the Kingdom of Saxony, the Prussian Province of Saxony, and the duchy of Anhalt, with a total length of 430 kilometers at its apex.

An initial plan to build a railway between Berlin and Riesa, which would have connected to the Leipzig–Dresden railway, failed due to the railway politics of the state of Prussia. Therefore, in 1836 the company decided to pursue an alternative route in the direction of the duchy of Anhalt, and in 1839 changed its name from Berlin-Sächsische Eisenbahn-Gesellschaft to Berlin-Anhaltische Eisenbahn-Gesellschaft.

The first railway constructed by the BAE was the 21-kilometer-long line between Köthen and the ducal residency of Dessau, which opened on 1 September 1840. In mid-August 1841, this line was then extended by another 37 kilometers to Wittenberg, made famous by Martin Luther.

On 1 July 1841, the railway ran from the northern terminus of the line, at the Anhalter Bahnhof in Berlin, for a distance of 63 kilometers to Jüterbog. The 32-kilometer-long gap between Jüterbog and Wittenberg was closed on 10 September 1841. This meant that Köthen became the first railway node in Germany, where the new BAE line met with the Magdeburg-Leipzig Railway, which had opened for service on 9 June 1840.

It took until 1848 before the company was able to complete the original plan of running a rail line from Jüterbog via Falkenberg to Riesa. On 2 July 1848 trains started to travel to Herzberg an der Elster, and on 1 October 1848 they reached Röderau/Riesa.

About 10 years later the railways of the Berlin-Anhaltische Eisenbahn-Gesellschaft reached the railway nodes of Halle (Saale) and Leipzig. From the 17 August 1857, a line ran initially from Dessau to Bitterfeld. From the 1 February 1859, two lines traveled from there to Halle and Leipzig. On 3 August 1859, when Wittenberg was connected to Bitterfeld, the railway network of the BAE had grown by another 125 kilometers.

The construction of new lines, as well as the growth of competition from other railway companies, forced the constant adjustment of railway services to correspond with the needs of the day. This meant that the initial railway connection Berlin–Wittenberg–Dessau–Köthen faded in significance and became a branch line (Nebenbahn). At the time, passenger rail traffic experienced steady growth, and with the continued expansion of industrialization, which required reliable supply of fuel and raw material, especially brown coal from the central German strip mines, rail transport saw a growth period.

It was not until the 1870s, however, before the network was further expanded. On the 1 October 1871, the BAE purchased the 13-kilometer-long Anhaltischen Leopoldsbahn, which travels from Rosslau to Zerbst, and which had originally opened on 1 November 1863. On the 1 July 1874, the BAE completed an expansion to Magdeburg, and managed the 5-kilometer-long section to the Anhalt-Prussian border.

On the 15 October 1875, the line between Wittenberg and Falkenberg was put into service, which completed the railway network of the Berlin-Anhaltische Eisenbahn-Gesellschaft. The BAE did expand its influence again when it acquired the management rights of the tracks of the Oberlausitzer Eisenbahn-Gesellschaft on the 1 July 1878, which ran from Falkenberg via Elsterwerda–Hoyerswerda, and across the Lausitzer Neiße river to Kohlfurt. This line had been opened on the 1 June 1874 and was 148 kilometers in length.

Service opening dates:

- Berlin–Wittenberg–Köthen (10 September 1841)
- Jüterbog–Riesa (1 October 1848)
- Bitterfeld–Leipzig (1 February 1859)
- Bitterfeld–Halle (1 February 1859)
- Zerbst-Magdeburg (1 July 1874)
- Wittenberg–Falkenberg/Elster (15 October 1875)

At the beginning of 1882, the Prussian state assumed the management of the rail lines of the Berlin-Anhaltische Eisenbahn-Gesellschaft, and when Prussia also assumed the ownership of the lines four years later, the company dissolved.

The Anhalt railway was one of the most important long-distance railways in Germany at the time of its opening. Some of the first express trains traveled from Berlin via Köthen to Halle, Leipzig, Frankfurt am Main and Munich, as well as to Dresden, Prague, and Vienna via Jüterbog-Röderau. A direct result of these connections was the construction of the monumental Berlin Anhalter Bahnhof.

== See also ==
Anhalt Leopold Railway
