= Jessen (Elster) station =

Railway station in Germany

Jessen (Elster)
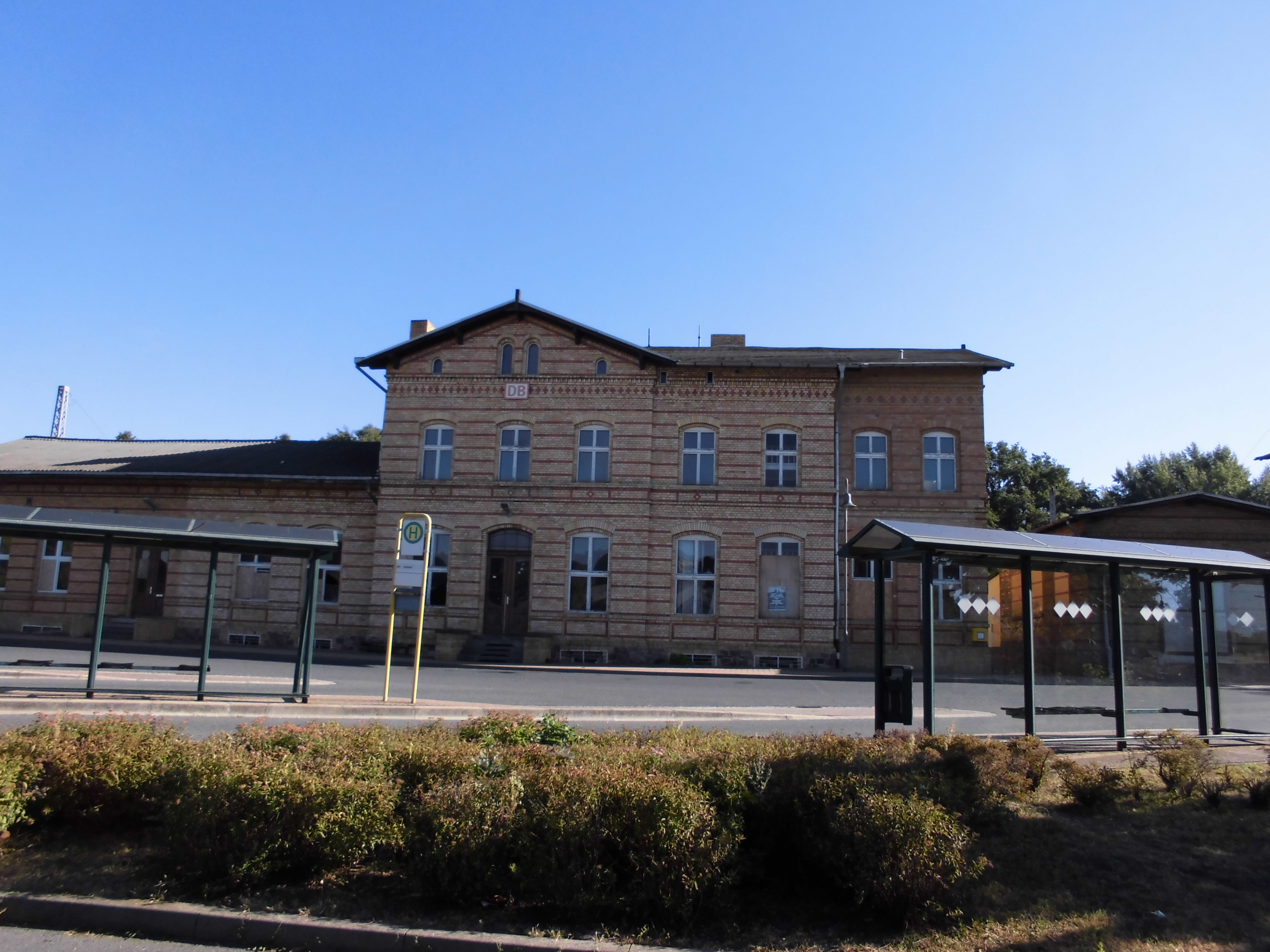
- 2016

General information
- Location: Bahnhofstraße; 06917 Jessen (Elster); Saxony-Anhalt; Germany
- Coordinates: 51.7927°N 12.9545°E
- Owner: Deutsche Bahn
- Operator: DB Station&Service
- Lines: Dessau–Falkenberg/Elster railway (KBS 216)
- Platforms: 2 side platforms
- Tracks: 3
- Train operators: DB Regio Südost
- Connections: 360 361 363 364 365 303H 303W

Construction
- Parking: yes
- Cycle facilities: yes
- Accessible: yes

Other information
- Station code: 3050
- DS100 code: LJN
- IBNR: 8011960
- Category: 6
- Fare zone: MDV: 289 (rail only)
- Website: www.bahnhof.de

Services
Preceding station	DB Regio Südost	Following station
Elster (Elbe) towards Magdeburg Hbf	RE 14	Annaburg towards Falkenberg (Elster)
Elster (Elbe) towards Dessau Hbf	RB 51	Annaburg towards Falkenberg (Elster)
Location
- Location within Saxony-Anhalt Location within Germany Location within Europe

Jessen (Elster) station (German: Bahnhof Jessen (Elster)) is a railway station in the municipality of Jessen (Elster), located in the Wittenberg district in Saxony-Anhalt, Germany.
