= Halle-Sorau-Guben Railway Company =

Former German railway company

The Halle-Sorau-Guben Railway Company (Halle-Sorau-Gubener Eisenbahn-Gesellschaft (HSGE) was a private German railway company, which was founded in 1868 in Berlin. From 1872, its headquarters were in Halle an der Saale.

== History ==
The company was founded by Bethel Henry Strousberg. In the following years it built a network of railway lines in the former Prussian provinces of Brandenburg and Saxony. The first 38 km section from Guben to Cottbus was opened on 1 September 1871. It was extended by 79 km on 1 December 1871 to the west via Calau, Finsterwalde and Dobrilugk to Falkenberg/Elster. The following year saw the completion of additional main lines with a total length of 270 km. It was possible to run to the west from Falkenberg via Torgau to Eilenburg (46 km) from 1 May 1872 and a further 51 km via Delitzsch to Halle an der Saale from 30 June 1872.

A new route was opened in an easterly direction from Cottbus to Forst (Lausitz) on 1 March 1872 and it was extended by 60 km over the Neisse to Sorau (now Żary in present-day Poland) from 30 June 1872.

A 24 km-long line was opened to connect with the trading centre of Leipzig on 1 November 1874 from Eilenburg via was Taucha in the Kingdom of Saxony. The HSGE network eventually comprised a network that was about 300 kilometres long. However, it was not possible to divert substantial traffic from the competing routes that had been built earlier, so its income fell short of expectations. Its management was transferred to the Prussian state railways on 1 January 1877 to increase efficiency and the HSGE was nationalised in 1885.

== The lines ==
- Cottbus–Guben (opened on 1 September 1871)
- Cottbus–Sorau (opened on 30 June 1872)
- Falkenberg/Elster–Cottbus (opened on 1 December 1871)
- Halle–Eilenburg–Falkenberg/Elster (opened on 30 June 1872)
- Leipzig–Eilenburg (opened on 1 November 1874)
