= Halle–Cottbus railway =

Railway line in Germany

Halle–Cottbus–(Guben) railway

Overview
- Line number: 6345
- Locale: Saxony-Anhalt, Saxony and Brandenburg

Service
- Route number: 209.43 (Falkenberg–Cottbus); 215 (Eilenburg–Cottbus); 219 (Halle–Eilenburg); 228 (Eilenburg–Falkenberg)

Technical
- Line length: 176.0 km (109.4 mi)
- Track gauge: 1,435 mm (4 ft 8 1/2 in) standard gauge
- Electrification: 15 kV 16.7 Hz
- Operating speed: 120 km/h (max)

The Halle–Cottbus railway is a 176 km long double-track electrified main line in the German states of Saxony-Anhalt, Saxony and Brandenburg. It was opened in 1871 and 1872. It formed the central section of the network of the Halle-Sorau-Guben Railway Company. Today it is part of a connection between the Central Germany and Poland.

Before German reunification, the line was also served by express trains, but it is now mainly used by regional and international freight traffic.

== History ==
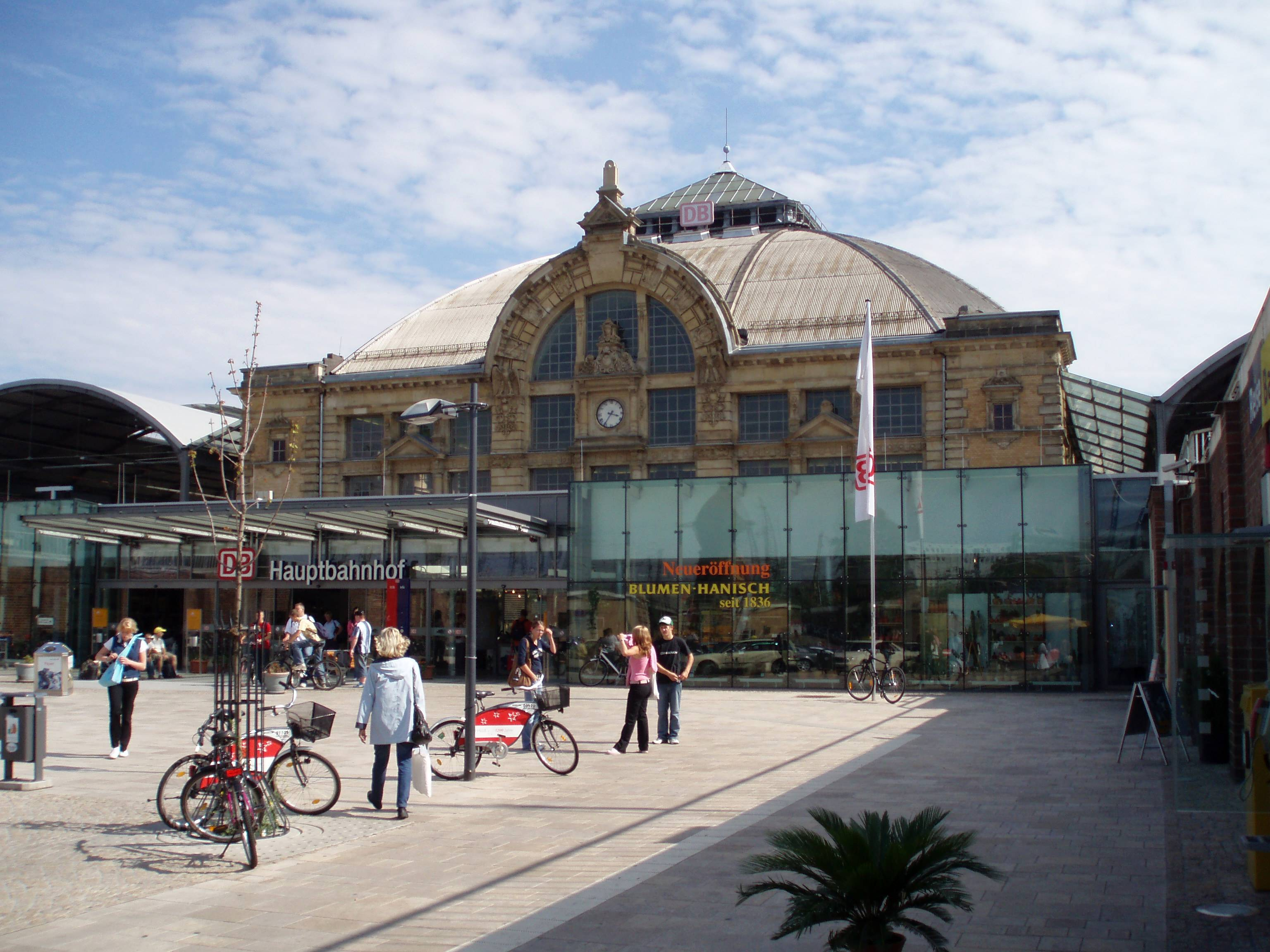
Halle (Saale) Hauptbahnhof

On 1 December 1871, the Halle-Sorau-Guben Railway Company (Halle-Sorau-Gubener Eisenbahn, HSGE) opened the Cottbus–Falkenberg/Elster section after its extension towards Guben was opened earlier the same year. Six months later, on 1 May 1872, trains ran via Falkenberg to Eilenburg and, two more months later, on 30 June 1872, operations on the line were extended as far as Halle. It did not connect with many of the former Prussian private railways that it crossed, as there were no at-grade connections with the existing lines, but they were mainly crossed on grade-separated crossings. There are two two-level stations in Doberlug-Kirchhain (at the intersection with the Berlin–Dresden railway) and at Falkenberg/Elster (intersection with the line of the former Berlin-Anhalt Railway Company). In Delitzsch, it built its own station separately from the existing station. On 1 November 1874, the connecting line from Eilenburg to Leipzig was opened.

The line was doubled by 1911. By the end of the Second World War, the line was an important connection from Central Germany to Silesia. A number of through coaches ran to and from western Germany. Leipzig was also served with through coaches via Eilenburg.

=== Between 1945 and 1990 ===
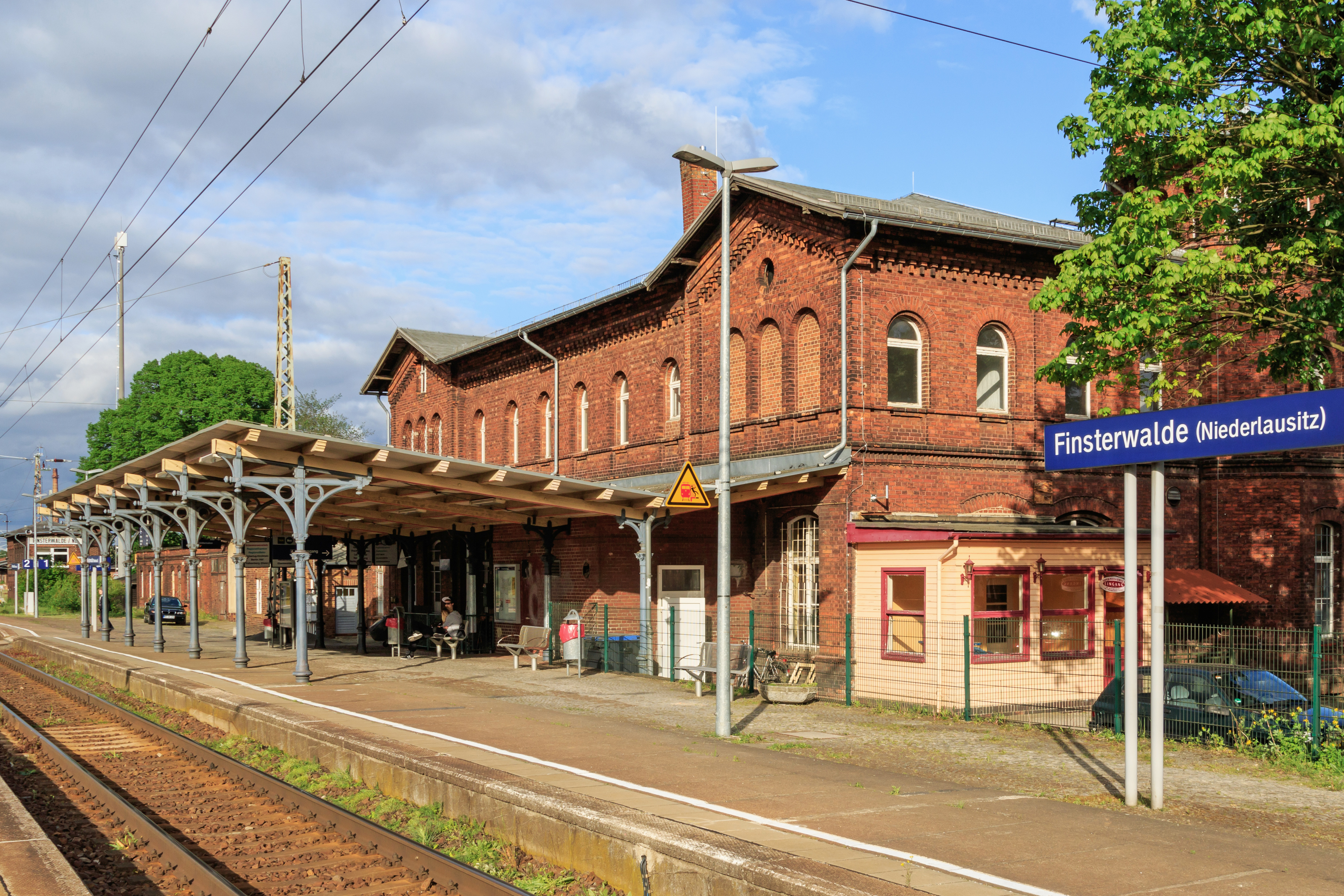
Finsterwalde station

The role of the route changed after 1945. Due to the new East German border along the Oder–Neisse line, the importance of traffic heading east decreased, but gradually new passenger and freight traffic flows resulted from the growing industrial centres in the region, such as Cottbus, Guben and Eisenhüttenstadt.

The second track, which had been removed after 1945 as war reparations, was rebuilt by 1970. The railway was electrified between 1984 and 1989 in several sections.

A number of long-distance trains ran on the Cottbus–Eilenburg section, continuing towards Leipzig, until 1990. For example, services between Frankfurt (Oder) and Frankfurt (Main) and between Cottbus and Erfurt. Similarly, there was an international express service from Leipzig to Kraków. Typical stops for long-distance services were Calau, Finsterwalde, Doberlug-Kirchhain, Falkenberg (Elster), Torgau and Eilenburg. The Eilenburg–Halle section, however, primarily served regional passenger and freight traffic, at least since 1945.

=== After 1990 ===
In 1992, express services on the line began to be operated at regular intervals, with through trains (Durchgangszug) operating every two hours. An InterRegio service was established in 1995 with trains running from Cottbus to Leipzig, continuing via Magdeburg and Schwerin to Lübeck. In 1999 every second train, and a year later all trains, were replaced by Regional-Express services.

== Passengers ==
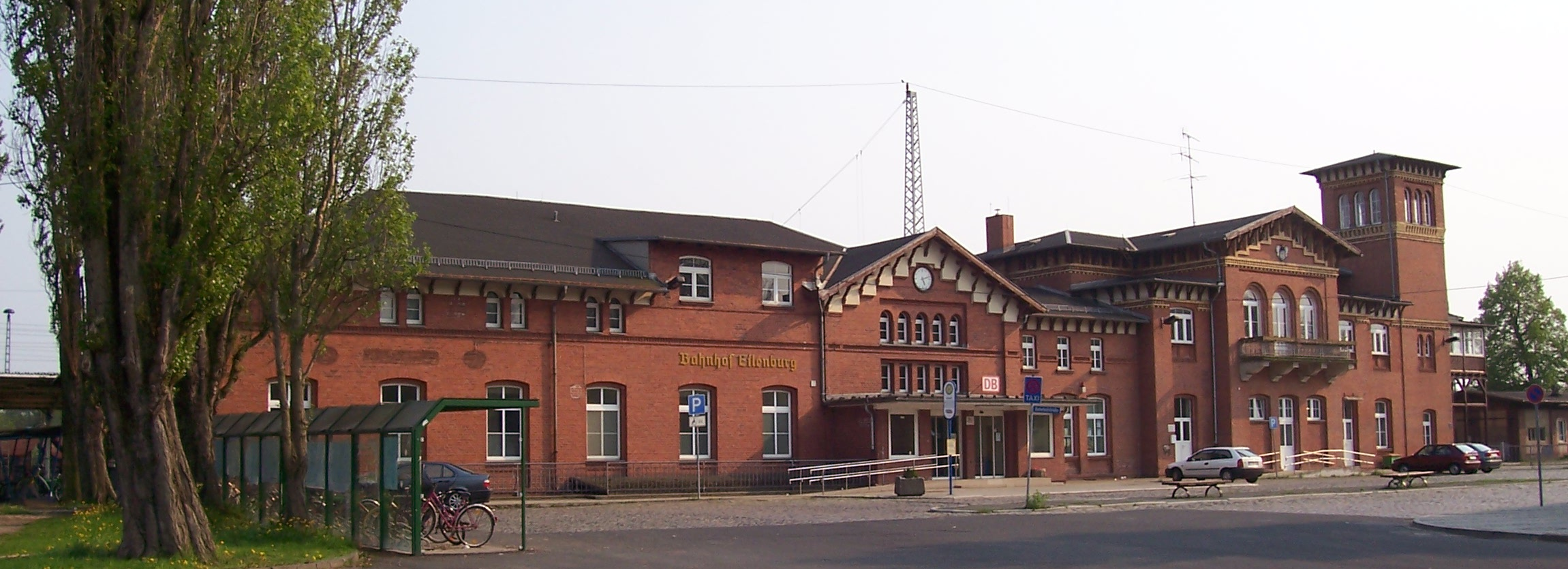
Eilenburg station

Regional-Express trains run every two hours between Cottbus and Eilenburg, continuing to Leipzig. Regionalbahn trains also run between Cottbus and Falkenberg and line S4 of the Mitteldeutschland S-Bahn (Geithain–Leipzig–Hoyerswerda) also run between Falkenberg and Eilenburg, resulting in each case in services running approximately once an hour. Between Halle and Eilenburg Regionalbahn trains run every one or two hours. Most services in this section have been run since December 2008 by Mitteldeutsche Regiobahn, a brand of Veolia Verkehr Regio Ost.

Due to the cuts to public transport funding adopted by the Saxon government in 2010, amounting to €24 million for 2011 and €35 million in 2012, at least a partial reduction in services between Halle and Eilenburg was considered by Zweckverband für den Nahverkehrsraum Leipzig (the Leipzig local transport association, ZVNL), but this was averted. Thus, the services on the route were maintained to Eilenburg. Nevertheless, the continuation of passenger services on this section is not certain. With the commissioning of the City Tunnel in Leipzig the ZVNL plans to discontinue all passenger transport services between Eilenburg and Halle and the future of the Eilenburg–Delitzsch section is to be examined. Thus the branch line to Leipzig would play an important role and would be used as the regular route. In contrast, Nahverkehrsservice Sachsen-Anhalt (Saxony-Anhalt local transport service) is planning to upgrade the track infrastructure from the current operating speed of up to 100 km/h to at least 120 km/h by 2015 and an increase of service frequency so that they run every 60 minutes.

=== Rollingstock ===
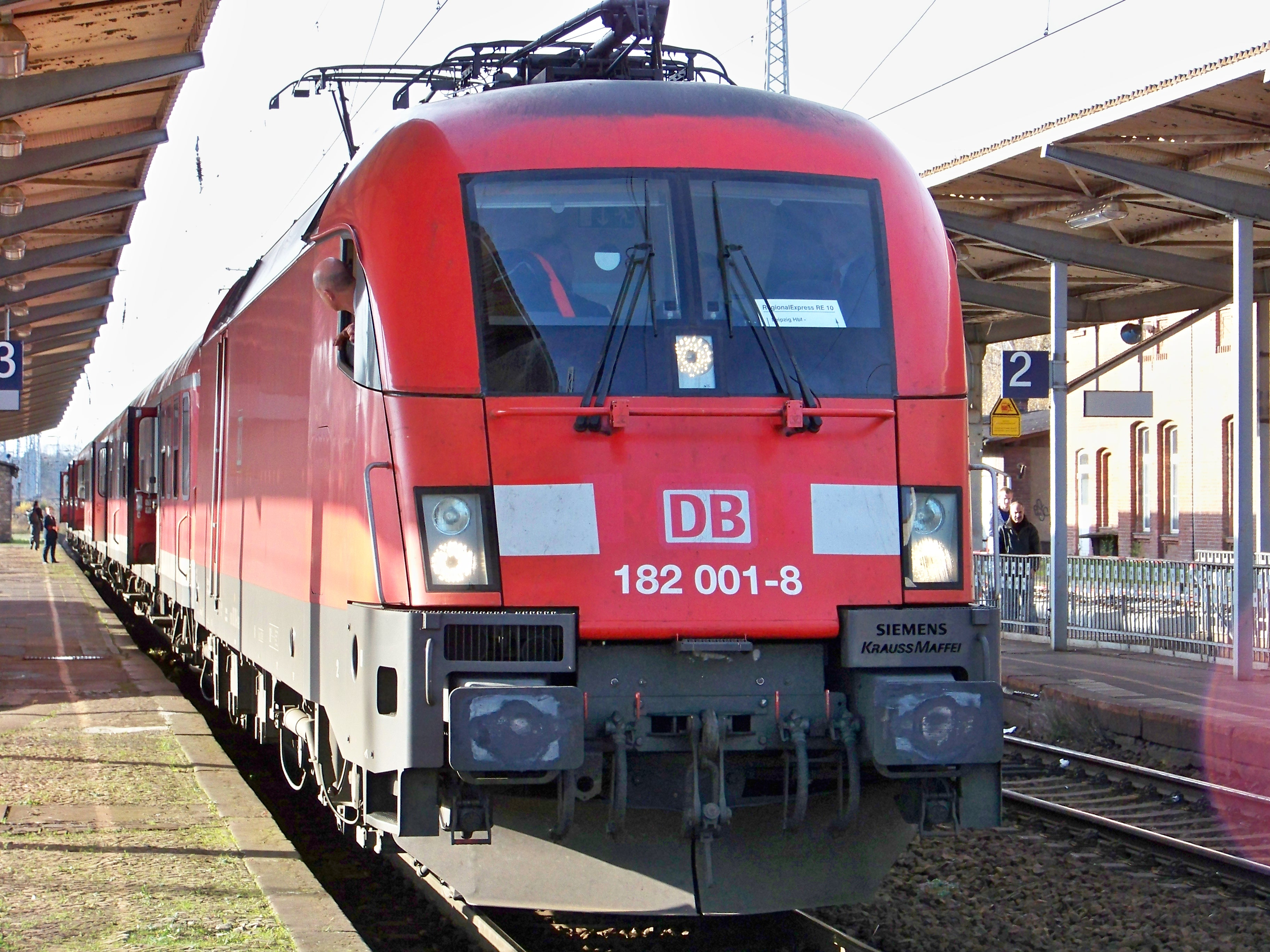
DB 182 001 with RE 10 in Eilenburg station

Different rollingstock are used on line. The Deutsche Bahn sets for the Halle–Eilenburg Regionalbahn service are composed of locomotives of class 143 hauling one or two double-decker carriages plus a control car and since December 2013 Bombardier Talent 2 multiple units are used for line S4 (Leipzig–Hoyerswerda) of the Mitteldeutschland S-Bahn, which uses the section of the line from Eilenburg to Falkenberg/Elster.

Mitteldeutsche Regiobahn operates the Halle–Eilenburg route with Stadler Regio-Shuttle RS1 or Siemens Desiro Classic diesel railcars, possibly also in double traction.

The Regional-Express line between Leipzig and Cottbus (part of the line from Eilenburg) was operated for two years with class 182 locomotives and four former InterRegio carriages (converted Deutsche Reichsbahn express carriages) plus a control car. Bombardier Talent 2 multiple units were intended to be substituted in December 2009. Due to delays in the approval process, the start date was postponed several times. The first trains of this type have operated since the beginning of 2013.

== Freight ==
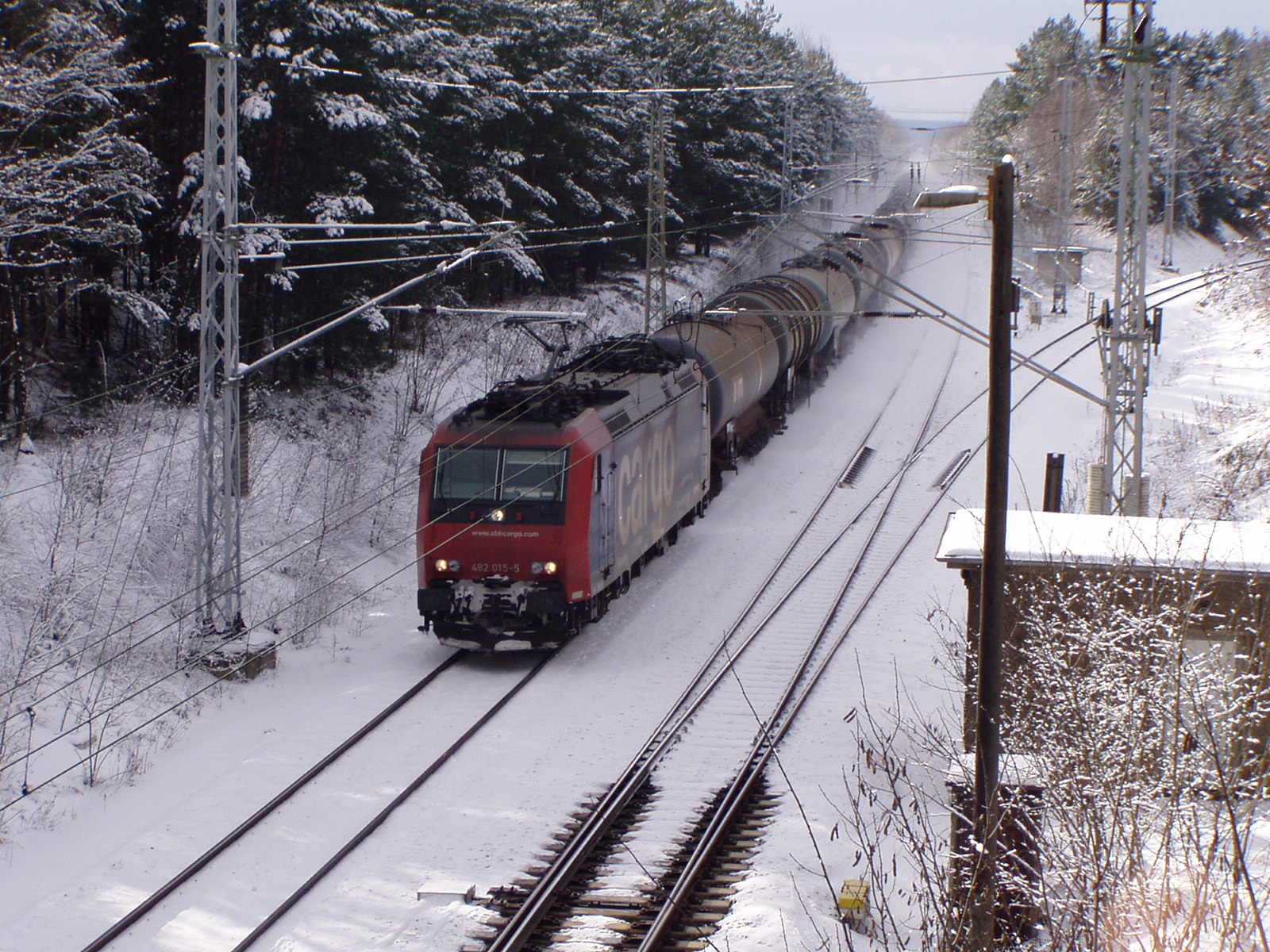
A locomotive of class 482 of the SBB with a train of tanks wagons at the junction of the Berlin–Dresden railway

The track is used by freight trains, running from Falkenberg/Elster for instance or formed in Eilenburg and running towards the freight centre in Halle (Saale). Moreover, it has become increasingly important for freight to and from Eastern Europe, branching in Falkenberg via Hoyerswerda to Węgliniec to Poland (Węgliniec–Roßlau railway). After the completion of the construction work between Horka and Hoyerswerda, traffic on the line, according to Deutsche Bahn publicity, will increase from the current 40 freight trains to 160 freight trains daily on the Falkenberg–Eilenburg–Halle/Leipzig section, thus making the line a major international freight route.

The BLG Logistics Group announced in May 2011 that it would invest €10 million in Falkenberg on 20 of the 40 tracks to form a marshalling yard, including a workshop, for freight trains for transporting cars to and from eastern Europe. The trains will run between Eastern Europe and the ports of Bremerhaven and Cuxhaven among others.
