= Herzberg (Elster) =

- Town
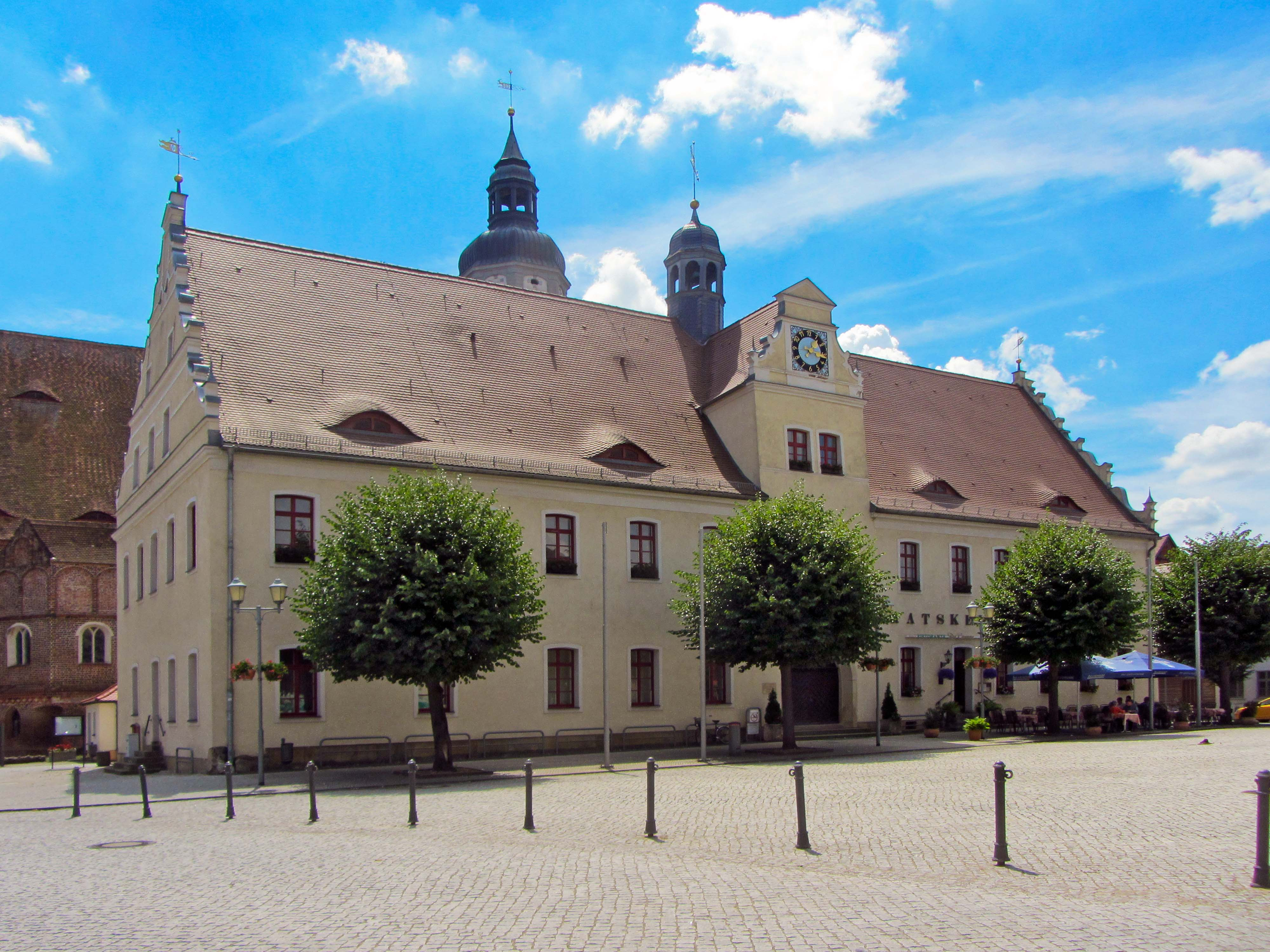
- Town hall

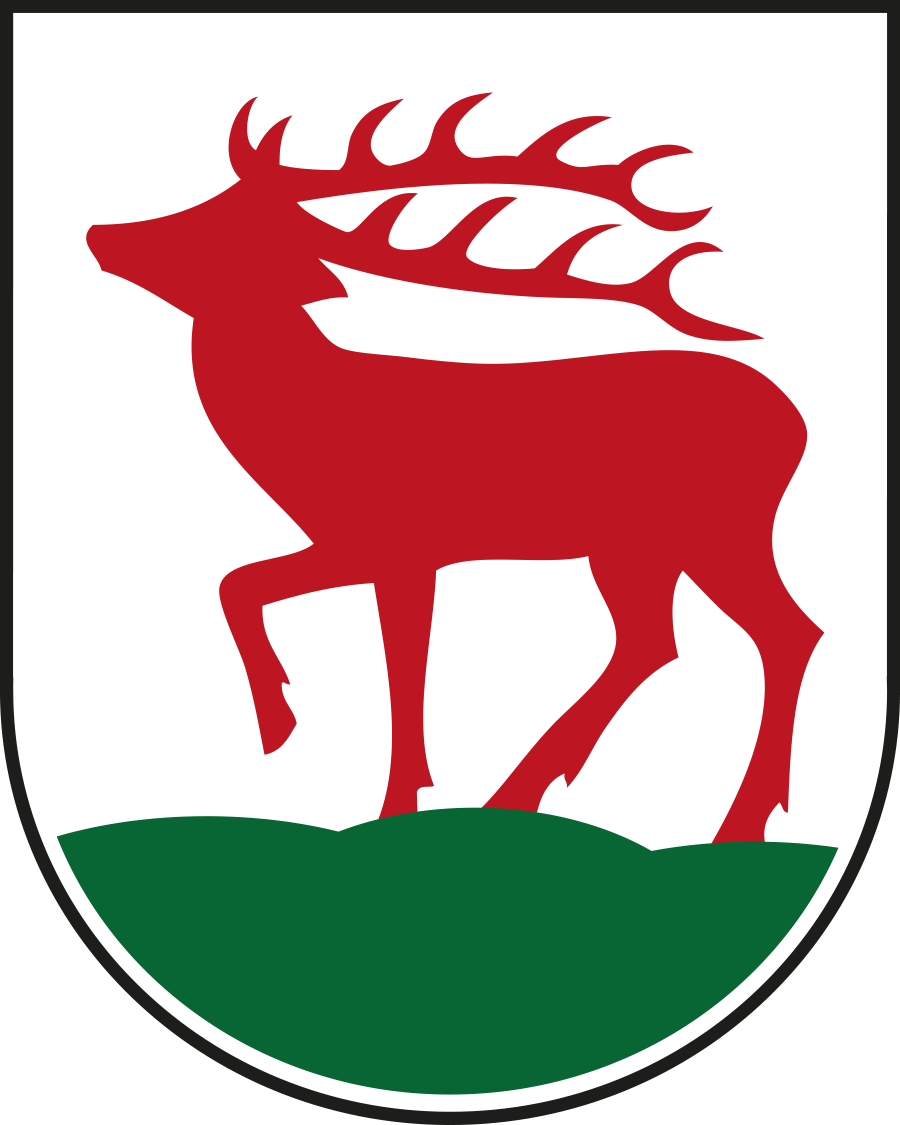
- Coat of arms

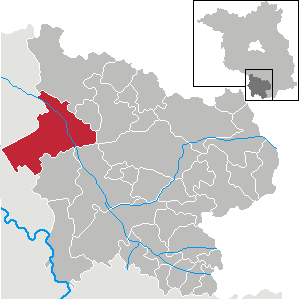
- Location of Herzberg within Elbe-Elster district
- Interactive map of Herzberg
- Location within Germany Location within Brandenburg
- Coordinates: 51°41′N 13°14′E
- Country: Germany
- State: Brandenburg
- District: Elbe-Elster

Government
  - Mayor (2025–33): Karsten Eule-Prütz (Ind.)

Area
  - Total: 149.02 km^{2} (57.54 sq mi)
- Elevation: 81 m (266 ft)

Population (2025-12-31)
  - Total: 8,753
  - Density: 58.74/km^{2} (152.1/sq mi)
- Time zone: UTC+01:00 (CET)
  - Summer (DST): UTC+02:00 (CEST)
- Postal codes: 04916
- Dialling codes: 03535
- Vehicle registration: EE, FI, LIB
- Website: herzberg-elster.de

Herzberg (Elster) (German pronunciation: [ˈhɛʁtsˌbɛʁk]) is a town in the Elbe-Elster district of the German federal state of Brandenburg.

== Overview ==
From 1939 to 1945 it was home to the Deutschlandsender Herzberg/Elster, a huge longwave transmitter, whose mast was the second tallest construction in the world, at Herzberg/Elster. The basement of the mast is still there.

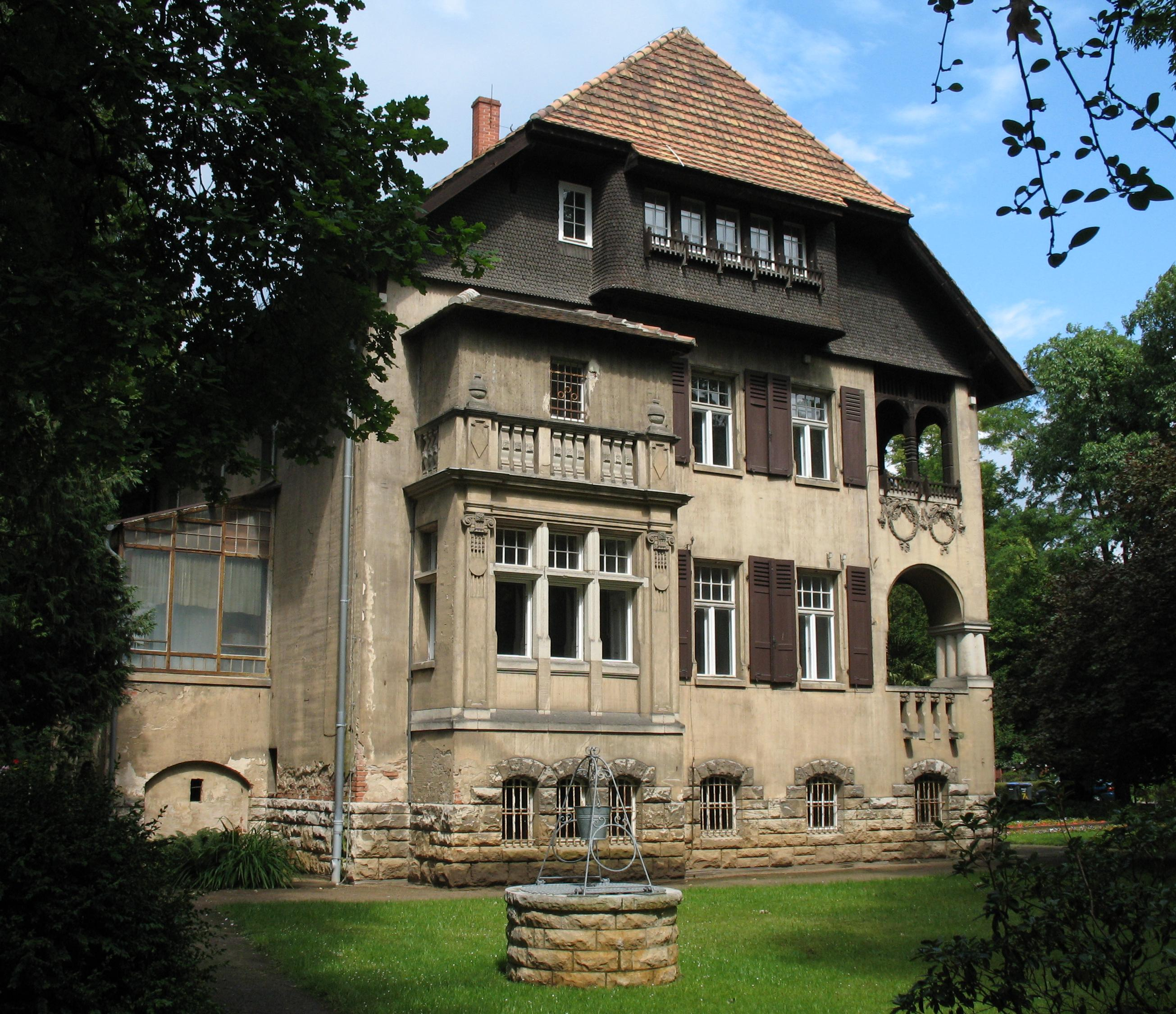
Villa Marx.

== History ==
From 1815 to 1944, Herzberg was part of the Prussian Province of Saxony. From 1944 to 1945, it was part of the Province of Halle-Merseburg. From 1952 to 1990, it was part of the Bezirk Cottbus of East Germany.

== Demography ==
Development of population since 1875 within the current boundaries (Blue line: Population; dotted line: comparison to population development of Brandenburg state; grey background: time of Nazi rule; red background: time of Communist rule)

Recent population development (blue line) and forecasts

Herzberg (Elster): Population development
within the current boundaries (2025)

Year	Pop.	±% p.a.
1875	8,259	—
1890	8,865	+0.47%
1910	8,337	−0.31%
1925	8,250	−0.07%
1933	8,715	+0.69%
1939	9,346	+1.17%
1946	12,457	+4.19%

Year	Pop.	±% p.a.
1950	12,479	+0.04%
1964	11,474	−0.60%
1971	12,091	+0.75%
1981	11,956	−0.11%
1985	11,899	−0.12%
1990	12,165	+0.44%
1995	11,897	−0.44%

Year	Pop.	±% p.a.
2000	11,380	−0.88%
2005	10,930	−0.80%
2010	9,982	−1.80%
2015	9,067	−1.90%
2020	8,776	−0.65%
2025	8,753	−0.05%

== Twin towns ==
Herzberg (Elster) is twinned with the following cities:

- (Germany) Büdingen, Hesse
- Świebodzin, Poland
- Dixon, United States of America
- Soest, Germany

== People ==
- Johannes Clajus (1535–1592), grammarian
- Louise von François (1817–1893), narrator and writer
- Werner Janensch (1878–1969), paleontologist and geologist
- Steffen Zesner (* 1967), world class swimmer
- Georg Christian Schemelli (1676-1762), church musician
