= Dabendorf station =

Railway station in Zossen, Germany

Dabendorf

General information
- Location: Dabendorf, Brandenburg; Germany
- Coordinates: 52°14′13″N 13°26′15″E
- Line: Berlin–Dresden railway
- Platforms: 2
- Tracks: 2

Construction
- Accessible: Yes

Other information
- Station code: 1098
- DS100 code: BDAB
- Category: 5
- Fare zone: VBB: 6156
- Website: www.bahnhof.de

History
- Opened: 1 May 1899

Services
Preceding station	Ostdeutsche Eisenbahn	Following station
Rangsdorf towards Wismar	RE 8	Zossen towards Elsterwerda
Rangsdorf towards Nauen	RB 10	Zossen towards Wünsdorf-Waldstadt
Preceding station	DB Regio Nordost	Following station
Rangsdorf towards Eberswalde Hbf	RB 24	Zossen towards Wünsdorf-Waldstadt
Location

Dabendorf (German: Bahnhof Dabendorf) is a railway station in the town of Dabendorf, Brandenburg, Germany. The station lies of the Berlin–Dresden railway and the train services are operated by Deutsche Bahn.

In the 2026 timetable the following regional services stop at the station:

Line	Route	Frequency
RE 8	Eberswalde – Bernau – Lichtenberg – Berlin Ostkreuz – Schöneweide – Dabendorf – Blankenfelde – Wünsdorf-Waldstadt – Luckau-Uckro – Doberlug-Kirchhain – Elsterwerda	Every 2 hours
RB 10	Wünsdorf-Waldstadt – Dabendorf – Dahlewitz – Blankenfelde – Südkreuz – Potsdamer Platz – Berlin Hbf – Spandau – Falkensee – Nauen	Hourly
RB 24	Eberswalde – Bernau – Lichtenberg – Ostkreuz – BER Airport – Dabendorf – Wünsdorf-Waldstadt	Hourly
