= Rangsdorf station =

Station in Rangsdorf, Brandenburg, Germany

Rangsdorf
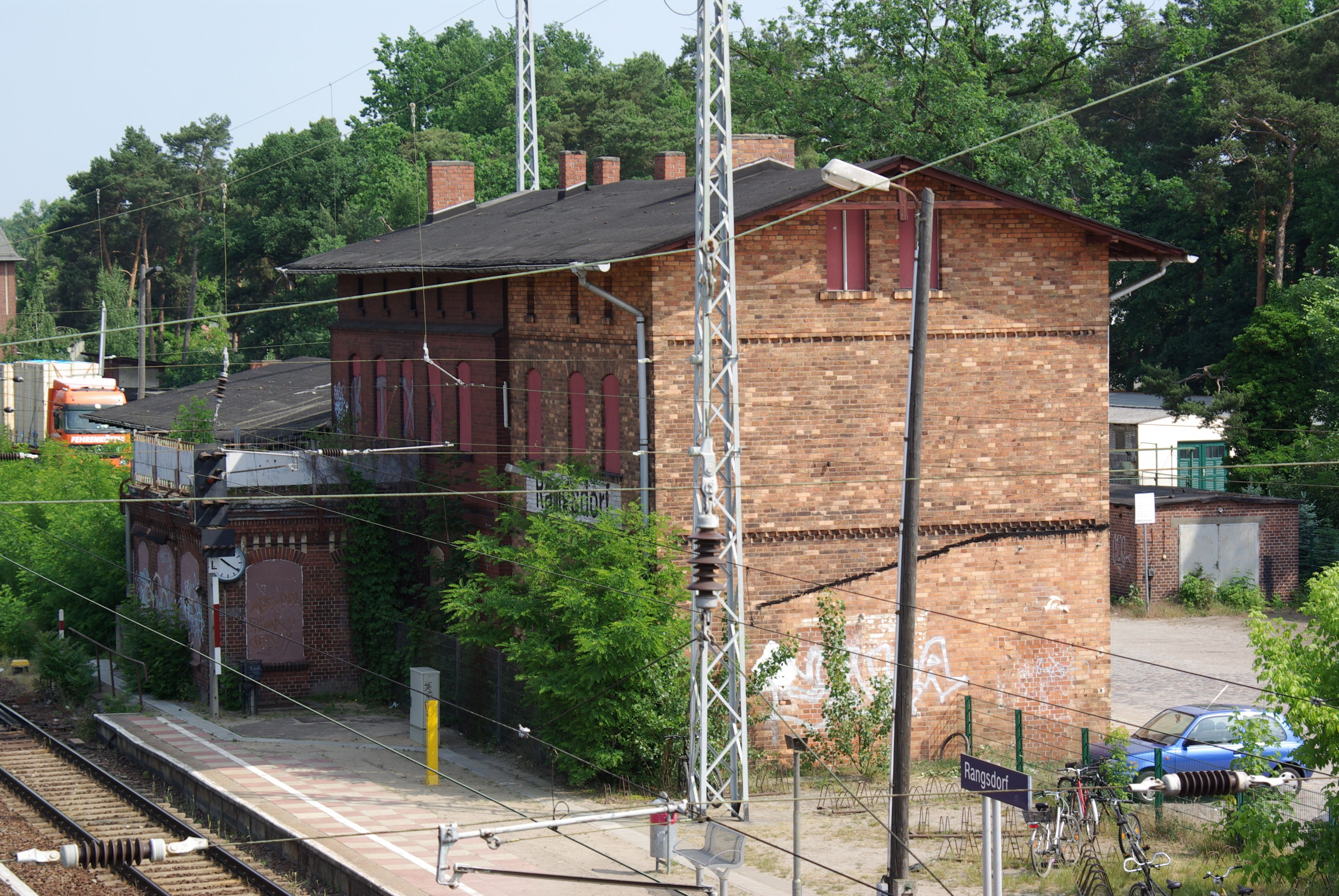
- Rangsdorf railway station

General information
- Location: Am Bahnhof1, Rangsdorf, Brandenburg; Germany
- Coordinates: 52°17′40″N 13°25′49″E
- Lines: Berlin–Dresden railway; Royal Prussian Military Railway (dismantled)
- Platforms: 2

Construction
- Accessible: Yes

Other information
- Station code: 5118
- DS100 code: BRSF
- IBNR: 8012713
- Category: 5
- Fare zone: VBB: Berlin C/6056
- Website: www.bahnhof.de

History
- Opened: 17 June 1875; 151 years ago
- Closed: 12 September 1961; 64 years ago
- Electrified: 6 October 1940; 85 years ago main line: 22 May 1982; 44 years ago

Services
Preceding station	Ostdeutsche Eisenbahn	Following station
Dahlewitz towards Wismar	RE 8	Dabendorf towards Elsterwerda
Dahlewitz towards Nauen	RB 10	Dabendorf towards Wünsdorf-Waldstadt
Preceding station	DB Regio Nordost	Following station
Dahlewitz towards Eberswalde Hbf	RB 24	Dabendorf towards Wünsdorf-Waldstadt
Location
- Location within Brandenburg Location within Germany Location within Europe

Rangsdorf station is a station in the locality of Rangsdorf in the district of Teltow-Fläming in the German state of Brandenburg. It is located at kilometre 24.3 of Berlin–Dresden railway. Until 1919, the western part of the station was served by the Royal Prussian Military Railway.

== Location and infrastructure ==
The station is located in Fontaneplatz to the west of the centre of the village of Rangsdorf. It is at ground level and consists of three platforms for passenger traffic. The entrance building of the former Military Railway is located to the west of the tracks and is now used as a residential building. The entrance building of the former Berlin-Dresden railway is located on the eastern side. A third entrance was built at the southern end during the development of the former Military Railway platform for suburban traffic in 1940. A footbridge connects the platforms and both sides of the station.

The military station, which was later developed as a suburban station is listed as part of the Military Railway in the heritage list of Brandenburg.

== History ==
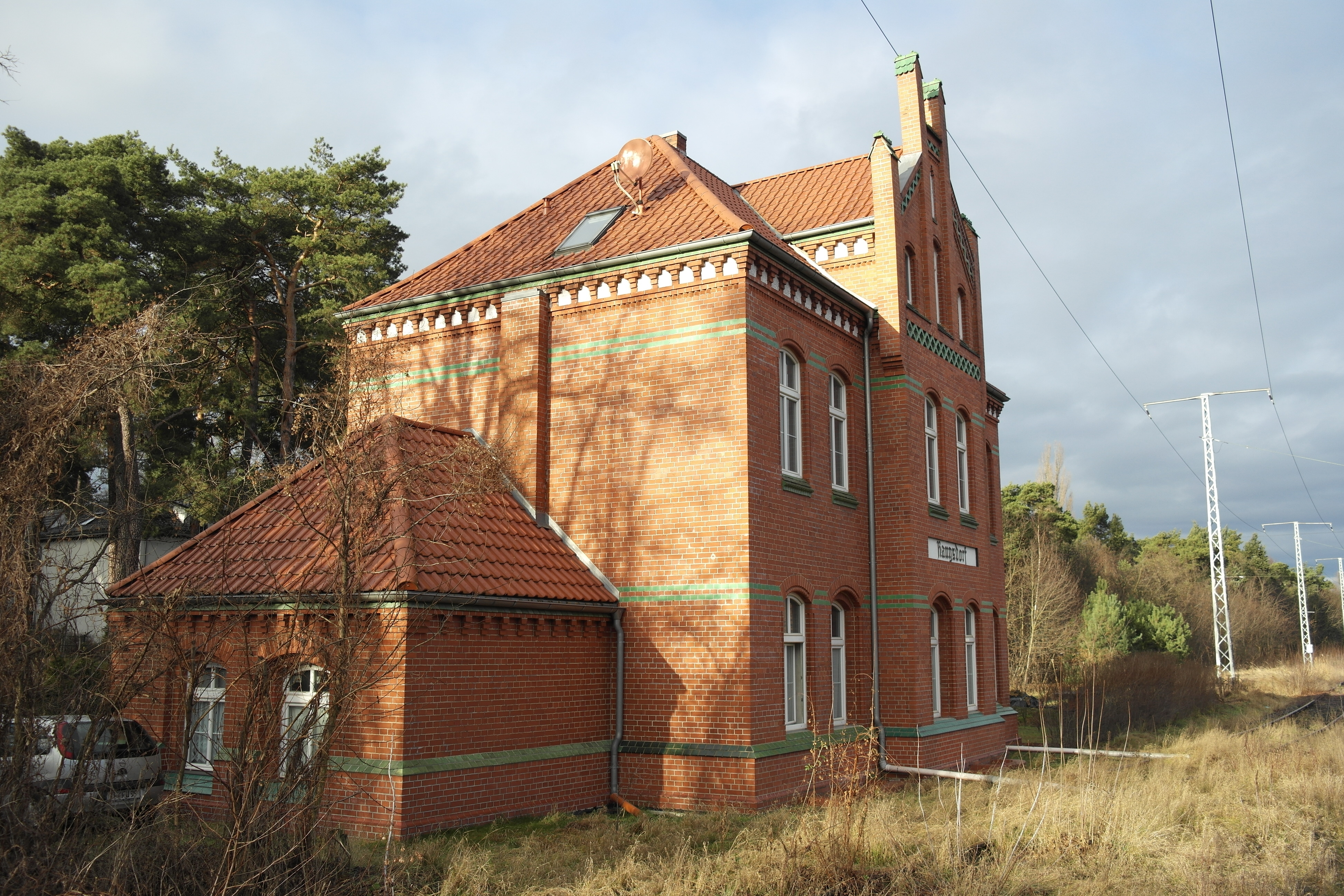
Heritage-listed station building of the Military Railway

The station, along with the Berlin-Dresden line of the Berlin-Dresden Railway Company (Berlin-Dresdener Eisenbahn-Gesellschaft) was opened on 17 June 1875. Four months later, the Royal Prussian Military Railway (Königlich Preußische Militär-Eisenbahn), which was built parallel with the Dresden Railway, was opened to Zossen. The military station was available for passenger traffic from 1890 and a separate entrance building was opened for the military station on the western side of the railway tracks ten years later.

Under the terms of the Treaty of Versailles, Germany was forbidden after the end of the First World War from continuing to operate the Military Railway. The approximately 30 kilometre-long track between Berlin and Zossen was dismantled in consequence and passenger trains then ran on the Dresden Railway. The entrance building of the Military Railway continued to be used as a residential building.

Deutsche Reichsbahn planned the electrification of the Dresden Railway between Berlin Priesterweg and Wünsdorf by 1 October 1940. In fact, electrification was completed only as far as Rangsdorf and this was opened to traffic on 6 October 1940. A second edge was added on the west side of the platform of the military station for the electric services, while steam-powered trains running to Wünsdorf stopped on the east side of the platform. At the same time the pedestrian bridge was built between the two sides. The main platform on the Dresden railway was subsequently closed. The war prevented any further electrification. The S-Bahn services operated every 20 minutes and connected with the suburban services to Wünsdorf.

There were no electric services from April 1945 to 1 October 1945 and in the interim steam trains operated. The second track of the Dresden Railways was dismantled for reparations to the Soviet Union and the earlier operation of mixed traffic on two tracks was replaced by steam-hauled and electric trains running on a single track. In 1952, the second track was rebuilt, but it was subsequently used only by S-Bahn trains. The trains ran at 30-minute intervals to Berlin. With the construction of the Berlin Wall on 13 August 1961, the S-Bahn service to Berlin was disrupted. At first trains ran to Mahlow as an isolated service. On 12 September 1961, this isolated service, however, was discontinued due to lack of carriage storage on the line and converted to steam-hauled operation. The steam trains then used on both tracks and the third rail of the western track was dismantled. The western edge of the suburban platform was no longer used.

As suburban services no longer terminated in Rangsdorf, but now ran further north, they changed tracks several times near the suburban platform. The eastern platform in front of the station building was therefore returned to service in 1970. In 1982, the Dresden Railway was electrified with overhead wire. This fact complicates plans to restore S-Bahn services to the station, which have been discussed repeatedly since 1990 without resolution.

In the course of the project to develop the Berlin–Dresden railway for speed of up to 200 km/h that began in May 2013, an extensive remodelling of Rangsdorf station was approved by the Federal Railway Authority on 19 March 2013. In the summer of 2013 the station building, the footbridge, the loading platform, the loading dock and the pumping station were demolished.

Next to each of the two main through tracks there will be a passing loop with a platform for regional services in each direction and to the north of the platforms there will be passing loops for freight trains. The level crossing south of the station will be replaced by railway bridges over the road and access to the platforms will be via stairs and lifts. The signalling and overhead line equipment will be renewed and the construction of noise barriers on both sides over a length of about one kilometre is also part of the project.

== Rail services ==
In the 2026 timetable the following regional services stop at the station:

Line	Route	Frequency
RE 8	Eberswalde – Bernau – Lichtenberg – Berlin Ostkreuz – Schöneweide – Rangsdorf – Blankenfelde – Wünsdorf-Waldstadt – Luckau-Uckro – Doberlug-Kirchhain – Elsterwerda	Every 2 hours
RB 10	Wünsdorf-Waldstadt – Rangsdorf – Dahlewitz – Blankenfelde – Südkreuz – Potsdamer Platz – Berlin Hbf – Spandau – Falkensee – Nauen	Hourly
RB 24	Eberswalde – Bernau – Lichtenberg – Ostkreuz – BER Airport – Rangsdorf – Wünsdorf-Waldstadt	Hourly

== Bus services ==
There are interchanges with the buses operated by the Verkehrsgesellschaft Teltow-Fläming (the municipal bus company of Teltow-Fläming).

== See also ==
- List of railway stations in Brandenburg
