= Zossen station =

Railway station in Zossen, Germany

Zossen
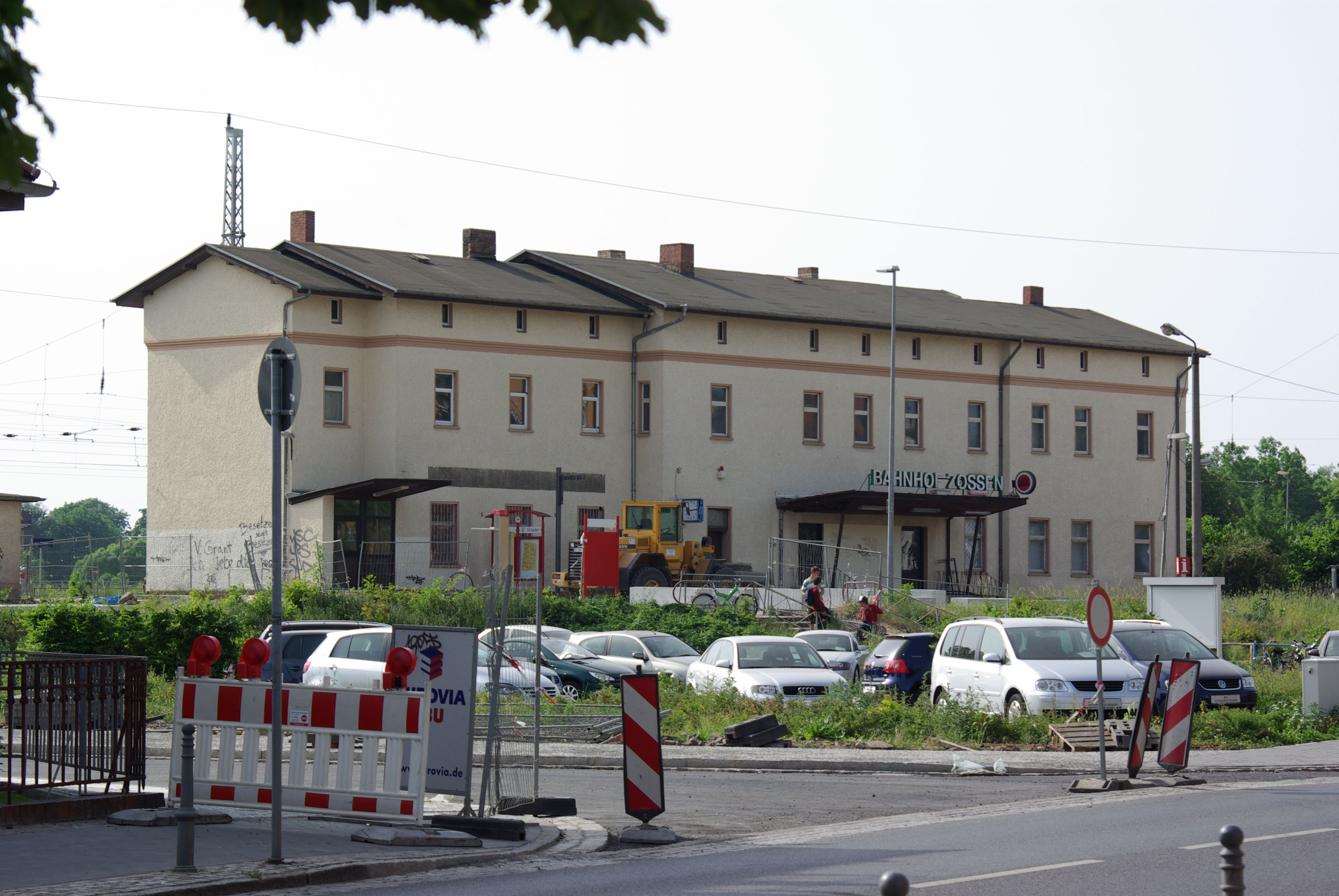
- Zossen railway station

General information
- Location: Zossen, Brandenburg; Germany
- Coordinates: 52°13′07″N 13°26′19″E
- Lines: Berlin–Dresden railway; Royal Prussian Military Railway (dismantled)
- Platforms: 4
- Tracks: 6

Construction
- Accessible: Yes

Other information
- Station code: 7048
- DS100 code: BZO
- Category: 5
- Fare zone: VBB: 6256
- Website: www.bahnhof.de

History
- Opened: 17 June 1875

Services
Preceding station	Ostdeutsche Eisenbahn	Following station
Dabendorf towards Wismar	RE 8	Wünsdorf-Waldstadt towards Elsterwerda
Dabendorf towards Nauen	RB 10	Wünsdorf-Waldstadt Terminus
Preceding station	DB Regio Nordost	Following station
Dabendorf towards Eberswalde Hbf	RB 24	Wünsdorf-Waldstadt Terminus
Location

Zossen (German: Bahnhof Zossen) is a railway station in the town of Zossen, Brandenburg, Germany. The station lies on the Berlin–Dresden railway and the train services are operated by Deutsche Bahn.

== History ==
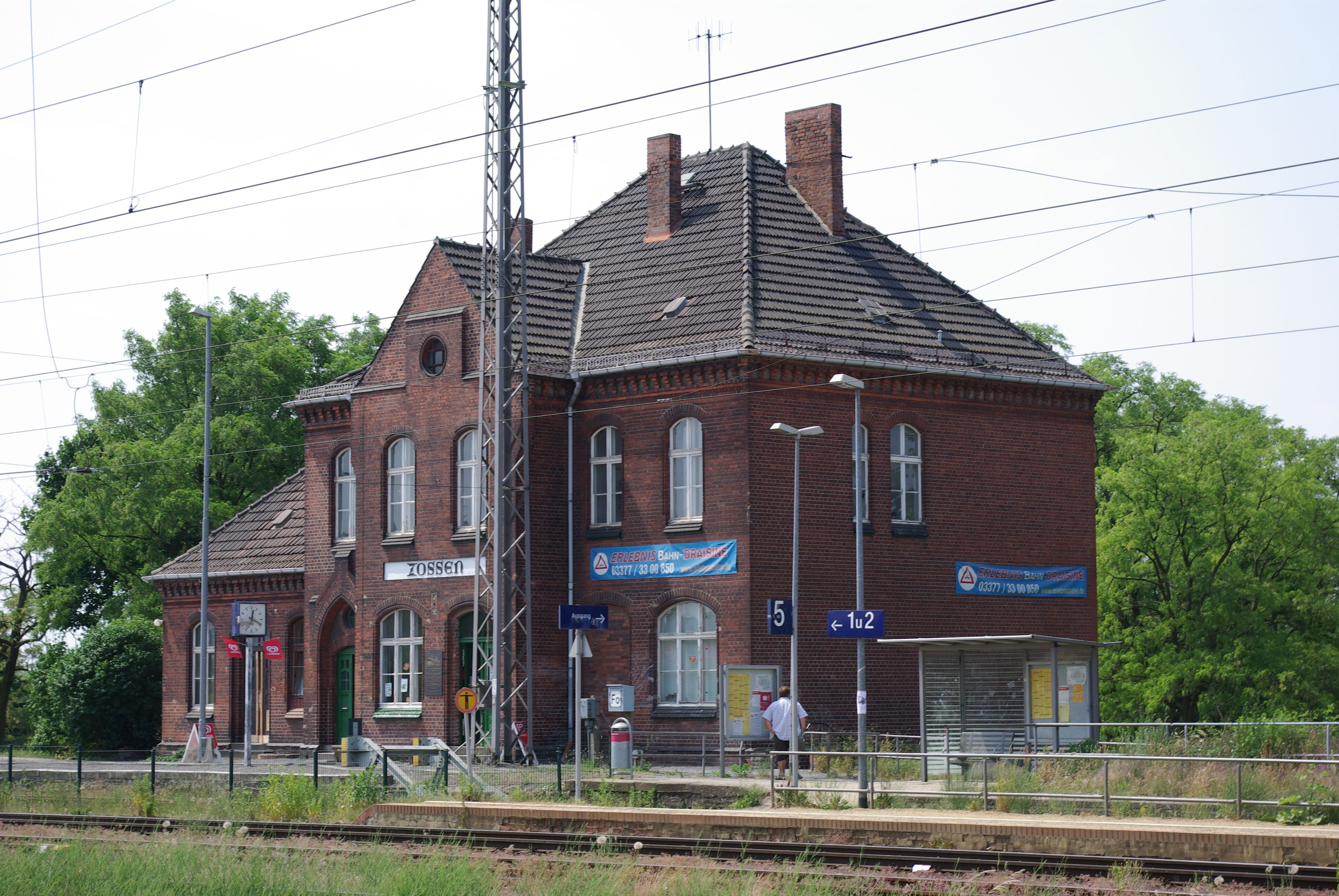
Station building of the former military railway

The station was opened together with the Berlin–Dresden railway on 17 June 1875. The Royal Prussian Military Railway to Kummersdorf was opened on 15 October 1875. It ran parallel to the line to Dresden which between Berlin-Schöneberg and Zossen and had its own station immediately west of the mainline station. The military railway was extended to Jüterbog in 1897. It also offered passenger services to the general public. The tracks of the military railway were lifted between Zossen and Berlin after World War I, so that Zossen became the junction station. The Zossen-Jüterbog line was handed over to Deutsche Reichsbahn. A line connecting Zossen and Mittenwalde (Mark) was built in 1945, lifted in 1947 and reopened in 1950.

Traffic on the Zossen-Jüterbog line ceased in 1998, on the line to Mittenwalde Ost by the end of 2011, reducing Zossen to an intermediate station on the Berlin–Dresden railway.

== Rail services ==
In the 2026 timetable the following regional services stop at the station:

Line	Route	Frequency
RE 8	Eberswalde – Bernau – Lichtenberg – Berlin Ostkreuz – Schöneweide – Zossen – Blankenfelde – Wünsdorf-Waldstadt – Luckau-Uckro – Doberlug-Kirchhain – Elsterwerda	Every 2 hours
RB 10	Wünsdorf-Waldstadt – Zossen – Dahlewitz – Blankenfelde – Südkreuz – Potsdamer Platz – Berlin Hbf – Spandau – Falkensee – Nauen	Hourly
RB 24	Eberswalde – Bernau – Lichtenberg – Ostkreuz – BER Airport – Zossen – Wünsdorf-Waldstadt	Hourly
