= Wünsdorf-Waldstadt station =

Railway station in Zossen, Germany

Wünsdorf-Waldstadt
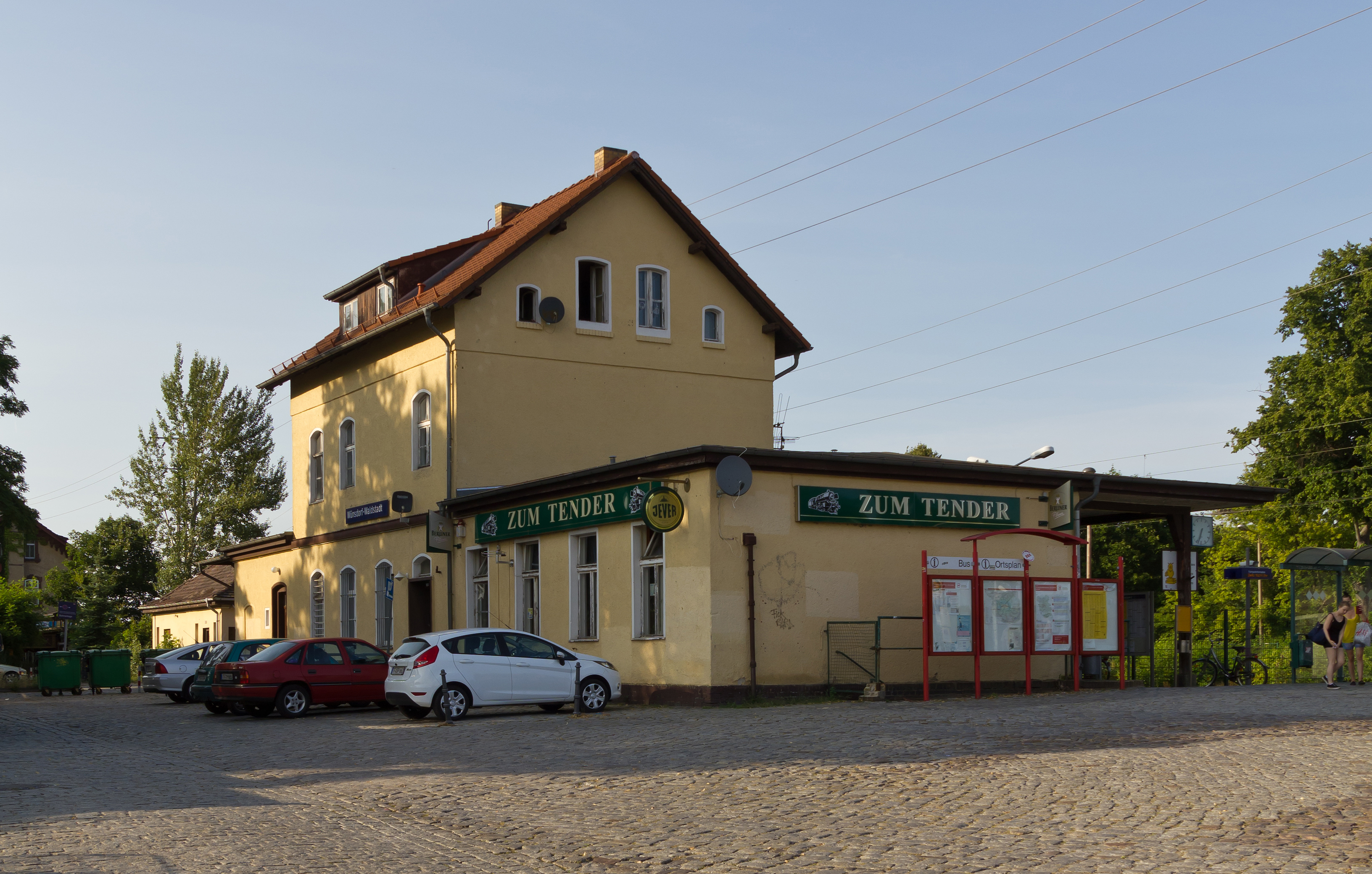
- Wünsdorf-Waldstadt railway station

General information
- Location: Wünsdorf, Brandenburg; Germany
- Coordinates: 52°09′56″N 13°28′04″E
- Line: Berlin–Dresden railway
- Platforms: 3
- Tracks: 7

Construction
- Accessible: Yes

Other information
- Station code: 6910
- DS100 code: BWUE
- Category: 5
- Fare zone: : 6357
- Website: www.bahnhof.de

History
- Opened: 1 May 1897

Services
Preceding station	Ostdeutsche Eisenbahn	Following station
Zossen towards Wismar	RE 8	Neuhof bei Zossen towards Elsterwerda
Zossen towards Nauen	RB 10	Terminus
Preceding station	DB Regio Nordost	Following station
Zossen towards Eberswalde Hbf	RB 24	Terminus
Location

Wünsdorf-Waldstadt (German: Bahnhof Wünsdorf-Waldstadt) is a railway station in the town of Wünsdorf, Brandenburg, Germany, on the Berlin–Dresden railway, with services operated by Ostdeutsche Eisenbahn and Deutsche Bahn.

In the 2026 timetable the following regional services stop at the station:

Line	Route	Frequency
RE 8	Eberswalde – Bernau – Lichtenberg – Berlin Ostkreuz – Schöneweide – Blankenfelde – Wünsdorf-Waldstadt – Luckau-Uckro – Doberlug-Kirchhain – Elsterwerda	Every 2 hours
RB 10	Wünsdorf-Waldstadt – Dahlewitz – Blankenfelde – Südkreuz – Potsdamer Platz – Berlin Hbf – Spandau – Falkensee – Nauen	Hourly
RB 24	Eberswalde – Bernau – Lichtenberg – Ostkreuz – BER Airport – Wünsdorf-Waldstadt	Hourly
