= Berlin-Schöneweide station =

Railway station in Berlin, Germany

Berlin Schöneweide Pbf
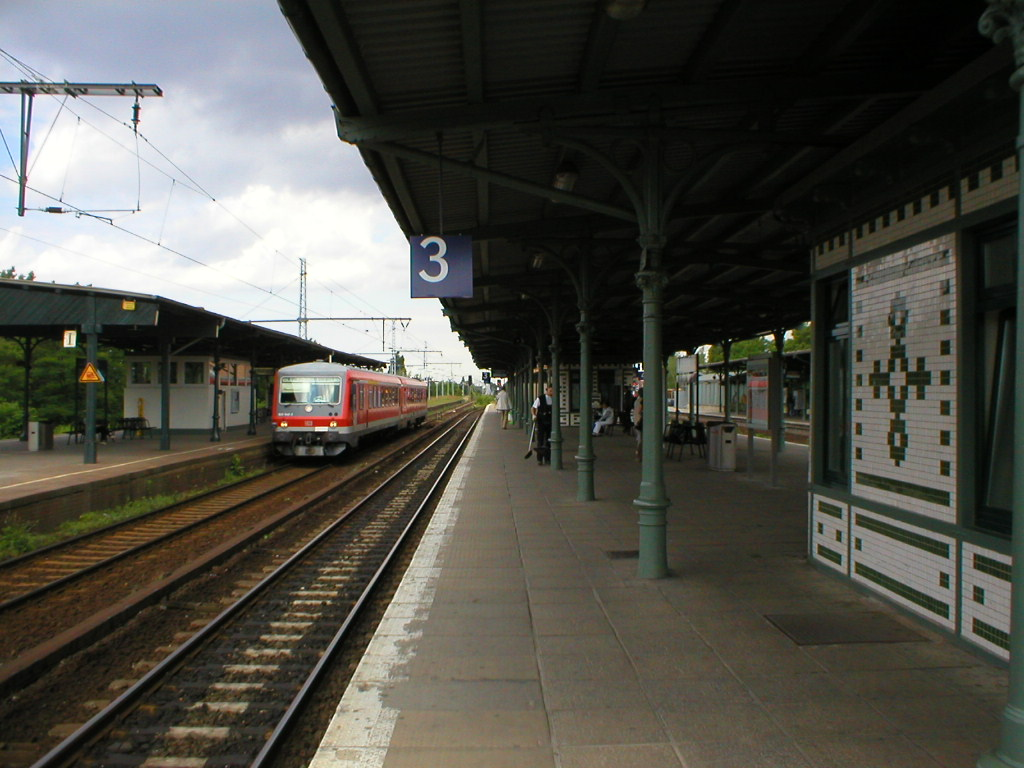

General information
- Location: Cajamarcaplatz 1, Niederschöneweide, Treptow-Köpenick, Berlin; Germany
- Coordinates: 52°27′18″N 13°30′34″E
- Lines: Berlin–Görlitz; Schöneweide–Spindlersfeld

Construction
- Accessible: Yes

Other information
- Station code: 559
- DS100 code: BSW
- IBNR: 8010041
- Category: 3
- Fare zone: : Berlin B/5656
- Website: www.bahnhof.de

History
- Opened: 24 May 1868; 158 years ago
- Electrified: 6 November 1928; 97 years ago, 750 V DC system (3rd rail) main line 2 June 1984; 42 years ago, 15 kV AC system (overhead)
- Former names: 1868-1874 Neuer Krug; 1874-1896 Neuer Krug-Johannisthal; 1886-1929 Niederschöneweide-Johannisthal
Services
Preceding station	DB Regio Nordost	Following station
Berlin Ostkreuz towards Eberswalde Hbf	RB 24	BER Airport towards Wünsdorf-Waldstadt
Berlin Ostkreuz towards Oranienburg	RB 32	BER Airport towards Ludwigsfelde
Preceding station	Berlin S-Bahn	Following station
Baumschulenweg towards Südkreuz	S45	Berlin-Johannisthal towards BER Airport
Baumschulenweg towards Westend	S46	Berlin-Johannisthal towards Königs Wusterhausen
Baumschulenweg towards Hermannstraße	S47	Oberspree towards Spindlersfeld
Baumschulenweg towards Birkenwerder	S8	Berlin-Johannisthal towards Wildau
Baumschulenweg towards Waidmannslust	S85	Berlin-Johannisthal towards Grünau
Baumschulenweg towards Spandau	S9	Berlin-Johannisthal towards BER Airport
Location

Berlin-Schöneweide is a railway station in Niederschöneweide, part of the Treptow-Köpenick borough of Berlin. It is served by the S-Bahn and regional trains, buses and trams. It was a terminal for long-distance trains until 2011.

== History ==
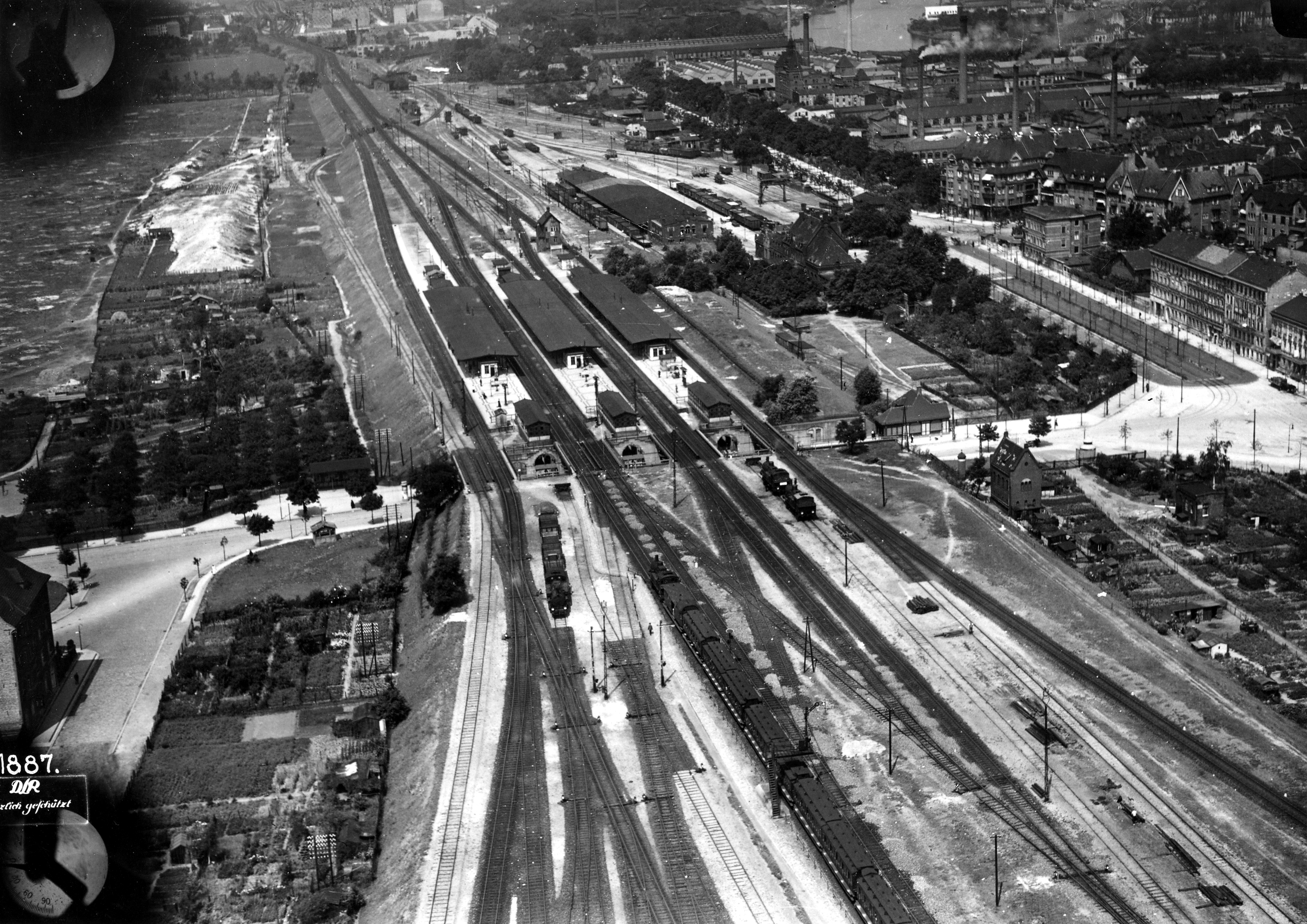
Station in aerial photograph from about 1920

The station was opened as a halt in the outskirts of the Landgemeinde (rural municipality) of Niederschöneweide on 24 May 1868 on the Berlin–Görlitz railway. Until 1874, it was called Neuer Krug (new tavern), the name of a nearby inn, after which it was renamed Neuer Krug-Johannisthal, after the rural municipality of Johannisthal, which was also near the station. In 1880–1882, it was rebuilt as a station.

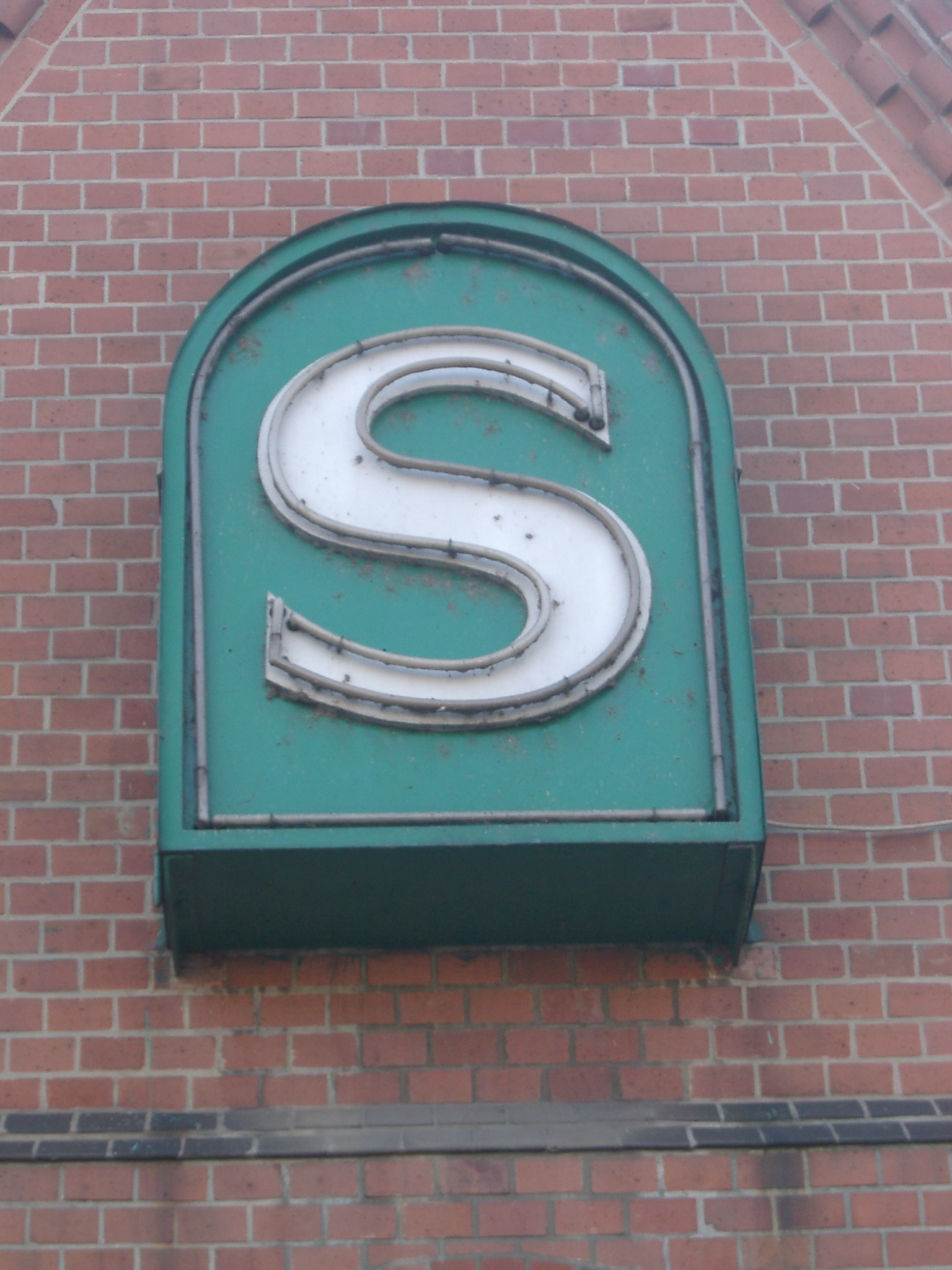
S-Bahn sign in the station

As Niederschöneweide and Oberschöneweide were industrialising rapidly, a particularly high number of railways were built in the district. Apart from the state railways, these included tramways and a network of industrial railways called the Bullenbahn (bulls railway). In 1890/91, a branch line to Spindlersfeld was opened from the station. This was used for trials of electric suburban passenger trains between 1903 and 1906, although suburban electric trains were not introduced in Berlin until the construction of the S-Bahn in the 1920s.

The station was renamed in 1896 as Niederschöneweide-Johannisthal at the request of the municipality of Niederschöneweide because Niederschöneweide had provided finance for the branch to Spindlersfeld. Several private industrial railways connected to the rail network in Niederschöneweide. Private railways also connected in nearby Oberschöneweide, such as the line built in 1889 by Emil Rathenau to AEG-owned factories, using a wooden bridge over the Spree, which is at the current location of the Stubenrauch bridge.

Due to the dense traffic of the main line it was necessary to separate the traffic connecting to the private lines. At the same time, the long-distance and the suburban railway tracks were separated and Schöneweide station was upgraded in the course of this work to the six tracks it has today. This work was completed on 1 May 1906.

In the second phase of the introduction of electrical operations in Berlin, Schöneweide station gained a new approach from the other side of the station. The 'Great Electrification' continued over the branch line to Spindlersfeld and to Grünau. On 6 November 1928, the first electric S-Bahn train ran to the station. In 1929, the station was renamed to its current name of Schöneweide.

With the Second World War and the subsequent division of Berlin, the Görlitz line, which ran almost entirely through East Germany (GDR), lost access to its terminal station, the Görlitzer Bahnhof, which was in Kreuzberg, now in West Berlin, and could not now be reached. The long-distance trains serving the stations (as distinct from halts) on the Görlitz line in Berlin (Baumschulenweg, Schöneweide, Adlershof and Grünau) were gradually rerouted to Lichtenberg. Schöneweide became a long-distance terminal after the closure of long-distance operations at the other three stations. It was developed as the third major long-distance station in East Berlin (after Ostbahnhof, later called Berlin Hauptbahnhof (central station), and Lichtenberg). Traffic to the southern areas of the GDR began and ended there. The long-distance tracks connecting the station and central Berlin were closed as a result of the widening of the adjacent federal highway 96a to six lanes.

After German reunification, long-distance services were gradually rerouted over the Stadtbahn or to Lichtenberg, although regional services were retained. Due to the need to rehabilitate a bridge at Ostkreuz station, regional trains, which had begun or ended at Lichtenberg, were moved to Schöneweide. From the timetable change of 11 December 2011, regional transport services no longer operated to Schöneweide. The Ostdeutsche Eisenbahn service OE 36 trains from Frankfurt (Oder) via Königs Wusterhausen, which formerly terminated at Schöneweide, now run directly to Lichtenberg. Since April 2016, the regional service RB 24 has served the station, reintroducing regional trains to Schöneweide.

== Train services ==
The station is served by the following service(s):

- Regional-Express RB 24 Eberswalde – Bernau – Berlin-Lichtenberg – Berlin Ostkreuz – Berlin-Schöneweide – BER Airport – Blankenfelde – Dahlewitz – Rangsdorf – Dabendorf – Zossen – Wünsdorf-Waldstadt
- Regionalbahn RB 32 Oranienburg – Berlin-Lichtenberg – Berlin Ostkreuz – Berlin-Schöneweide – BER Airport – Birkengrund – Ludwigsfelde
- Berlin S-Bahn services Südkreuz - Neukölln - Schöneweide - BER Airport - Terminal 1-2
- Berlin S-Bahn services Westend - Westkreuz - Innsbrucker Platz - Südkreuz - Neukölln - Schöneweide - Grünau - Königs Wusterhausen
- Berlin S-Bahn services Hermannstraße – Neukölln – Schöneweide – Spindlersfeld
- Berlin S-Bahn services Birkenwerder – Pankow – Prenzlauer Allee – Ostkreuz – Schöneweide – Grünau – Zeuthen – Wildau
- Berlin S-Bahn services Pankow – Prenzlauer Allee – Ostkreuz – Schöneweide
- Berlin S-Bahn services Spandau - Westkreuz – Hauptbahnhof - Alexanderplatz – Ostbahnhof – Schöneweide – BER Airport
