= Dahlewitz station =

Railway station in Dahlewitz, Germany

Dahlewitz
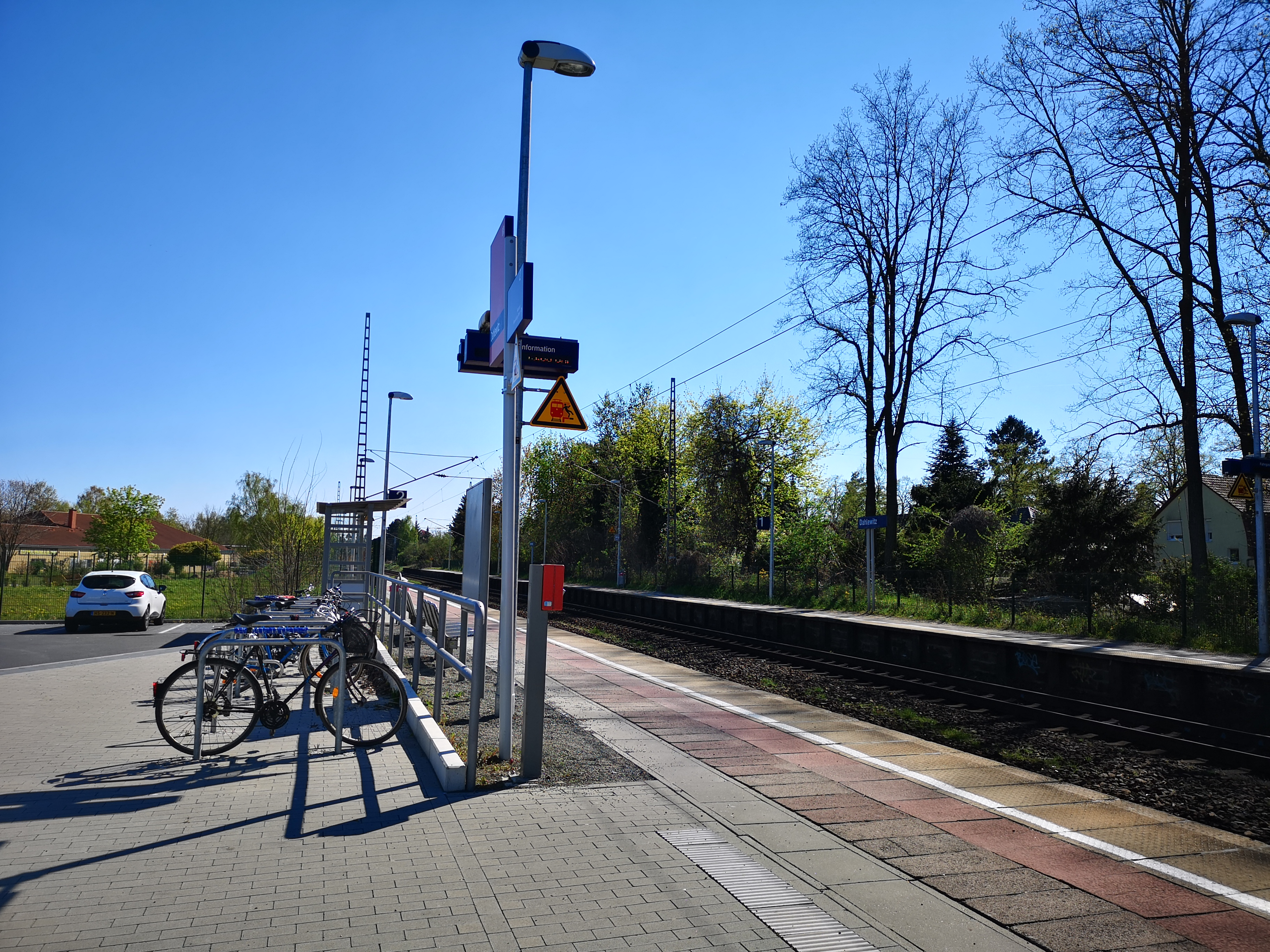
- 2019

General information
- Location: Dahlewitz, Brandenburg; Germany
- Coordinates: 52°19′35″N 13°25′11″E
- Owner: Deutsche Bahn
- Operator: DB Station&Service
- Line: Berlin–Dresden railway
- Platforms: 2
- Tracks: 2
- Connections: 713 792

Construction
- Accessible: Yes

Other information
- Station code: 1109
- DS100 code: BDT
- Category: 5
- Fare zone: : Berlin C/5955
- Website: www.bahnhof.de

History
- Opened: 7 September 1884; 141 years ago
- Closed: 12 September 1961; 64 years ago
- Electrified: 6 October 1940; 85 years ago main line: 22 May 1982; 44 years ago
- Former names: 1884-1905 Dahlwitz

Services
Preceding station	Ostdeutsche Eisenbahn	Following station
Blankenfelde towards Wismar	RE 8	Rangsdorf towards Elsterwerda
Blankenfelde towards Nauen	RB 10	Rangsdorf towards Wünsdorf-Waldstadt
Preceding station	DB Regio Nordost	Following station
Blankenfelde towards Eberswalde Hbf	RB 24	Rangsdorf towards Wünsdorf-Waldstadt
Location
- Location within Brandenburg Location within Germany Location within Europe

Dahlewitz (German: Bahnhof Dahlewitz) is a railway station in the town of Dahlewitz, Brandenburg, Germany. The station lies on the Berlin–Dresden railway and the train services are operated by Deutsche Bahn.

In the 2026 timetable the following regional services stop at the station:

Line	Route	Frequency
RE 8	Eberswalde – Bernau – Lichtenberg – Berlin Ostkreuz – Schöneweide – Dahlewitz – Blankenfelde – Wünsdorf-Waldstadt – Luckau-Uckro – Doberlug-Kirchhain – Elsterwerda	Every 2 hours
RB 10	Wünsdorf-Waldstadt – Rangsdorf – Dahlewitz – Blankenfelde – Südkreuz – Potsdamer Platz – Berlin Hbf – Spandau – Falkensee – Nauen	Hourly
RB 24	Eberswalde – Bernau – Lichtenberg – Ostkreuz – BER Airport – Blankenfelde – Wünsdorf-Waldstadt	Hourly
