= Bernau bei Berlin station =

Railway station in Bernau bei Berlin

Coordinates: 52.6755°N 13.5916°E

Bernau (b Berlin)
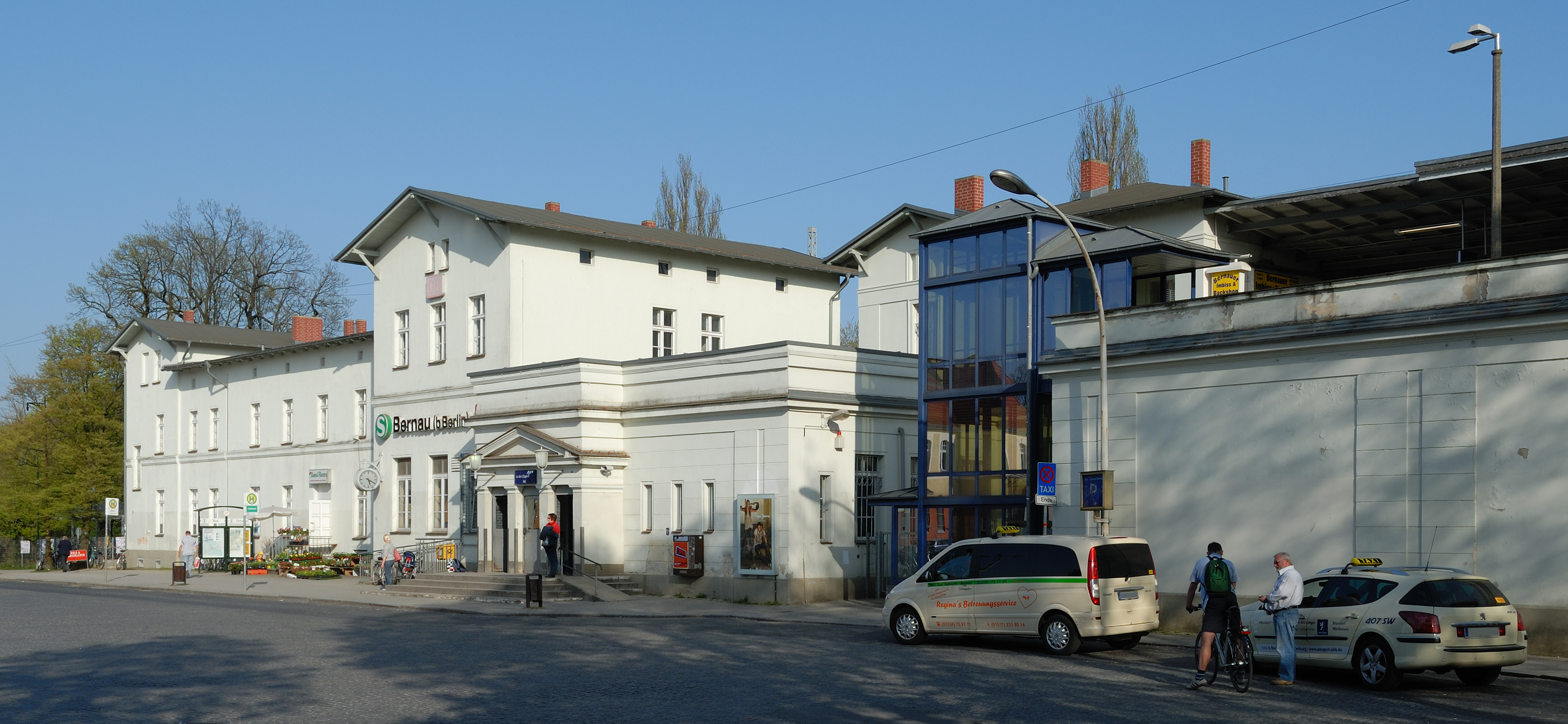

General information
- Location: Bernau bei Berlin, Brandenburg; Germany
- Owner: Deutsche Bahn
- Operator: DB Station&Service
- Lines: Berlin–Szczecin railway
- Train operators: DB Fernverkehr; DB Regio Nordost; S-Bahn Berlin
- Connections: S2 Bus interchange

Construction
- Accessible: Yes

Other information
- Station code: 0571
- DS100 code: BBRN
- Category: 3
- Fare zone: : Berlin C/5158
- Website: www.bahnhof.de

Services
Preceding station	DB Regio Nordost	Following station
Berlin Gesundbrunnen towards Jüterbog or Lutherstadt Wittenberg Hbf	RE 3	Eberswalde Hbf towards Stralsund Hbf or Schwedt
Berlin-Hohenschönhausen towards Wünsdorf-Waldstadt	RB 24	Rüdnitz towards Eberswalde Hbf
Preceding station	Niederbarnimer Eisenbahn	Following station
Berlin Gesundbrunnen Terminus	RB 60	Biesenthal towards Eberswalde Hbf
Preceding station	Berlin S-Bahn	Following station
Bernau-Friedenstal towards Blankenfelde	S2	Terminus
Location

Bernau bei Berlin (in German Bahnhof Bernau bei Berlin, simply known as Bernau) is a railway station in the city of Bernau bei Berlin, Germany. It is served by the Berlin S-Bahn, several RegionalBahn trains and numerous local bus lines.

== Train services ==
The station was served by the following services in 2026:

Line	Route		Frequency (min)
RE 3	Schwedt (Oder) –	Angermünde – Bernau – Berlin – Ludwigsfelde – Jüterbog – Lutherstadt Wittenberg	120
RE 3	Stralsund – Züssow –	Angermünde – Bernau – Berlin – Ludwigsfelde – Jüterbog – Lutherstadt Wittenberg	120
RB 24	Eberswalde – Bernau – Hohenschönhausen – Lichtenberg – Berlin Ostkreuz – Berlin-Schöneweide – BER Airport – Blankenfelde – Dahlewitz – Rangsdorf – Dabendorf – Zossen – Wünsdorf-Waldstadt		60
RB 60	Eberswalde – Bernau – Berlin Gesundbrunnen		1 train pair
S2	Bernau – Pankow – Gesundbrunnen – Nordbahnhof – Brandenburger Tor – Buckower Chaussee – Lichtenrade – Blankenfelde		20
