= Eberswalde Hauptbahnhof =

Railway station in Eberswalde, Germany

Eberswalde Hbf
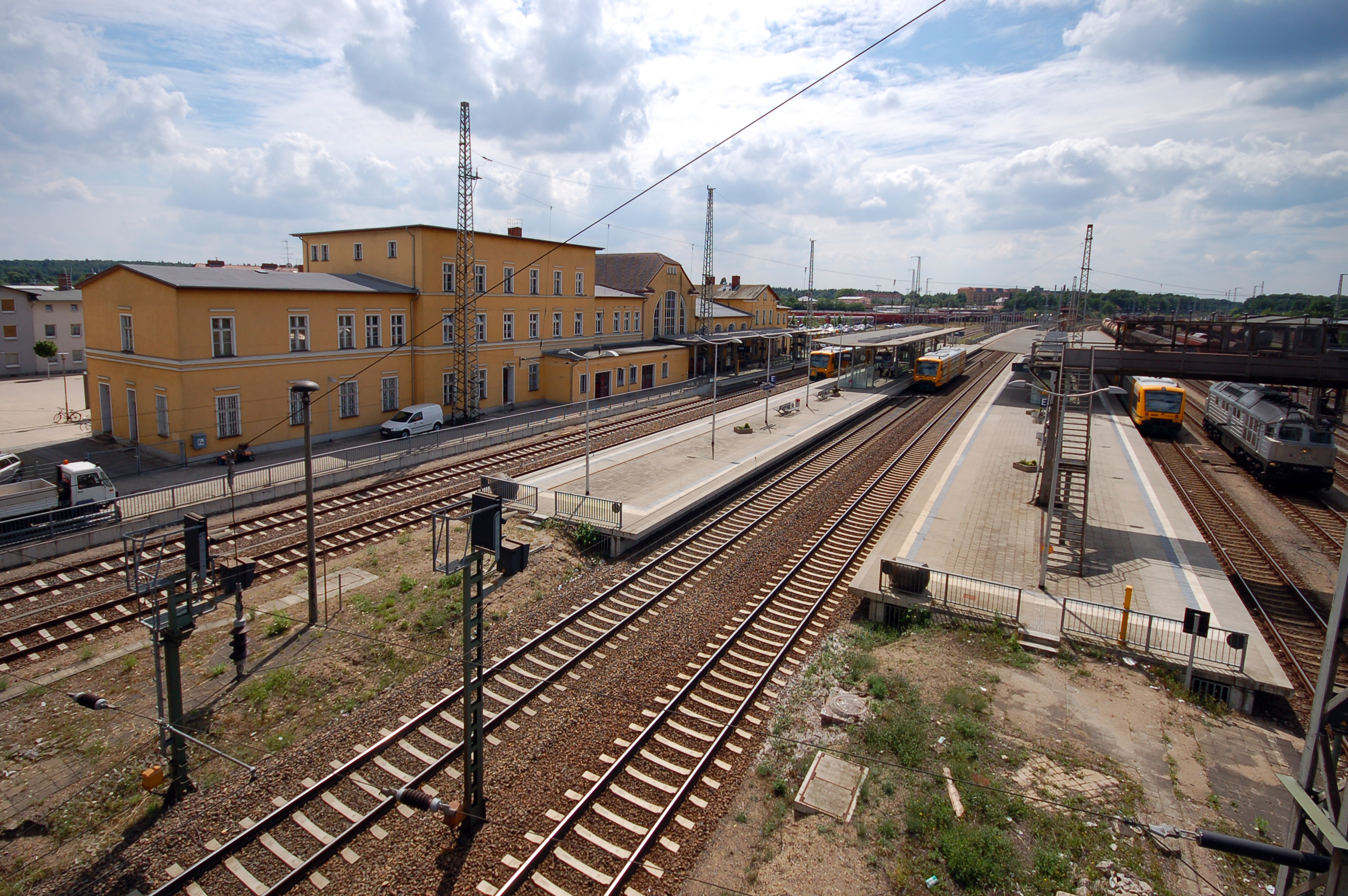
- Rear of the station (2010)

General information
- Location: Bahnhofsring 17, Eberswalde, Brandenburg; Germany
- Coordinates: 52°50′02″N 13°47′50″E
- Owner: Deutsche Bahn
- Operator: DB Station&Service
- Lines: Berlin–Szczecin; Eberswalde–Frankfurt (Oder)
- Platforms: 5

Construction
- Accessible: Yes

Other information
- Station code: 1444
- DS100 code: WE
- IBNR: 8010093
- Category: 3
- Fare zone: VBB: 4862
- Website: www.bahnhof.de

History
- Opened: 1 August 1842

Passengers
- < 5,000/day
Services
Preceding station	DB Fernverkehr	Following station
Prenzlau towards Ostseebad Binz	ICE 15	Berlin Gesundbrunnen towards Saarbrücken Hbf
Preceding station	DB Regio Nordost	Following station
Britz towards Stralsund Hbf or Schwedt	RE 3	Bernau bei Berlin towards Lutherstadt Wittenberg Hbf
Terminus	RB 24	Melchow towards Wünsdorf-Waldstadt
Preceding station	Niederbarnimer Eisenbahn	Following station
Terminus	RB 60	Niederfinow towards Frankfurt (Oder)
Terminus	RB 62	Britz towards Angermünde
Terminus	RB 63	Britz towards Joachimsthal
Location

Eberswalde Hauptbahnhof is historically the most important and now the only remaining station in the city of Eberswalde in the German state of Brandenburg. It was opened in the summer of 1842 outside the then city limits on the Berlin–Szczecin railway. The city fathers of Eberswalde did not want a modern railway in their city, so the station was built three kilometres west of the city centre in a wooded area where the Westend district is today.

== Station ==
Eberswalde was one of the first cities in Germany to be connected by rail. Seven years after the first German railway line was opened between Nuremberg and Fürth, it was then still unusual for German cities to be connected to the very new railway networks. It soon became clear that the development of the railway line was important for the supply of the city. In the following years the city grew mainly to the west towards the station, whose buildings were designed by F. Neuhaus. In 1867, a wooden bridge was built over the tracks.

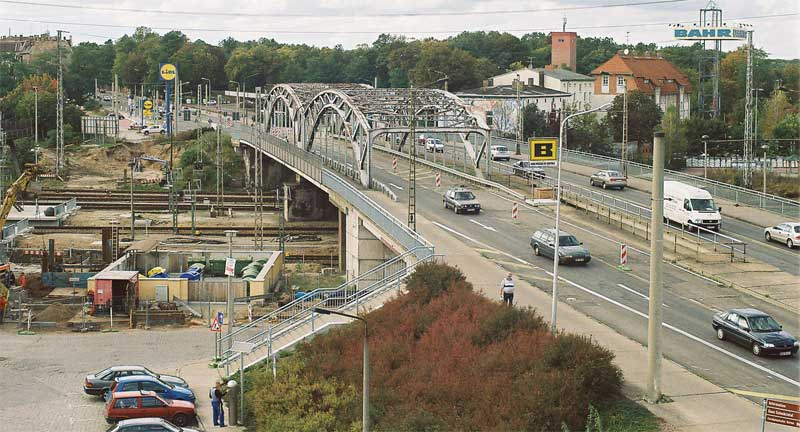
Truss bridge built in 1910 before its demolition in 2004

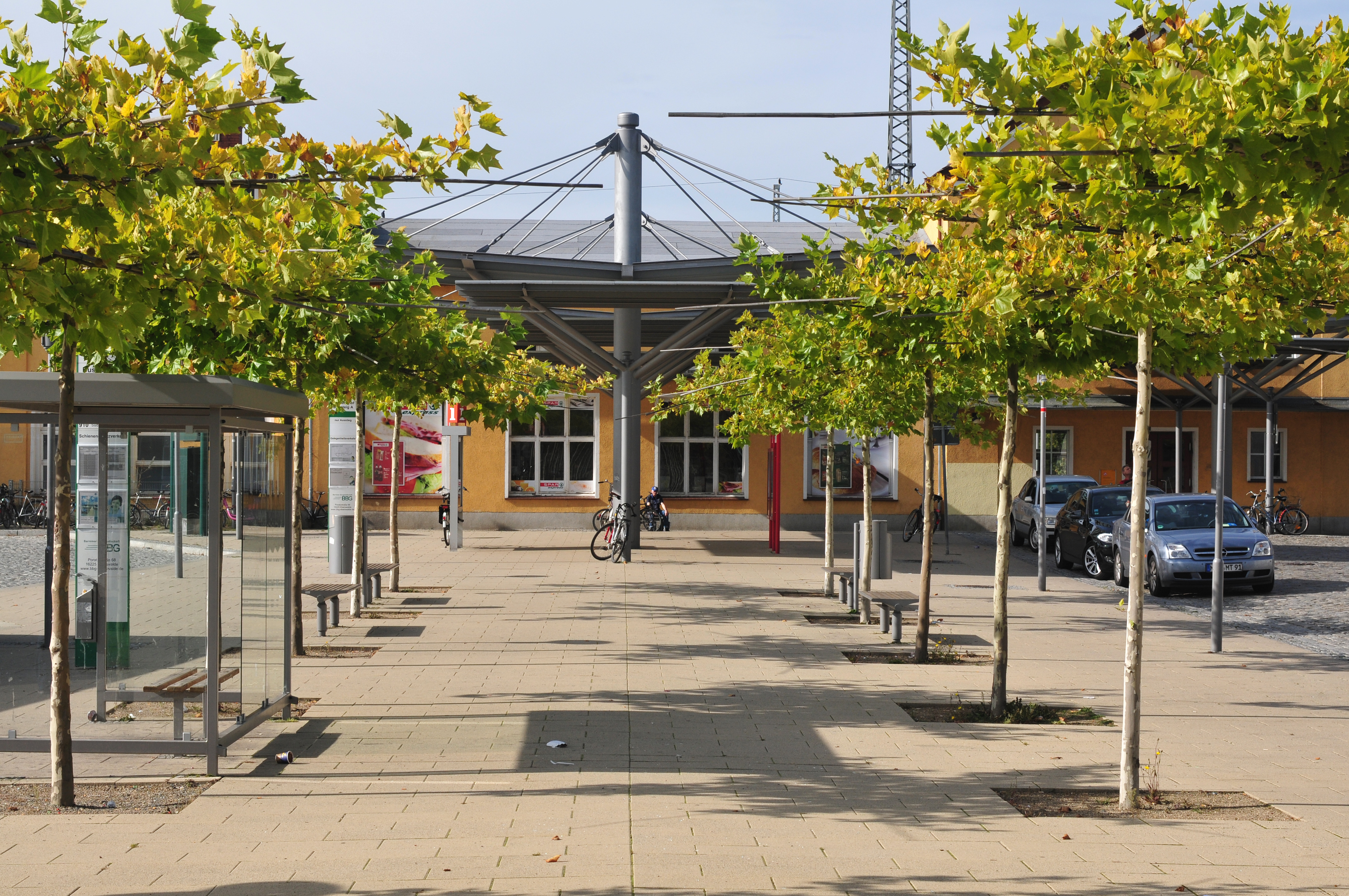
2012

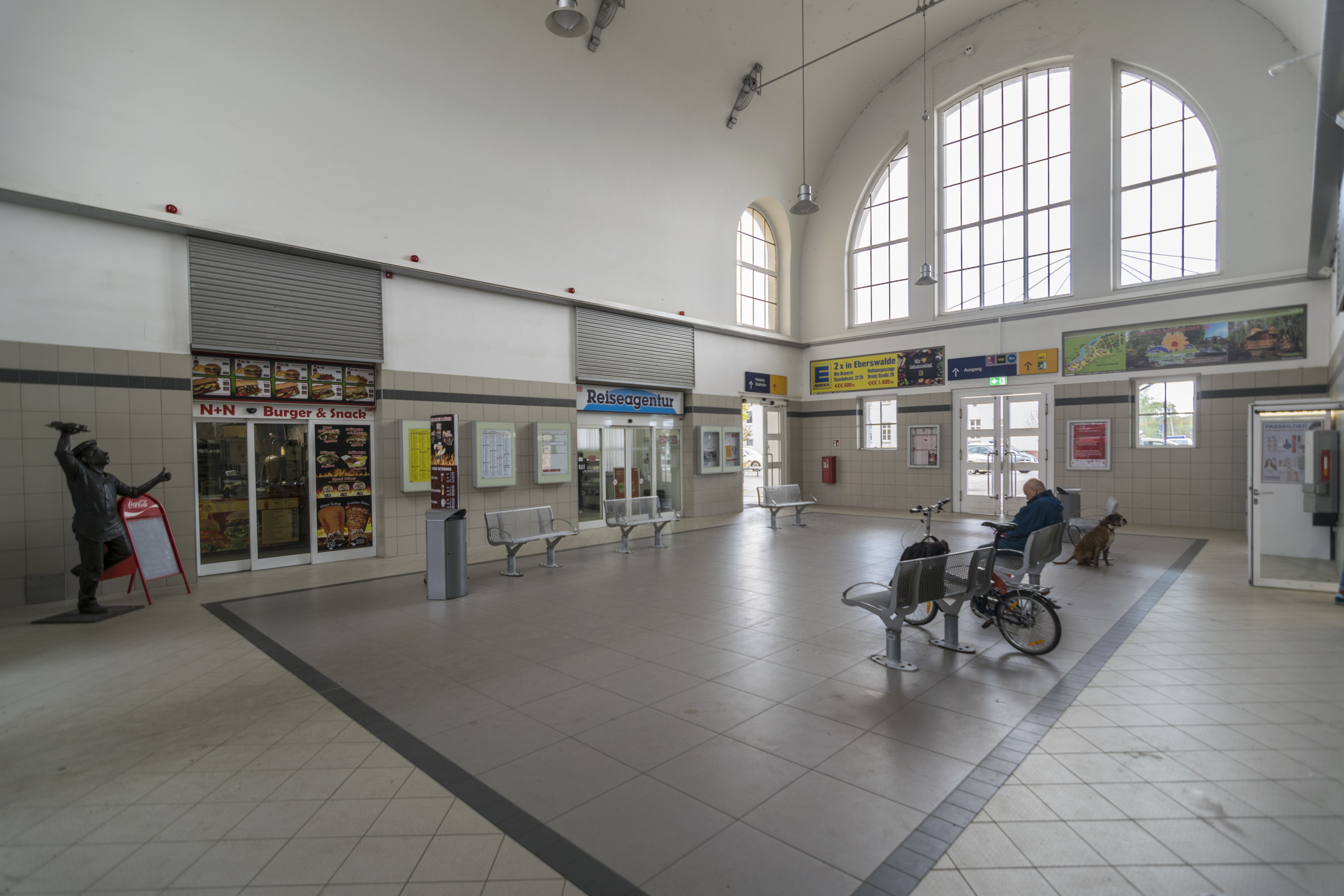
2017

On 1 May 1844 the following buildings and facilities were present at Eberswalde station:

- entrance building, including four official residences
- a two stall engine shed
- facility for supplying water and coke to locomotives
- carriage and freight sheds
- coke and salt shed
- stables
- restaurant

Eberswalde has been a junction since 1866, when a line to Wriezen was opened; it was extended to Frankfurt (Oder) in 1876/77. The station was extended between 1866 and 1867. In 1873, a roundhouse was built with eight stalls and the old two-stall engine shed was demolished. On 7 January 1878, the repair shop of the Berlin-Stettin Railway Company (German: Berlin-Stettiner Eisenbahn-Gesellschaft) (now the Deutsche Bahn maintenance depot), was opened. Near the station, a line towards Joachimsthal and Templin was opened in 1898, starting from a junction at the nearby station of Britz on the Berlin–Szczecin line. Between 1906 and 1910, the station was remodelled extensively for the first time. It received several platforms, a pedestrian tunnel, a large lobby and several restaurants. In the following decades Eberswalde was a popular destination for Berliners and the station restaurants were especially well attended.

Because of the construction of the Westend district in 1904, a railway bridge was built in 1910 to replace the old wooden bridge. A trolley bus line (Gleislose Bahn Eberswalde) operated for a few months in 1901. From 1910 to 1940 an electric tramway (Straßenbahn Eberswalde) operated from Eberswalde Marktplatz (market place) to the station forecourt. In 1940 the tramway was converted into a trolley bus line, which is now the oldest existing trolley bus line in Germany.

Until about 2004, Eberswalde Station remained largely in its 1910 state, few improvements had taken place. The station facilities were mostly in a poor condition, so a complete reconstruction was then carried out, which involved moving the tunnel to the north and the platforms to the south. The Eberswalde railway station bridge was demolished and replaced by a new structure. Only the main building of the former station is preserved. An old mechanical destination indicator, which is protected as a monument, has been returned to the platform.

== Train services ==
The station was served by the following services in 2026:

Line	Route		Frequency (min)
ICE 15	Saarbrücken – Kaiserslautern – Mannheim – Darmstadt – Frankfurt – Erfurt – Halle – Berlin – Eberswalde – Stralsund – Binz		Every two hours
RE 3	Schwedt (Oder) –	Angermünde – Eberswalde – Berlin – Ludwigsfelde – Jüterbog – Lutherstadt Wittenberg	120
RE 3	Stralsund – Züssow –	Angermünde – Eberswalde – Berlin – Ludwigsfelde – Jüterbog – Lutherstadt Wittenberg	120
RB 24	Eberswalde – Bernau – Berlin-Hohenschönhausen – Lichtenberg – Berlin Ostkreuz – Berlin-Schöneweide – BER Airport – Blankenfelde – Dahlewitz – Rangsdorf – Dabendorf – Zossen – Wünsdorf-Waldstadt		60
RB 60	(Frankfurt (Oder) – Neutrebbin–) Wriezen – Falkenberg – Eberswalde – Bernau – Berlin Gesundbrunnen		60
RB 62	Prenzlau – Angermünde (– Eberswalde)		Individual services
RB 63	Eberswalde – Britz – Golzow – Alt-Hüttendorf – Joachimsthal Kaiserbahnhof – Joachimsthal		60

== See also ==
- Rail transport in Germany
- Railway stations in Germany
