= Joachimsthal Kaiserbahnhof =

Railway station in Joachimsthal, Germany

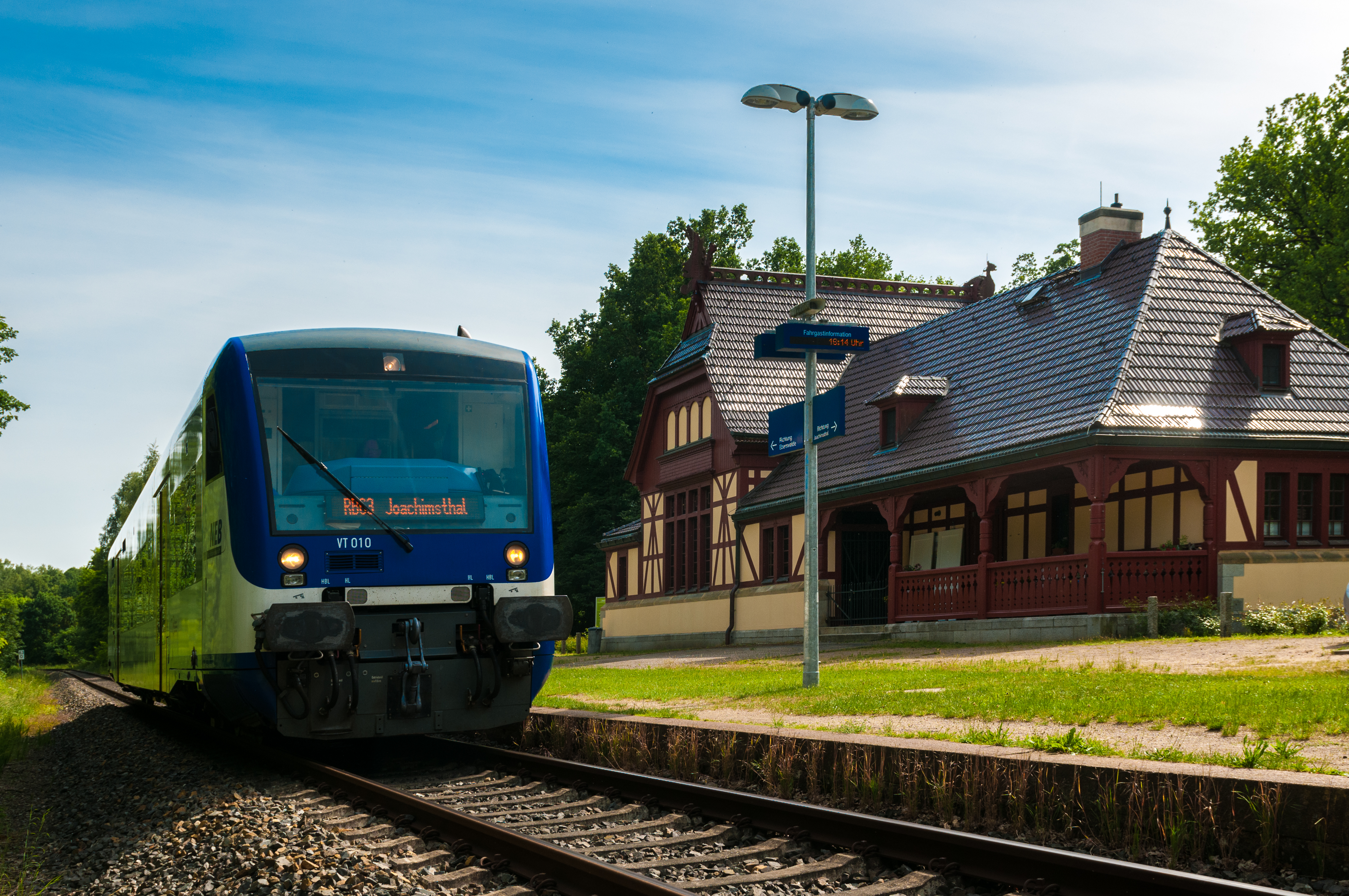
- 2017

General information
- Location: Zum Kaiserbahnhof; 16247 Joachimsthal; Brandenburg; Germany
- Coordinates: 52.9639°N 13.7548°E
- Owner: DB Netz
- Operator: DB Station&Service
- Line: Britz–Fürstenberg railway
- Platforms: 1 side platform
- Tracks: 1
- Train operators: Niederbarnimer Eisenbahn

Other information
- Station code: 6676
- DS100 code: WWLS
- IBNR: 8013279
- Category: 7
- Fare zone: VBB: 4561
- Website: www.bahnhof.de

History
- Opened: 5 December 1898; 127 years ago

Services
Preceding station	Niederbarnimer Eisenbahn	Following station
Joachimsthal towards Templin Stadt	RB 63	Alt Hüttendorf towards Eberswalde Hbf
Location
- Location within Brandenburg Location within Germany Location within Europe

Joachimsthal Kaiserbahnhof is a railway station in the municipality of Joachimsthal, located in the Barnim district in Brandenburg, Germany.
