= Joachimsthal station =

Railway station in Germany

Joachimsthal
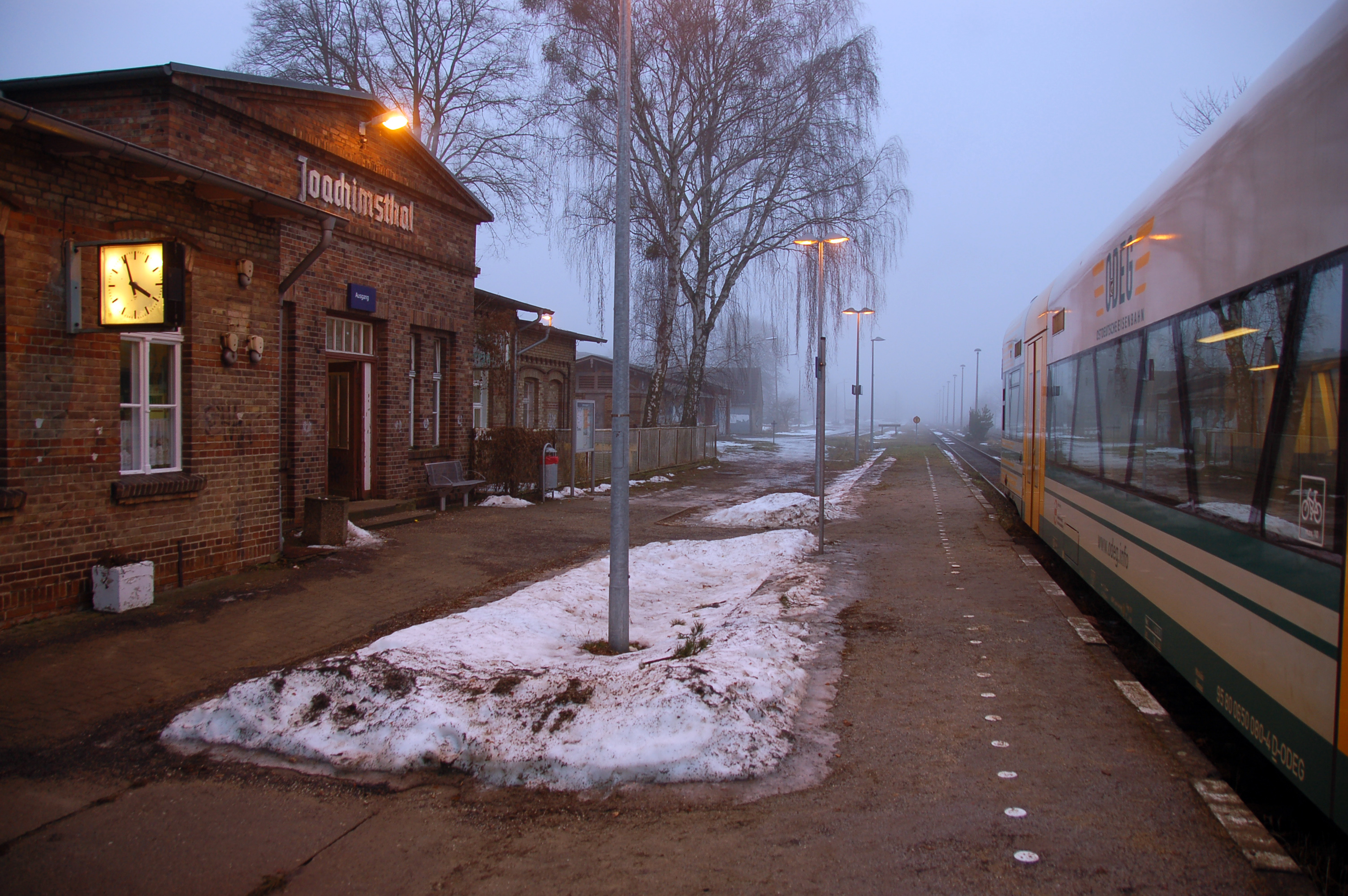
- 2011

General information
- Location: Bahnhofstraße 3; 16247 Joachimsthal; Brandenburg; Germany
- Coordinates: 52.9802°N 13.7495°E
- Owner: DB Netz
- Operator: DB Station&Service
- Line: Britz–Fürstenberg railway
- Platforms: 1 side platform
- Tracks: 2
- Train operators: Niederbarnimer Eisenbahn

Other information
- Station code: 3055
- DS100 code: WJT
- IBNR: 8011962
- Category: 6
- Fare zone: VBB: 4561
- Website: www.bahnhof.de

Services
Preceding station	Niederbarnimer Eisenbahn	Following station
Friedrichswalde towards Templin Stadt	RB 63	Joachimsthal Kaiserbahnhof towards Eberswalde Hbf
Location
- Location within Brandenburg

Joachimsthal station is a railway station in the municipality of Joachimsthal, located in the Barnim district in Brandenburg, Germany.
