= Blankenfelde station =

Railway station in Blankenfelde-Mahlow, Germany

Blankenfelde (Kr Teltow-Fläming)
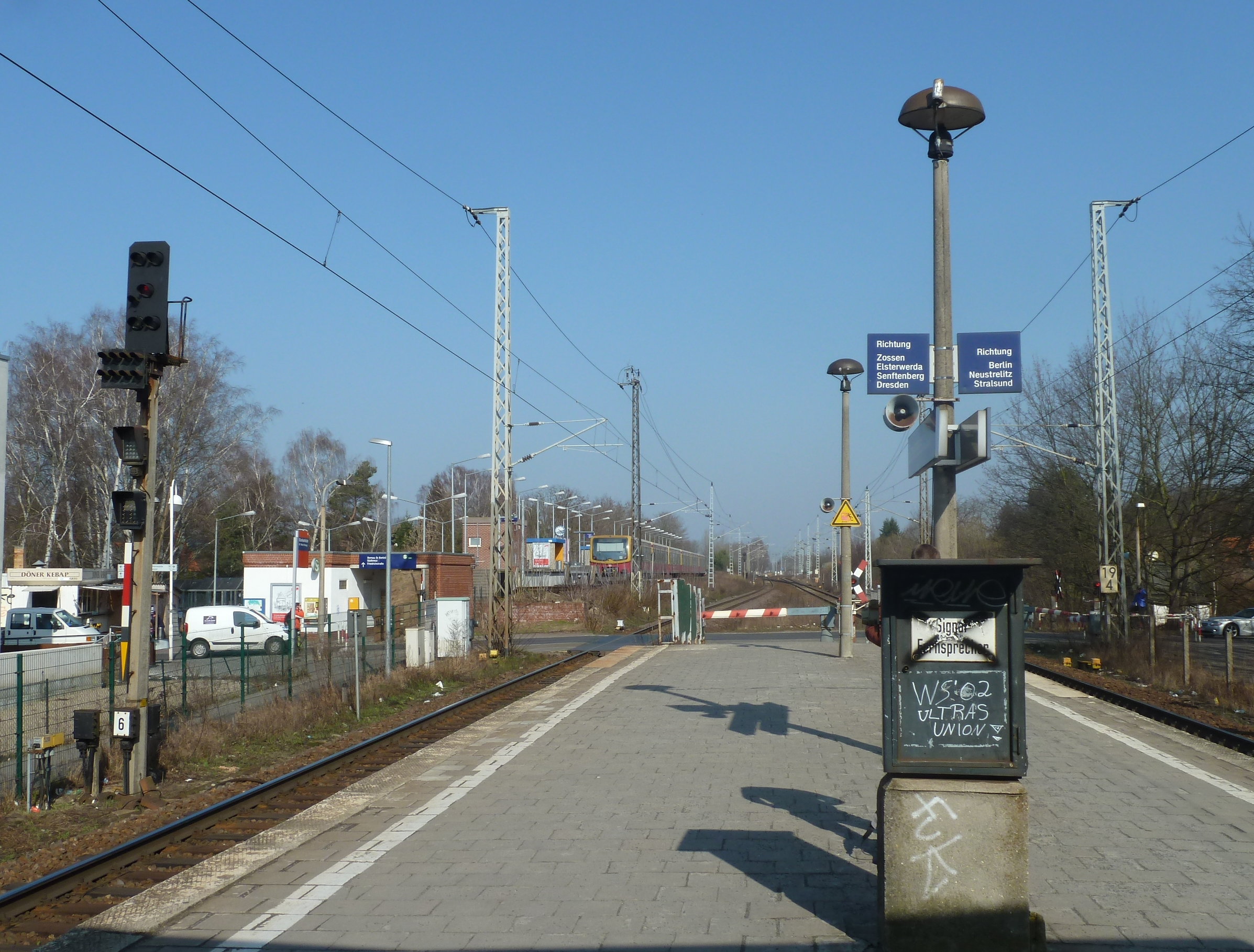
- Regional platform in Blankenfelde, S-Bahn terminus in the background.

General information
- Location: Mahlow, Blankenfelde-Mahlow, Brandenburg; Germany
- Coordinates: 52°20′15″N 13°24′57″E
- Owner: Deutsche Bahn
- Operator: DB Netz; DB Station&Service
- Line: Berlin–Dresden railway (km 19.4)
- Platforms: 2 (long distance); 1 (S-Bahn)
- Tracks: 3
- Train operators: DB Regio Nordost; S-Bahn Berlin
- Connections: S2

Construction
- Accessible: Yes

Other information
- Station code: 688
- DS100 code: BBF (long distance); BBFD (S-Bahn)
- IBNR: 8010053
- Category: 4
- Fare zone: : Berlin C/5955
- Website: www.bahnhof.de

History
- Opened: 8 October 1950; 75 years ago
- Electrified: at opening, 750 V DC system (3rd rail) main line: 23 May 1982; 44 years ago, 15 kV AC system (overhead)
- Former names: 1950-1953 Blankenfelde (Kr Teltow); 1953-1996 Blankenfelde (Kr Zossen)

Key dates
- 1961 September - 1992 August 30: operation interrupted

Services
| Preceding station | Ostdeutsche Eisenbahn | Following station |
|---|---|---|
| Berlin-Lichterfelde Ost towards Wismar | RE 8 | Dahlewitz towards Elsterwerda |
| Berlin Südkreuz towards Nauen | RB 10 | Dahlewitz towards Wünsdorf-Waldstadt |
| Preceding station | DB Regio Nordost | Following station |
| BER Airport towards Eberswalde Hbf | RB 24 | Dahlewitz towards Wünsdorf-Waldstadt |
| Preceding station | Berlin S-Bahn | Following station |
| Mahlow towards Bernau | S2 | Terminus |
Location

Blankenfelde station is on the Berlin–Dresden railway in the locality of Blankenfelde in the municipality of Blankenfelde-Mahlow in the district of Teltow-Fläming in the German state of Brandenburg. The station consists of two sections that are structurally separate from each other. One section is located just south of the Karl-Marx-Straße level crossing and consists of an island platform for regional and long-distance services. The other section lies north of Karl-Marx-Straße and is the southern terminus of Berlin S-Bahn line S2. On the official S-Bahn maps its name is styled Blankenfelde (Kr. Teltow-Fläming) to avoid possible confusion with Blankenfelde locality in the Pankow district in northern Berlin.

== Location and infrastructure ==
The station is situated in the locality of Blankenfelde at kilometre 19.4 of the Berlin–Dresden railway. Curves connect the long-distance tracks to the northern branch of Glasower Damm Süd junction on the Berlin Outer Ring (Berliner Außenring, BAR). A long-distance track and the single track of the S-Bahn cross over the Outer Ring towards Berlin; both tracks merge before Mahlow station.

The long-distance platform is 229-meter long and 76 centimetres high and is covered for a length of about 30 metres. The S-Bahn platform is 180 metre long and 96 centimetres high and has one platform edge. The S-Bahn tracks are three metres above the level of the long-distance tracks. The long-distance platform has a pedestrian tunnel with exits on both sides of the tracks as well as a ground level access to the Karl-Marx-Straße level crossing. The S-Bahn platform can be accessed via stairs and a ramp.

== History ==
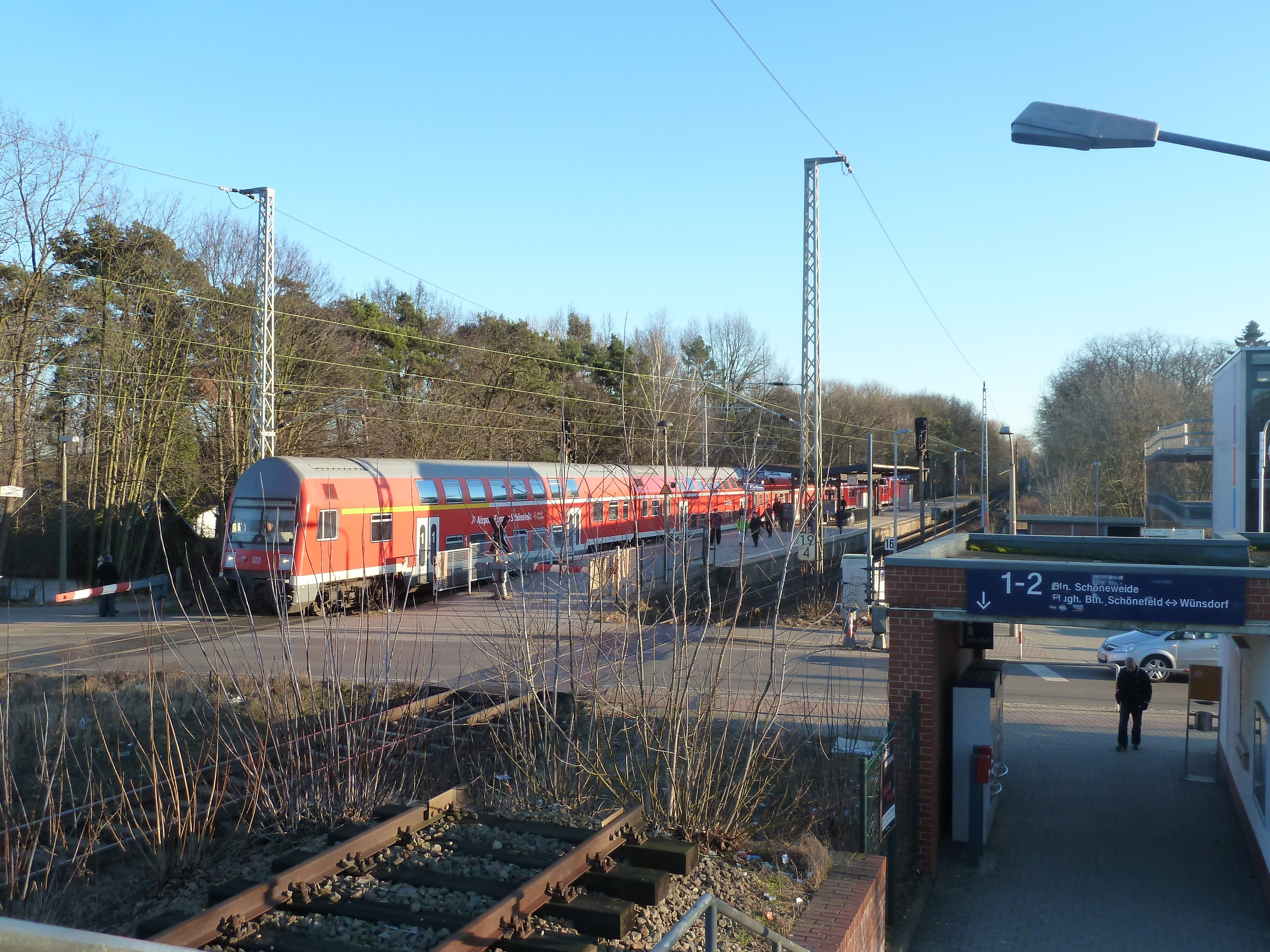
View from the S-Bahn platform over the level crossing to the platform for regional services

The station was built as part of a Subbotnik by the people of Blankenfelde and was opened on 8 October 1950 with the name of Blankenfelde (Kr Teltow)—Kr standing for Kreis (district). This was in response to the imminent closure of the Anhalter Bahnhof in Berlin and the associated diversion of long-distance trains over the Berlin Outer Ring to East Berlin. Blankenfelde station was established as a transfer point to provide a connection between West Berlin and long-distance services on the railway to Dresden. Although the second track of the Dresden Railways had been removed for reparations to the Soviet Union, an island platform was built in preparation for the second track to be restored.

The S-Bahn continued over the line to Rangsdorf, which was also shared with the mainline, resulting in a timetable that was often affected by operational failures on the single-track line. Therefore, the second track was restored in 1952. Instead of operating as a two-track mixed operation, long-distance and S-Bahn services were operationally separated, that is it was operated as two parallel single-track lines. The following year, the station was renamed Blankenfelde (Kr Zossen) due to changes in district boundaries.

The construction of the Berlin Wall in August 1961 cut the S-Bahn line north of Mahlow. A shuttle service was operated south to Rangsdorf, but it was closed in September 1961. Instead an existing service between Rangsdorf and Wünsdorf was extended to Mahlow, but it was diverted to run over the Outer Ring to Schönefeld in May 1963. In order to maintain a connection to Mahlow, a separate platform was built at Blankenfelde and the short section was served by a shuttle service. This was operated during the first years by a train that included a diesel locomotive of class V 15 and a control car. The train was nicknamed the Blauer Bock (blue billy goat), because of the blue paint applied to the locomotive and the name of a contemporary radio entertainment program. Because there was no space available to the west the existing platform and the connecting curves to the outer ring were grade-separated, the platform for the " Blauer Bock" had to be built as an extension of the long-distance platform.

After the reunification of Germany, it was decided to reconnect the West Berlin S-Bahn network with the surrounding area. Since the Dresden Railway had been electrified with the overhead system in 1985, the restoration of the S-Bahn to Rangsdorf would have required a completely new section of track to be built. Therefore, the initial restoration of S-Bahn services has been limited to the route to Blankenfelde, where it is now necessary to change to regional services. The Blauer Bock was abandoned on 16 September 1991 and electrical services were restored on the rebuilt section. The side platform was dismantled and rebuilt on the current site of the S-Bahn station. The option of building a new platform next to the long-distance platform–on the same level or on an embankment—was not chosen, because, on the one hand, it would have required a steep gradient north of the platform and, on the other hand, the tight schedule for the opening would have been difficult to meet. The S-Bahn service from Blankenfelde to Mahlow via Lichtenrade and on to Bernau resumed on 31 August 1992. The station was given its current name on 2 June 1996.

== Train services ==
Until the late 1950s, the only passenger services at Blankenfelde were provided by the Berlin S-Bahn. A few suburban services was also provided on the long-distance tracks in order to bypass West Berlin. In 1960, three trains towards Berlin and four trains coming from Berlin stopped in Blankenfelde; the S-Bahn ticket could be used on the long-distance trains. After the construction of the Wall, the only remaining services ran towards Berlin via Berlin Schönefeld Flughafen station. Double-deck trains between Berlin Schönefeld stopped in Blankenfelde approximately every hour, some running between Berlin-Schöneweide and Wünsdorf; a connecting train shuttled between Blankenfelde and Mahlow.

After the fall of the Wall and the re-commissioning of the S-Bahn to Blankenfelde, regional transport continued to use the route via Schönefeld and the trains ran about twice an hour to Berlin. Trains on the service from Potsdam to Wünsdorf also stopped in Blankenfelde in the 1990s, but this service was abandoned after a few years. There were calls for Blankenfelde to be a stop for InterRegio trains then operated by Deutsche Bahn, but these were not successful. Since the opening of the North-South mainline in Berlin in 2006, trains to Berlin run alternately on the new route or via Schönefeld to the Berlin Stadtbahn.

The station is served by S-Bahn line S2 operated at 20-minute intervals and the RE 8 and RB 10 and RB 24 regional services.

In the 2026 timetable the following regional services stop at the station:

| Line | Route | Frequency |
|---|---|---|
| RE 8 | Eberswalde – Bernau – Lichtenberg – Berlin Ostkreuz – Schöneweide – Blankenfelde – Wünsdorf-Waldstadt – Luckau-Uckro – Doberlug-Kirchhain – Elsterwerda | Every 2 hours |
| RB 10 | Wünsdorf-Waldstadt – Rangsdorf – Dahlewitz – Blankenfelde – Südkreuz – Potsdamer Platz – Berlin Hbf – Spandau – Falkensee – Nauen | Hourly |
| RB 24 | Eberswalde – Bernau – Lichtenberg – Ostkreuz – BER Airport – Blankenfelde – Wünsdorf-Waldstadt | Hourly |

There are interchanges with the buses operated by the Verkehrsgesellschaft Teltow-Fläming (the municipal bus company of Teltow-Fläming).

== See also ==
- List of railway stations in Berlin
- List of railway stations in Brandenburg
