= Luckau-Uckro station =

Railway station in Luckau, Germany

Luckau-Uckro
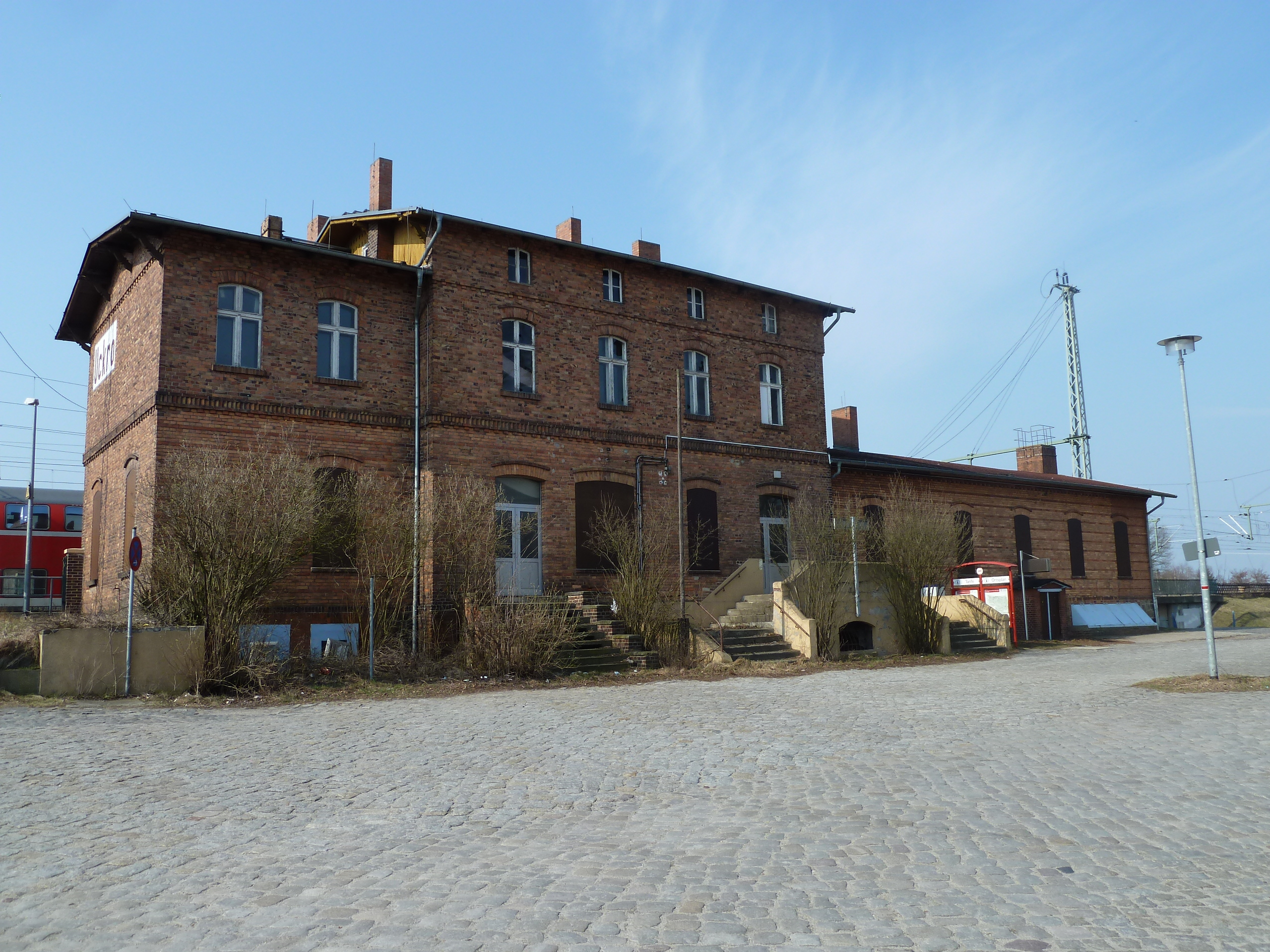
- Station building of the Berlin–Dresden railway with station forecourt, 2012

General information
- Location: Uckro, Luckau, Brandenburg; Germany
- Coordinates: 51°51′07″N 13°36′28″E
- Lines: Berlin–Dresden railway; Lower Lusatian Railway (NLE); Dahme–Uckro railway (DUE) (closed)
- Platforms: 2 (Berlin–Dresden); 2 (NLE, disused); 1 (DUE, closed)
- Tracks: 5

Construction
- Accessible: Yes

Other information
- Station code: 6305
- DS100 code: BUK
- IBNR: 8010353
- Category: 6
- Fare zone: VBB: 7059
- Website: www.bahnhof.de

History
- Opened: 17 June 1875
- Former names: Uckro-Luckau (1875–); Uckro (–1996)

Passengers
- 200 per day

Services
Preceding station	Ostdeutsche Eisenbahn	Following station
Drahnsdorf towards Wismar	RE 8	Walddrehna towards Elsterwerda
Location
- Location within Brandenburg

Luckau-Uckro (called Uckro until 1996 and Uckro-Luckau in its early years) station is in the locality of Uckro in the city of Luckau in the south of the German state of Brandenburg. It lies on the Berlin–Dresden railway and was formerly a railway as it was also served by the Dahme–Uckro railway and the Lower Lusatian Railway. All three railway lines had their own station buildings. These have been preserved and all three buildings are heritage-listed.

== Location ==
The station is located at kilometre 76.0 (measured from Berlin) of the Berlin–Dresden railway to the west of the centre of Uckro, a hamlet that is in the territory of the town of Luckau in the Brandenburg district of Dahme-Spreewald. The railway line runs approximately north–south through the station. The actual town of Luckau is about eight kilometres away to the east and the town of Dahme/Mark is located about 13 kilometres to the west. It lies to the east at the foot of the Lower Lusatian Ridge at the beginning of the Lusatian Border Ridge, a smaller range of hills, which the railway line crosses to the south.

== History ==
The original plans of the Berlin-Dresden railway had provided for a route through the town of Dahme, but this failed because of the resistance of the local mayor. The same is said of a route via Luckau. So the line was built on the current route at a higher cost because of the ridges around Uckro. The station in the village Uckro was opened along with the line on 17 June 1875. In its first years of operation, it was called Uckro-Luckau due to its proximity to Luckau. There were stagecoach connections from Uckro to Luckau and Dahme.

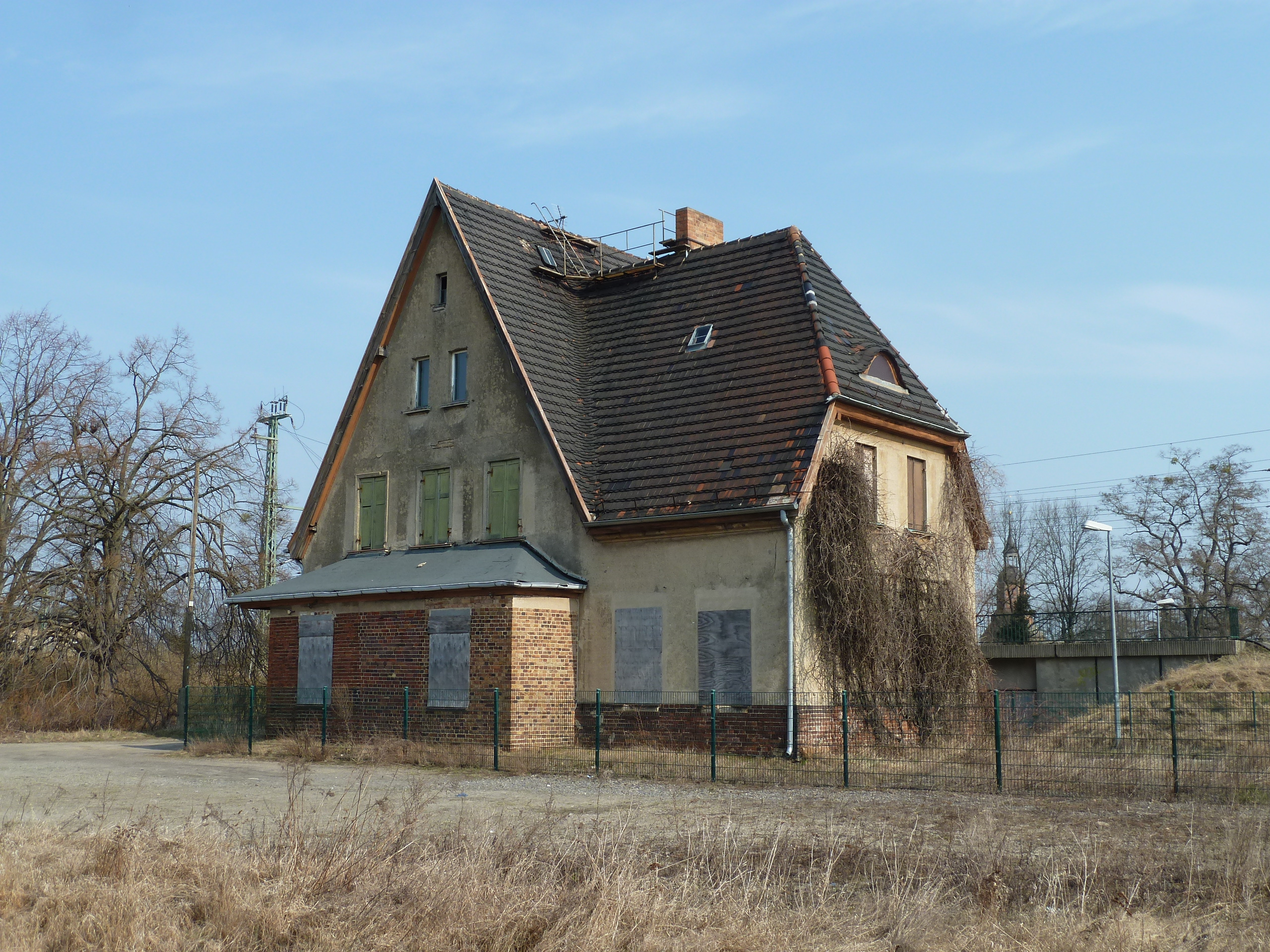
Station building of the Dahme-Uckro railway, behind are the tracks of the state railway

In the following years there were further plans to connect Dahme to the railway. A larger standard gauge network was planned, but after all the investigations were completed, the only route approved was the Dahme–Uckro–Luckau route. After the town of Luckau decided not to take part, the Dahme-Uckroer-Eisenbahn AG (Dahme-Uckro Railway, DUE) was founded on 21 October 1884.The 12.6 km long section from Uckro to Dahme went into operation on 31 July 1886.

In the 1890s planning began on the building of a railway line from Falkenberg via Uckro, Luckau to Lübben. The Lower Lusatian Railway (Niederlausitzer Eisenbahn, NLE) went into operation between Luckau and Uckro on 20 December 1897. The extension to Falkenberg and the section between Lübben and Luckau followed on 15 March 1898. This line crossed the main line several kilometres south of Uckro, but the company built its own station close to the eastern edge of the state railway's station building.

After the Second World War both private railways were acquired by Deutsche Reichsbahn. In October 1953, Uckro station was the starting point of one of the largest pursuit ever carried out by East Germany's Volkspolizei (“People's Police”), when five young men from Czechoslovakia, the Mašín brothers and three of their friends, who are still referred to as either anti-Communist martyrs or as criminals, came here as they attempted to reach West Berlin. As a result, two police commissioners were killed whilst one fugitive seceded from the group and was subsequently apprehended.

With the beginning of the division of Berlin and Germany in the late 1940s, the importance of Uckro station grew. Since the Dresden Railway ran to West Berlin, trains changed from the main line to the tracks of the Lower Lusatian Railway in Uckro to reach the eastern part of Berlin via Lubben. From 1952 the Dresden Railway was connected to East Berlin via the Berlin Outer Ring (Berliner Außenring). Nevertheless, it was often necessary for trains to change between the Dresden Railway and Lower Lusatian Railway in Uckro due to rail construction, heavy freight traffic or for military reasons during the time of East Germany.

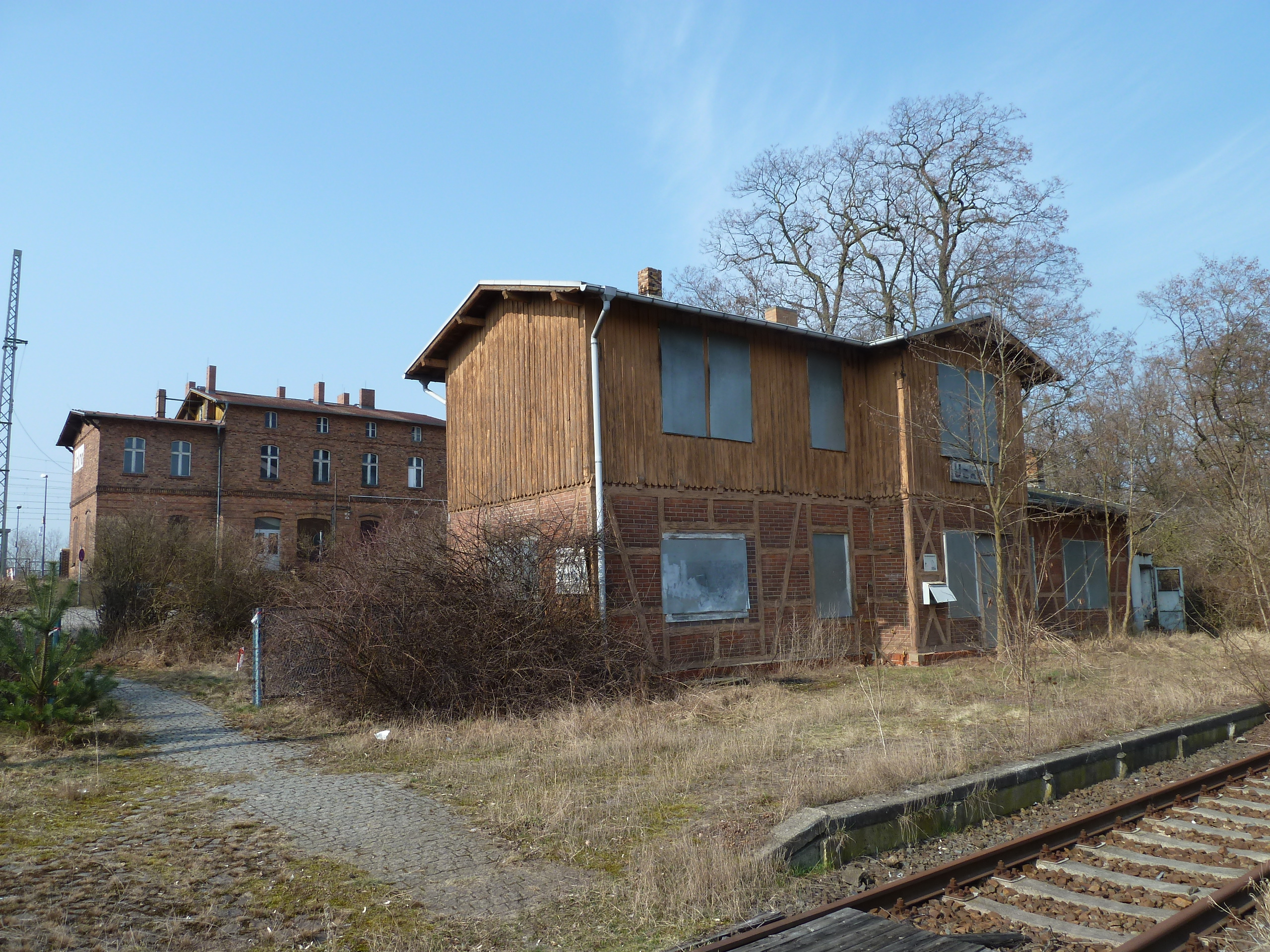
The tracks of the Lower Lusatian Railway are currently out of service

On 27 September 1981, the mainline tracks in Uckro station were electrified from the south. The section to Rangsdorf followed shortly later and electrification was extended to Berlin in 1983/84. Passenger traffic towards Dahme was abandoned on 3 January 1968. Freight operations continued there until the early 1990s, but the line was closed in 1993.

The importance of the Lower Lusatian Railway fell after the German reunification. Freight traffic had fallen significantly, there were no longer military reasons for bypass routes and there was growing competition from cars in passenger transport. The section between Uckro and Luckau was abandoned in February 1995 because of the poor condition of the track and it no longer used by regular passenger services. Passenger traffic between Uckro and Herzberg (Elster) ended on 27 May 1995. A year later, on 1 June 1996, passenger services ended between Luckau and Lübben and as a result the town of Luckau lost its passenger services. About the same time Uckro station was renamed Luckau-Uckro. The village of Uckro was not incorporated in the town of Luckau until 2002.

In 1998, Deutsche Regionaleisenbahn took over the line of the Lower Lusatian Railway. It operated occasional seasonal freight traffic until 2008. Since then, the line and the corresponding part of Uckro station has been disused, but it has not been formally closed.

The station forecourt was rebuilt up to 2013. This involved the building of a new bus station, 55 parking bays and a covered bicycle facility at a cost of €580,000. The redesigned station forecourt was opened in Easter 2013.

== Passenger services ==
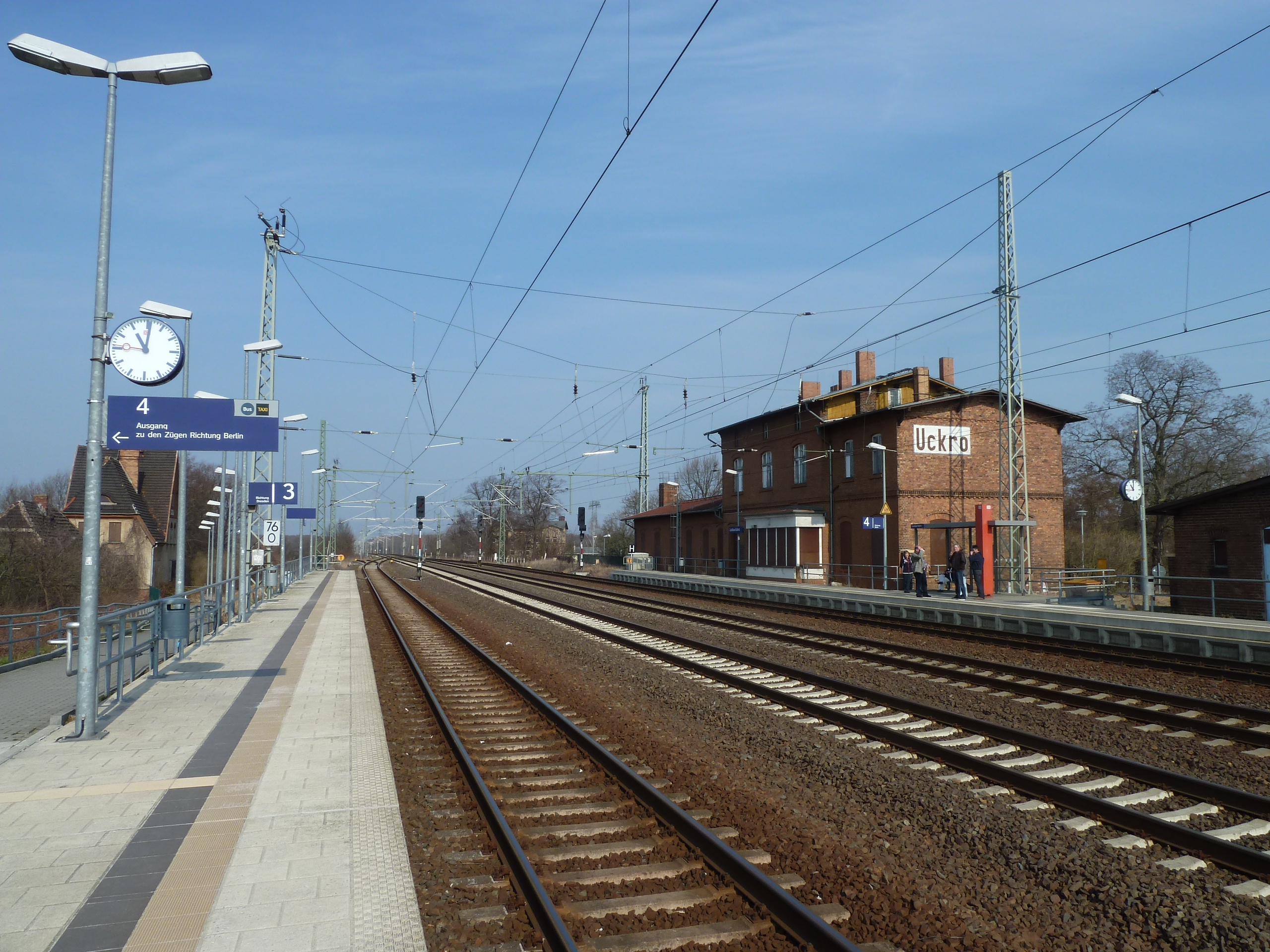
Platforms of the main line. The building of the DUE are behind to the left and the tracks of the NLE are to the right out of shot.

Since the separation of express and stopping passenger services in the late 19th century, Uckro has been mostly served by stopping trains; express (Schnellzug ) and semi-fast (Eilzug) trains have rarely stopped there. On the main line, four daily stopping trains and a semi-fast train stopped in 1939 and there were two stopping trains and a semi-fast on weekends. An express train running to the south from Berlin to Chemnitz also stopped at the station. On the NLE, three pairs of trains ran towards Falkenberg and eight towards Luckau. On the line to Dahme, four passenger trains and three buses were operated by the railway company. After the Second World War the level of services was similar. In 1960, four pairs of trains on the main line stopped in Uckro, but express trains did not stop there. On the NLE, the level of services was identical to that in 1939, with six pairs running to Dahme (five pairs on Sundays). With the exception of thinning out of services to Dahme and their subsequent abandonment, the level of services remained similar until the 1990s.

== Infrastructure ==
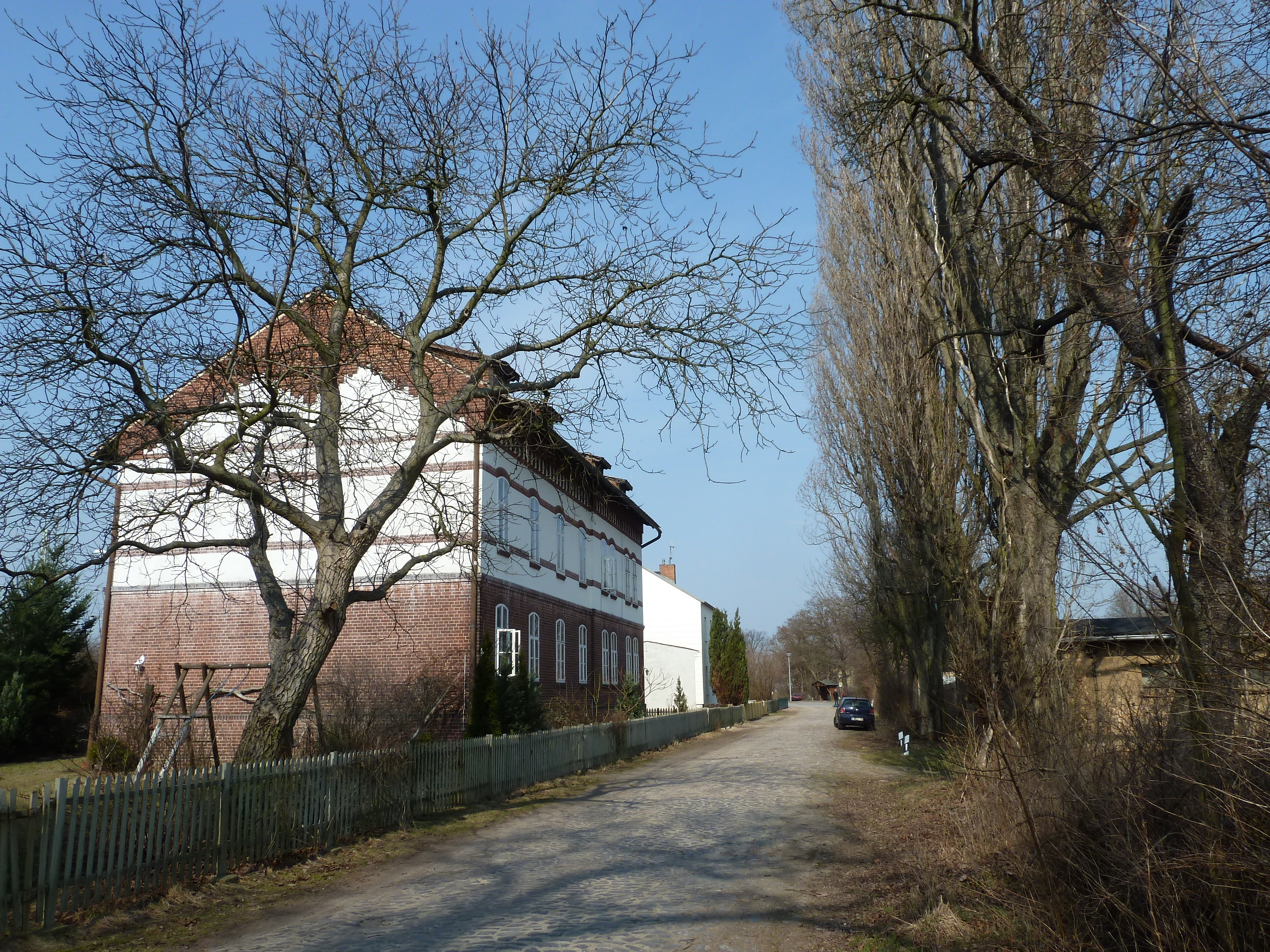
Listed railway workers' residence

The station complex consists of three independent juxtaposed stations. While they were generally all called Uckro in the public timetables, the in-house names of the stations of the DUE and the NLE were Uckro West and Uckro Süd (south). The installations of the Berlin-Dresden railway are somewhat above the level of the surrounding terrain. The tracks consist of two through tracks and two outside platform tracks with outside platforms. A station tunnel connects the two platforms. The station building is located east of the tracks and connects to a paved station forecourt. On the other side of the forecourt is the station building of the Lower Lusatian Railway and its tracks lay behind station building. The installations of the Dahme-Uckro Railway were on the other side of the main line. Its tracks have been dismantled. The whole "Uckro station complex", consisting of the "station building of the Berlin-Dresden railway, including of the station forecourt, the station building of Lower Lusatian Railway and the station building of the Dahme–Uckro railway, including its toilet block" are a heritage-listed site. The complex also includes a "residential house for railway staff with a stable building" to the south of the station forecourt.

The track layouts of the two private railways were relatively less extensive, since the centres of operations of both companies was not in Uckro but in Dahme and Luckau. The DUE had only two tracks at the station building, while the NLE had five tracks with a loading track. South of the tracks of the passenger operations are the connecting tracks from the main line to the branch lines and the former freight sidings of the main line.

== Train services ==
The station is served by the following services:

Line	Route	Frequency (min)	Operator
RE 8	Berlin Hbf – Berlin Südkreuz – Blankenfelde – Zossen – Klasdorf Glashütte – Luckau-Uckro – Doberlug-Kirchhain – Elsterwerda	120	Ostdeutsche Eisenbahn
As of: 14 December 2026

== See also ==
- List of railway stations in Brandenburg
