= Elsterwerda station =

Railway station in Elsterwerda, Germany

Elsterwerda
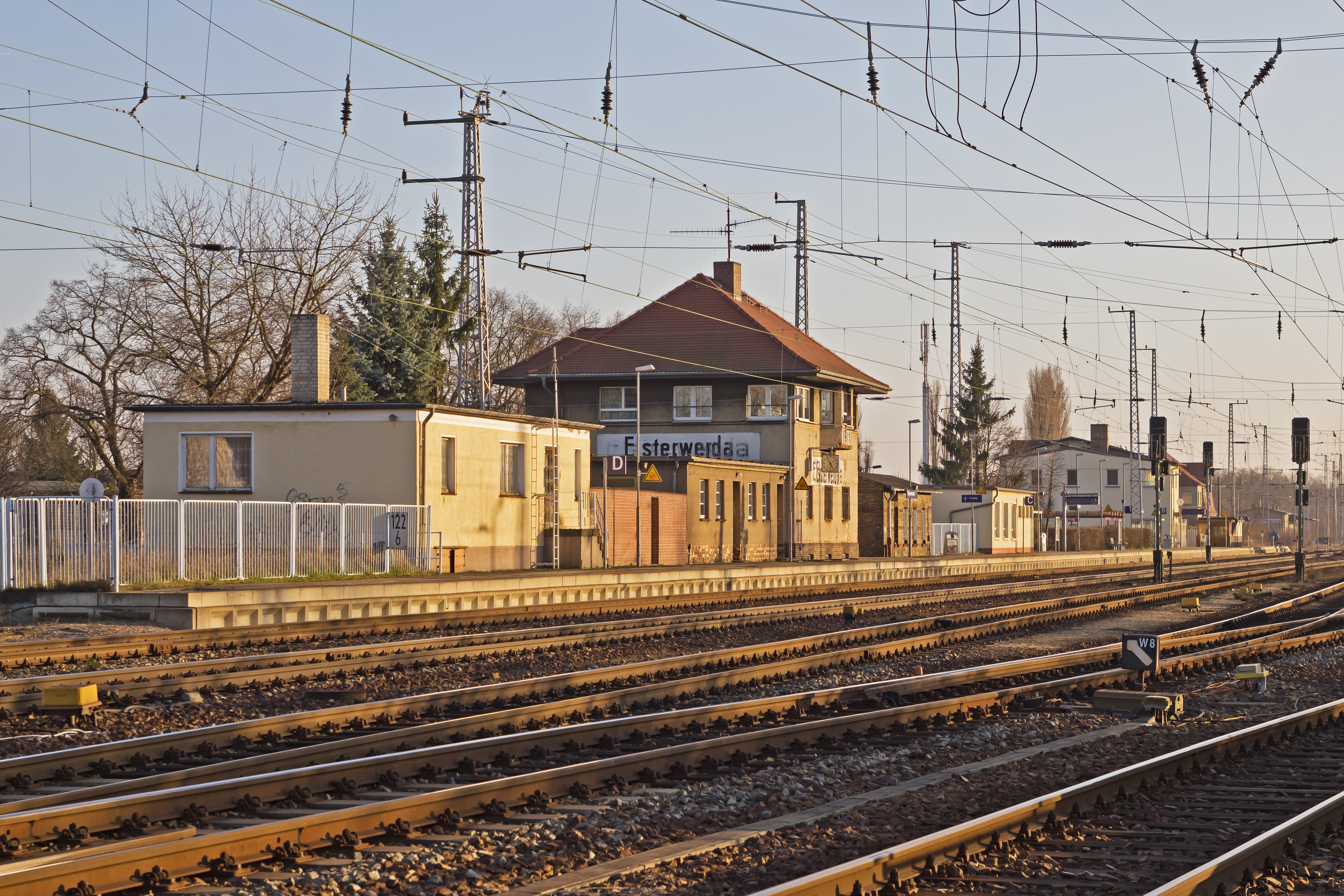
- Exterior view of the station

General information
- Location: Am Bahnhof 1, Elsterwerda, Brandenburg; Germany
- Coordinates: 51°27′37″N 13°30′59″E
- Owner: Deutsche Bahn
- Operator: DB Netz; DB Station&Service
- Lines: Berlin–Dresden railway; Riesa–Elsterwerda (KBS 520); connecting curve to Elsterwerda-Biehla (KBS 225)
- Platforms: 3
- Tracks: 7

Construction
- Accessible: Yes

Other information
- Station code: 1569
- DS100 code: BEW
- IBNR: 8010099
- Category: 4
- Fare zone: : 7858
- Website: www.bahnhof.de

History
- Opened: 17 June 1875

Passengers
- < 2,500/day
Services
| Preceding station | DB Fernverkehr | Following station |
|---|---|---|
| BER Airport towards Rostock Hbf | IC 17 | Dresden-Neustadt towards Chemnitz Hbf |
| Preceding station | | Following station |
| Schönefeld towards Aachen Hbf | FLX 30 | Dresden-Neustadt towards Dresden Hbf |
| Preceding station | DB Regio Nordost | Following station |
| Elsterwerda-Biehla towards Cottbus Hbf | RE 13 | Terminus |
| Elsterwerda-Biehla Terminus | RB 31 | Prösen Ost towards Dresden Hbf |
| Preceding station | Ostdeutsche Eisenbahn | Following station |
| Hohenleipisch towards Wismar | RE 8 | Terminus |
| Preceding station | Mitteldeutsche Regiobahn | Following station |
| Terminus | RB 45 | Prösen towards Chemnitz Hbf |
Location

Elsterwerda station is in the town of Elsterwerda in the German state of Brandenburg. It lies on the Berlin–Dresden railway. The station is known for a train crash in 1997, when a freight train with 22 petrol tankers derailed and exploded on the station premises.

== Infrastructure ==
The station has had three platform edges since its reconstruction in the 1990s:

- the main platform next to the station building, which is 300 m long and 55 cm high,
- an island platform, which is 300 m long and 38 cm high.

An underpass that is reached by stairs connects the island platform with the main platform.

== History ==
Friedrich Jage, a master mason and later an honorary citizen of Elsterwerda, built the then three-storey station building according to the specifications of the Berlin-Dresden Railway Company (Berlin-Dresdener Eisenbahn-Gesellschaft) in "American"-style timber construction. The station was opened with the Berlin-Dresden railway on 17 June 1875 without a public opening ceremony. The first railway station master was a Mr Bruttloff. Excursion trains ran from Berlin to Dresden for an industrial exhibition on 10 and 17 July 1875. The 22 kilometre-long Riesa–Elsterwerda railway was opened on 15 October 1875.

In the following years, the railway became one of the strongest economic enterprises of the city and due to the good rail connections several industrial companies settled in Elsterwerda and nearby Biehla, causing significant population growth. The population increased from 1,739 in 1871 to 2,537 in 1895 and 4,224 in 1910.

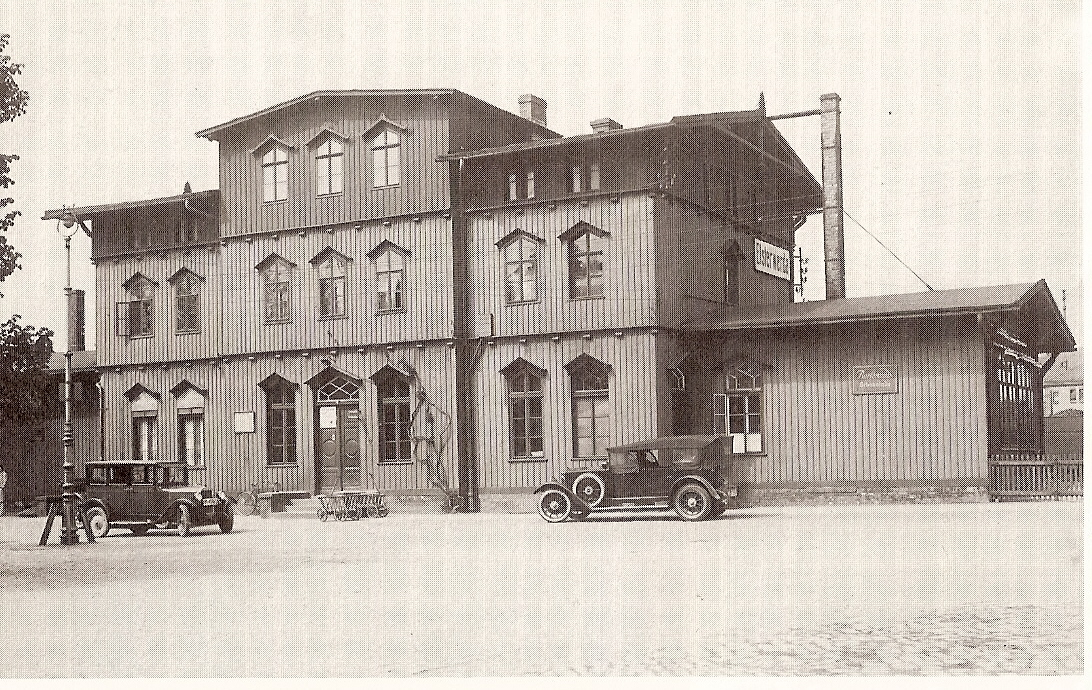
The station building in 1923

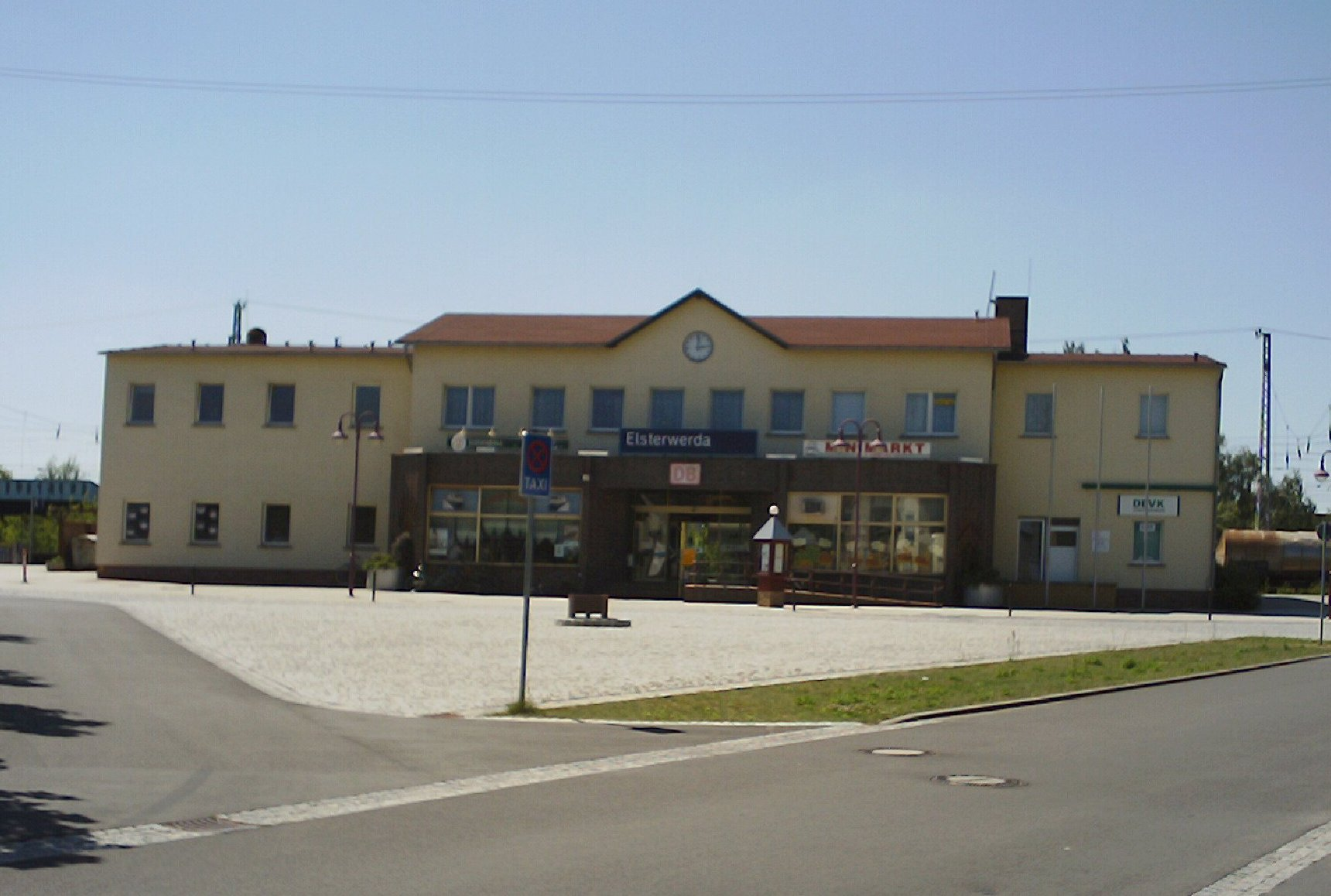
The station building in 2006

A highlight of the station was a visit by Wilhelm II, German Emperor on a special train on 27 August 1888, which stopped for about ten minutes at the station.

There was a proposal in March 1894 for the construction of a railway line from Elsterwerda to Kamenz, but this was never realised, like many other railway projects at that time.

Because the station was a border station between Prussia and Saxony, the operation of the station was shared between Prussian and Saxon officials. According to a personnel list of 21 November 1912, 129 Prussian and 24 Saxon railwaymen were employed in the station's freight facilities. It was later said in the town that the Prussian and Saxon officials threw inkwells during disputes.

In 1914, there were plans to build a railway line from Burxdorf via Elsterwerda to Ortrand and preliminary talks were held to promote the sale of the shares of the proposed company. This project eventually failed at the end of the 1920s.

The first air raids on Elsterwerda were carried out by the Allies in April 1945 and the town was attacked by low-flying aircraft. The station and its facilities were bombed on 19 April 1945. An ammunition train that was stopped in the station was hit, caused explosions that caused severe damage on the railway premises and to the centre of the town. The upper storey of the station building was badly damaged and it was not subsequently rebuilt.

After the end of the Second World War, clean-up and repair work on the railway premises soon began and so on 11 May 1945, the first train ran from the bridge over the Elbe in Niederwartha near Dresden via Elsterwerda to Berlin. As early as July 1945, 210 railwaymen were employed in Elsterwerda. Later, the administration of Elsterwerda station, which included the Elsterwerda locomotive depot and Elsterwerda-Biehla station, employed about 1,000 railway workers.

After the reunification of Germany, there were radical changes at the Elsterwerda precinct and it lost its significance. The locomotive depot was closed and the operation of locomotives was moved to other locations. A similar fate also affected the track maintenance operations. Employees were dismissed or transferred. The station building was reconstructed from 1988 to 1991, receiving a completely different look. The new station layout was completed in March 1992.

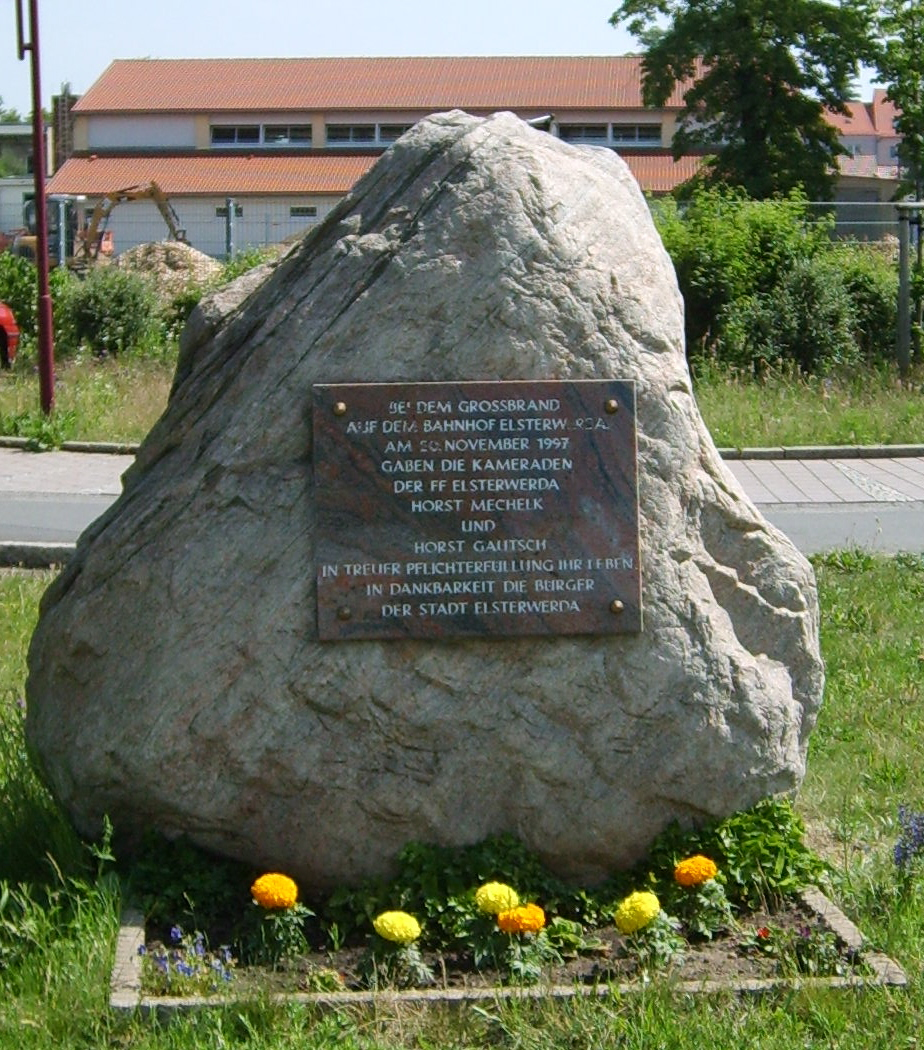
Memorial stone at Elsterwerda station

=== Train Derailment and Fire of 1997 ===
There was a serious accident affecting the entire station area and the adjacent depot on 20 November 1997, when a freight train with 22 petrol-filled tank cars derailed at a set of points due to speeding (90 km/h where 40 was required). Two ensuing explosions of the wagons and the huge fire caused severe damage to the station's buildings, infrastructure, the first fire trucks, other cars and the precinct. Two firefighters were killed by the explosion that happened after they arrived, and several others had to be treated for burns in hospital. A memorial stone was later erected in their honour in the grounds of the station. In total, 30 fire departments (Note: Translating "Feuerwehren" with fire departments is not exact at best, and the earlier might as well mean fire stations or "Löschzüge" (two fire engines with full equipment and 18 personnel, plus other vehicles like a ladder; something like a fire company?)) responded with 310 firefighters (working in shifts) and 62 vehicles, their operation lasted for 34 hours. Emergency rescue services attended with 14 vehicles and two helicopters.

The accident investigation revealed: An engine replacement at the previous stop, Berlin-Grünau, in the middle of the night, required testing of the brakes. But several errors (lack of attention, misperception, deficient communication) by the driver and the assigned train preparation technician occurred. The first error, caused by the driver, was to not connect the main brake's hoses and to not open the respective valves after coupling the engine to the first wagon. Filling the brake system by the engine happened far too fast, without the driver noticing. The irresponsive, still activated brakes were misdiagnosed by the technician (who had to service three trains at the same time) to have a pressure higher than what the engine supplied. He did not report this to the driver, but reset the brakes by emptying their air reservoirs. The actual brake test never happened, but the driver later claimed to have received a positive confirmation. The technician, in turn, did not abort the departure of the train. As the result, the train left with all brakes dysfunctional, except the ones of the engine. This emerged as late as the train had to slow down before entering Elsterwerda station.

The heavily damaged engine shed was later demolished and never rebuilt. The substantially damaged station building was renovated. 600 metric tonnes of petrol seeped into the soil and the sewage system during the disaster, and even after ten years, petrol was still being filtered out of the ground.

=== After the fire ===
In 2004, the station forecourt was completely rebuilt. Several of the buildings in this area were demolished and replaced by greenery and platforms for the bus station. The new works were formally inaugurated on 5 August 2004.

A siding runs from the station into the industrial area of Elsterwerda-West and there is also a container terminal.

From mid-2014 to July 2015, 3.6 km (2.2 mi) of track and seven switches were renewed in the station area, a barrier-free pedestrian underpass with two lifts and a 320 m (350 yd) long central platform were built, and further tracks and sets of points were dismantled. Around €5m had been spent by June 2015.

Between June 2014 and June 2016, an electronic signal box was built for the Elsterwerda and Hohenleipisch area. Signalling on the 6 km (3.7 mi)-long section was to be replaced by the end of 2016. The six-kilometre-long section of track was also to be renewed by the end of 2016.

Since 10 December 2017, Elsterwerda has been a stop for IC trains.

== Rail services ==
The station is served by the following service:

| Line | Route | Frequency (min) |
|---|---|---|
| EC Leipzig–Kraków | Leipzig – Elsterwerda – Ruhland – Węgliniec – Bolesławiec – Chojnów – Legnica – Wrocław – Kraków | Once daily |
| EC Leipzig–Przemyśl | Leipzig – Elsterwerda – Ruhland – Węgliniec – Bolesławiec – Chojnów – Legnica – Wrocław – Przemyśl | Once daily |
| IC 17 | (Chemnitz – Freiberg (Sachs) –) Dresden – Dresden-Neustadt – Elsterwerda – Doberlug-Kirchhain – BER Airport – Berlin Hbf – Berlin Gesundbrunnen – Oranienburg – Neustrelitz – Rostock – Warnemünde | 120 |
| RE 8 | Elsterwerda – Doberlug-Kirchhain – Luckau-Uckro – Wünsdorf-Waldstadt – Berlin Südkreuz – Berlin Hbf – Berlin-Spandau – Nauen – Wittenberge – Schwerin – Wismar | 120 |
| RE 13 | Elsterwerda – Elsterwerda-Biehla – Ruhland – Senftenberg – Cottbus (Mon-Fri only) | 120 |
| RB 31 | Elsterwerda-Biehla – Elsterwerda – Großenhain Cottb Bf – Coswig (b Dresden) – Cossebaude – Dresden-Friedrichstadt – Dresden | 120 |
| RB 45 | Elsterwerda – Tiefenau – Riesa – Döbeln – Waldheim – Mittweida – Chemnitz | 120 (60 at times) |
| FLX 30 | Dresden – Elsterwerda – Berlin – Hannover – Dortmund – Essen – Düsseldorf – Köln – Aachen | Some trains |
As of 14 December 2025
