= Klasdorf Glashütte station =

Railway station in Brandenburg, Germany

Klasdorf Glashütte
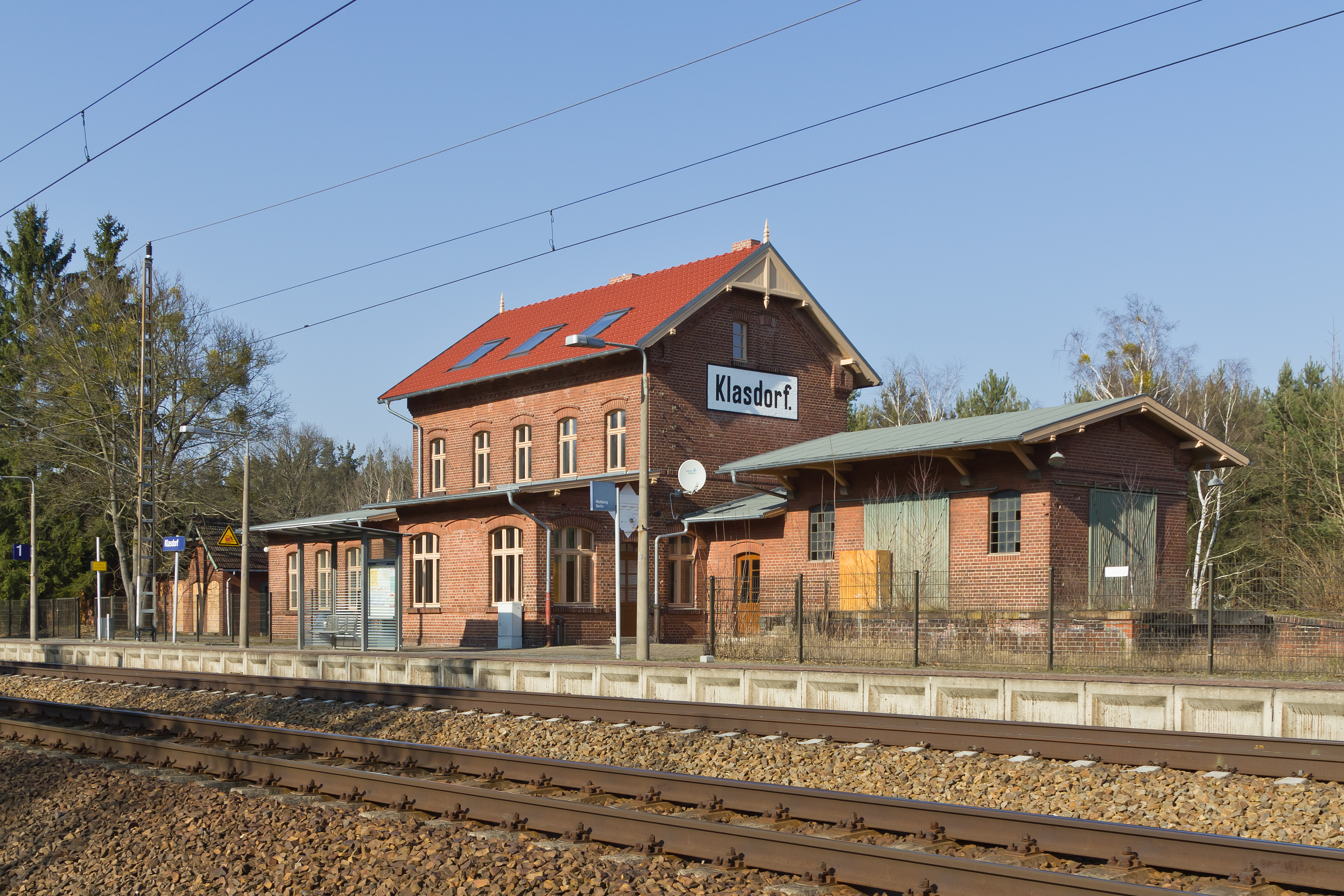
- Klasdorf Glashütte railway station

General information
- Location: Klasdorf, Baruth/Mark, Brandenburg; Germany
- Coordinates: 52°01′17″N 13°32′38″E
- Line: Berlin–Dresden railway
- Platforms: 2
- Tracks: 2

Construction
- Accessible: Yes

Other information
- Station code: 3220
- DS100 code: BKDF
- Category: 6
- Fare zone: : 6658
- Website: www.bahnhof.de

History
- Opened: 15 October 1875

Services
Preceding station	Ostdeutsche Eisenbahn	Following station
Baruth (Mark) towards Berlin Hbf	RE 8	Golßen towards Elsterwerda
Location
- Location within Brandenburg

Klasdorf Glashütte is a railway station in the village of Klasdorf in the municipality of Baruth/Mark, Brandenburg, Germany. The station lies of the Berlin–Dresden railway and the train services are operated by Ostdeutsche Eisenbahn.

In the 2026 timetable the following regional service stops at the station:

- Regional services RE 8 Berlin – Berlin Südkreuz – Wunsdorf-Waldstadt – Klasdorf Glashütte – Elsterwerda
