= Neuhof bei Zossen station =

Railway station in Zossen, Germany

Neuhof (b Zossen)
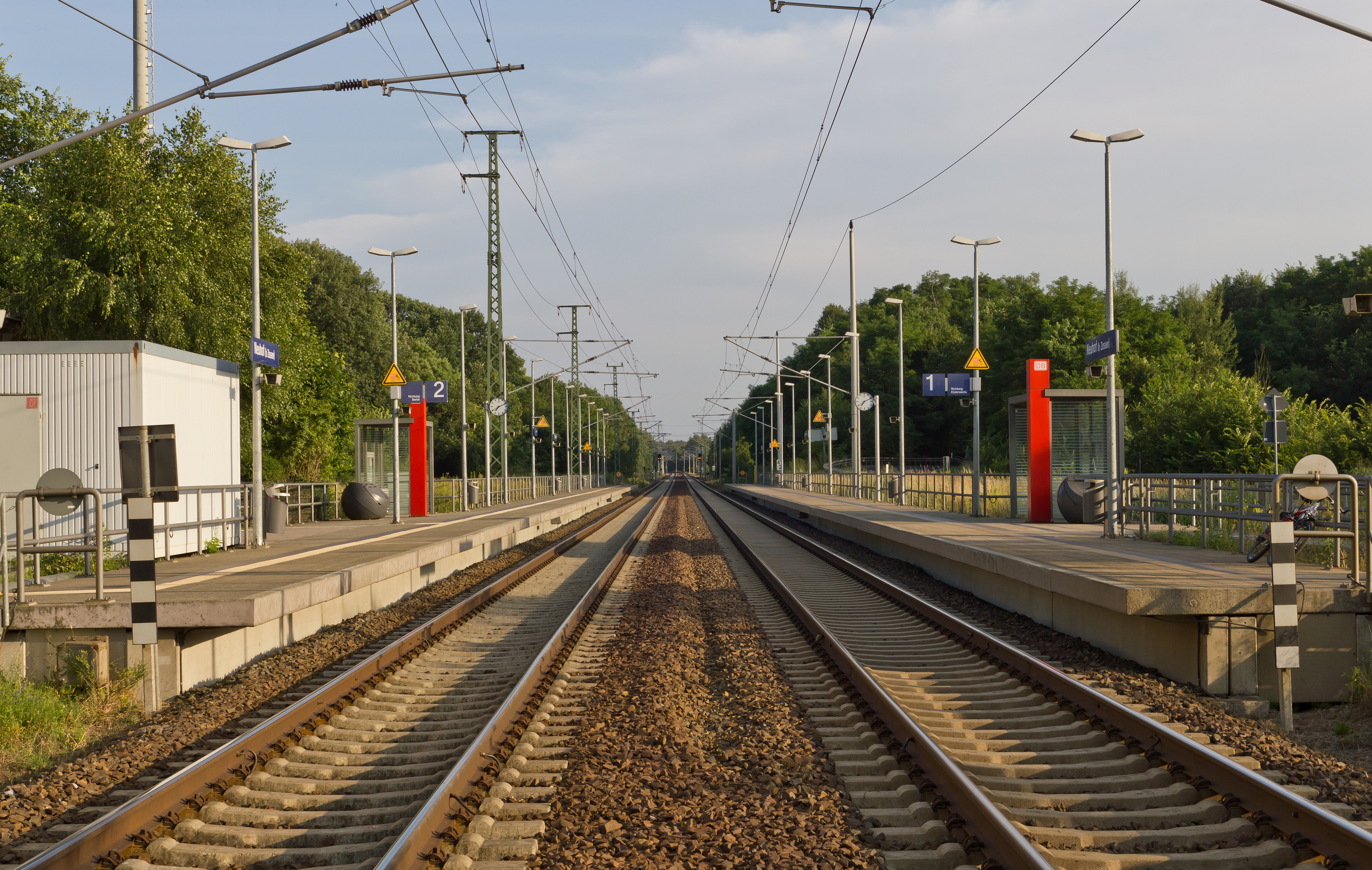
- Neuhof bei Zossen railway station

General information
- Location: Neuhof, Brandenburg; Germany
- Coordinates: 52°08′20″N 13°28′45″E
- Line: Berlin–Dresden railway
- Platforms: 2
- Tracks: 2

Construction
- Accessible: Yes

Other information
- Station code: 4401
- DS100 code: BNE
- Category: 6
- Fare zone: VBB: 6357
- Website: www.bahnhof.de

History
- Opened: 15 October 1878

Services
| Preceding station | Ostdeutsche Eisenbahn | Following station |
|---|---|---|
| Wünsdorf-Waldstadt towards Wismar | RE 8 | Baruth (Mark) towards Elsterwerda |
Location
- Location within Brandenburg

Neuhof bei Zossen (German: Bahnhof Neuhof bei Zossen) is a railway station in the village of Neuhof, Brandenburg, Germany. The station lies on the Berlin–Dresden railway and the train services are operated by Ostdeutsche Eisenbahn.

== Train services ==
In the 2026 timetable the following regional services stop at the station:

- Regional services RE 8 Berlin – Berlin Südkreuz – Wünsdorf-Waldstadt – Neuhof bei Zossen – Elsterwerda
