= Rückersdorf station =

Railway station in Rückersdorf, Brandenburg, Germany

Rückersdorf (Elst)
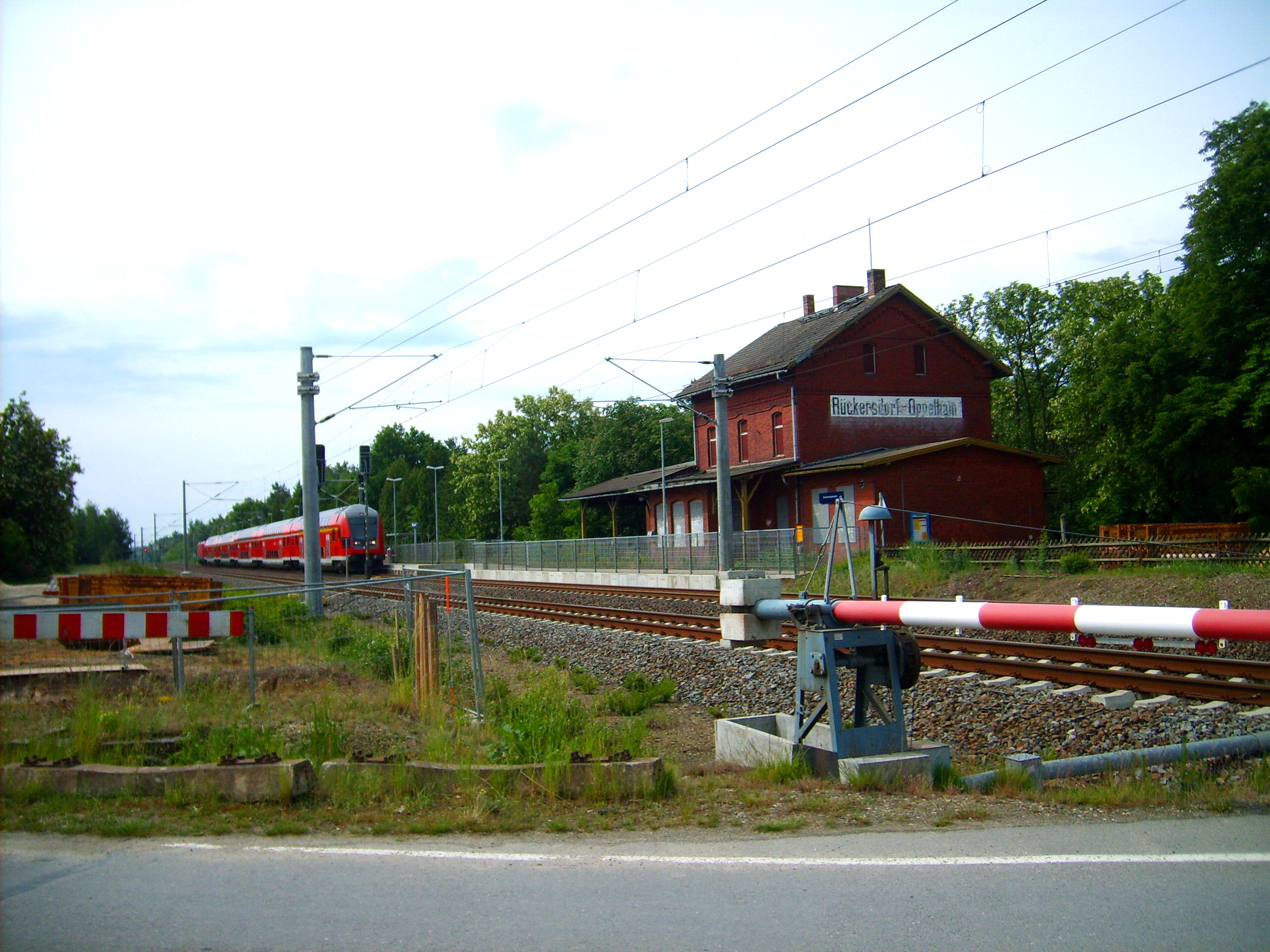
- Rückersdorf railway station

General information
- Location: Rückersdorf, Brandenburg; Germany
- Coordinates: 51°34′00″N 13°34′27″E
- Line: Berlin–Dresden railway
- Platforms: 1
- Tracks: 2

Construction
- Accessible: Yes

Other information
- Station code: 5411
- DS100 code: BRO
- Category: 7
- Fare zone: VBB: 7658
- Website: www.bahnhof.de

History
- Opened: 1 January 1897

Services
Preceding station	Ostdeutsche Eisenbahn	Following station
Doberlug-Kirchhain towards Wismar	RE 8	Hohenleipisch towards Elsterwerda
Location

Rückersdorf (German: Bahnhof Rückersdorf) is a railway station in the town of Rückersdorf, Brandenburg, Germany. The station lies of the Berlin–Dresden railway, and the train services are operated by Ostdeutsche Eisenbahn.

The station is served by the following service:

RE 8 Berlin – Berlin Südkreuz – Wunsdorf-Waldstadt – Rückersdorf – Elsterwerda

== See also ==
- List of railway stations in Brandenburg
