= Berlin Dresdner Bahnhof =

Railway station in Friedrichshain-Kreuzberg, Germany

Coordinates: 52.4989°N 13.3752°E

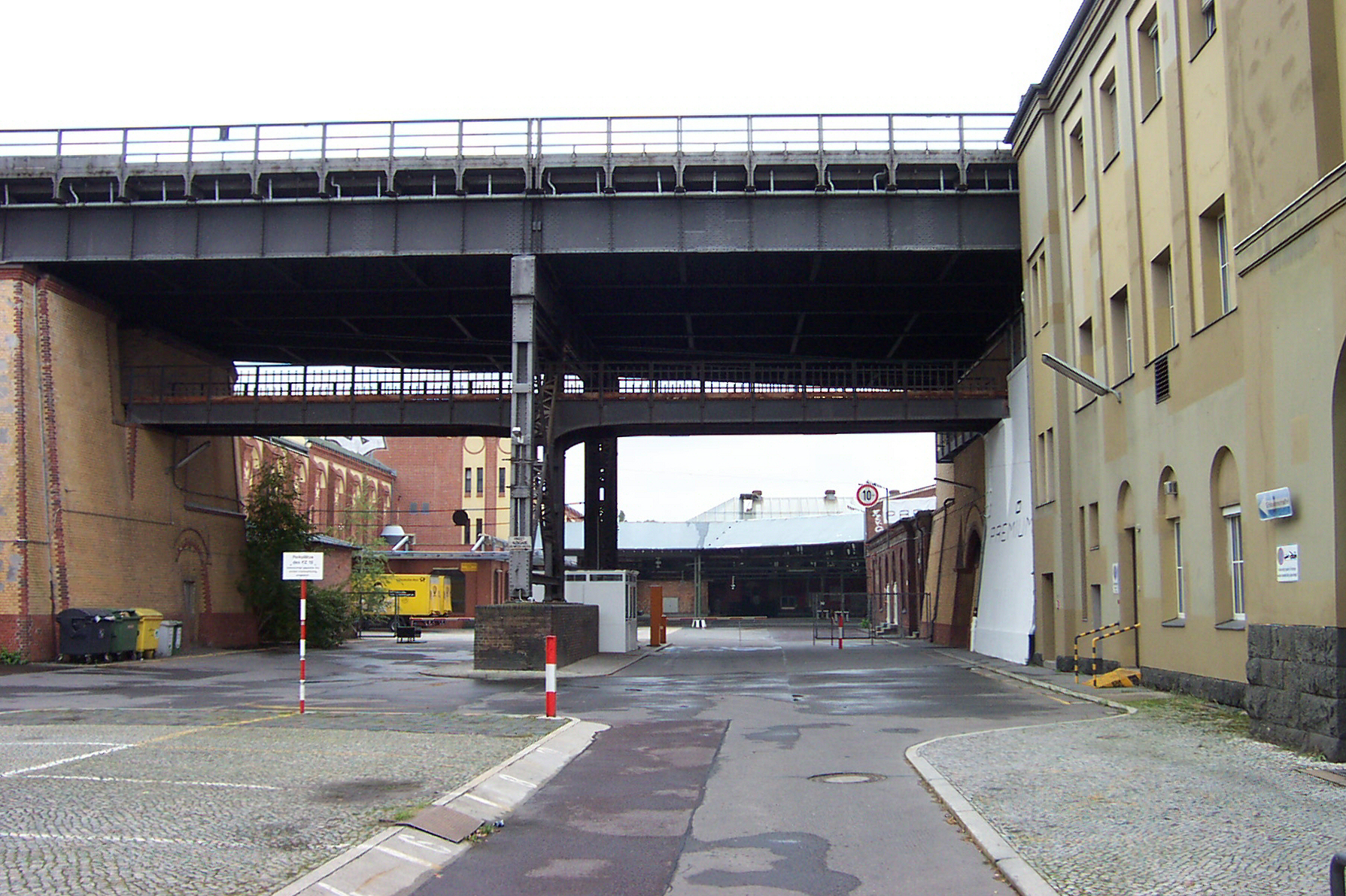
- Site of former Dresdner Bahnhof and Postbahnhof on Luckenwalder Straße, October 2005

General information
- Location: Friedrichshain-Kreuzberg, Berlin, Berlin; Germany

History
- Opened: 17 June 1875
- Closed: 15 October 1882
Location

The Dresdner Bahnhof was a short-lived passenger railway terminus in Berlin, Germany, operating from 1875 to 1882 and handling train services to and from Dresden over the Berlin–Dresden railway.

== Characteristics ==
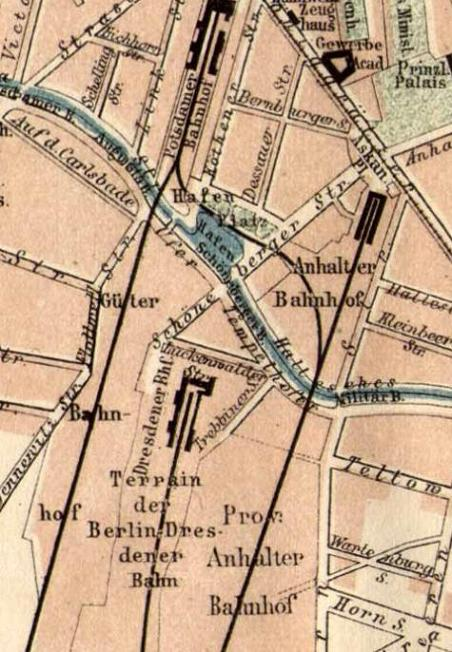
Dresdner Bahnhof (centre) on an 1875 map

The station building was fairly small in size and inconveniently located some distance from the Berlin city centre, south of the Landwehrkanal. The surrounding area in the Tempelhofer Vorstadt quarter (today part of the Kreuzberg district) was largely dominated by railway infrastructure. Close by were the approach tracks of the larger Anhalter Bahnhof and Potsdamer Bahnhof, and their associated goods stations and locomotive depots.

== History ==
As a passenger terminus was inaugurated with the opening of the Berlin–Dresden railway line on 17 June 1875. Trains ran to the Berliner Bahnhof in Dresden's Friedrichstadt quarter, about 174 km (108 mi) in the south, with through coaches to Prague and Vienna. Only a provisional half-timbered station building had been erected; plans for a large entrance hall were never carried out.

The Dresdner Bahnhof received its last passenger train on 15 October 1882, and was officially closed the year after. Following the recent rebuilding of both the Anhalter and Potsdamer passenger termini to cope with rapidly increasing traffic, all services were transferred from the Dresdner Bahnhof to these two other stations, the Anhalter Bahnhof receiving the lion's share. It took on all long-distance services, and it was largely through this that it became known as Berlin's "Gateway to the South," its trains ultimately reaching Rome, Naples and Athens. The Potsdamer Bahnhof inherited mainly short-haul and suburban traffic.

The temporary passenger station was removed over the next years. In 1913, the area was used to build a much larger facility - the Postbahnhof, dedicated to the handling of mail. By then there were even more rails in the immediate vicinity following the arrival of the U-Bahn. Its original route, opened in stages during 1902, comprised a through section from Warschauer Brücke to Knie, with a triangular junction between Möckernbrücke and Bülowstraße giving access to Potsdamer Platz. This triangle of lines gave its name to the area (Gleisdreieck, literally meaning "railway triangle"), and also to the station constructed there. Following an accident on 26 September 1908, in which two trains collided on the triangle, killing 18 people and injuring 21 others, the layout was reorganised in 1912 into what can be seen today, with two lines crossing one over the other at right angles, and a split-level station with platforms on both lines. The Dresdner Bahnhof, and the Postbahnhof of which it became part, lay in the south-east quadrant, right in the angle between the two lines. In this guise it lasted for eight more decades, finally closing in 1997.

In the photograph on the top, taken in October 2005, the bridge carries U-Bahn lines 1 and 3. A train crossing it from left to right (east to west) will run into Gleisdreieck station (high level platforms) just seconds later. The Postbahnhof is nowadays used for concerts, parties, exhibitions and cultural events (please note that this Postbahnhof should not be confused with another venue, apparently of the same name, about 3 km away near Berlin Ostbahnhof).

== See also ==
- Prussian state railways
- German Museum of Technology
