= Hohenleipisch station =

Railway station in Hohenleipisch, Germany

Hohenleipisch
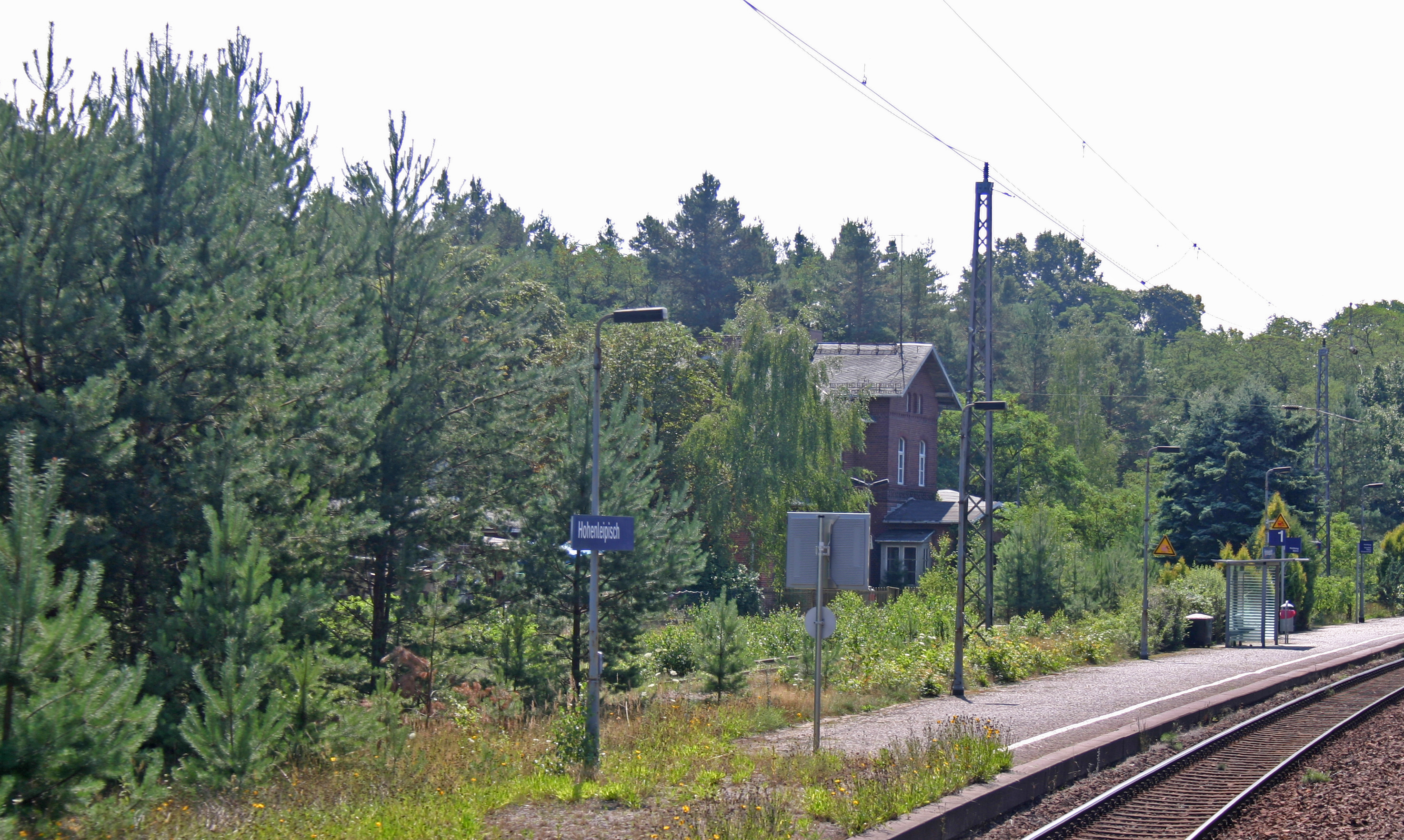
- Hohenleipisch railway station

General information
- Location: Hohenleipisch, Brandenburg; Germany
- Coordinates: 51°29′54″N 13°34′27″E
- Line: Berlin–Dresden railway
- Platforms: 1
- Tracks: 3

Construction
- Accessible: No

Other information
- Station code: 2849
- DS100 code: BHL
- Category: 6
- Fare zone: VBB: 7758
- Website: www.bahnhof.de

History
- Opened: 15 October 1878

Services
Preceding station	Ostdeutsche Eisenbahn	Following station
Rückersdorf towards Wismar	RE 8	Elsterwerda Terminus
Location

Hohenleipisch (German: Bahnhof Hohenleipisch) is a railway station in the town of Hohenleipisch, Brandenburg, Germany. The station lies of the Berlin–Dresden railway and the train services are operated by Deutsche Bahn.

The station is served by the following service:

RE 8 Berlin – Berlin Südkreuz – Wunsdorf-Waldstadt – Hohenleipisch – Elsterwerda

== See also ==
- List of railway stations in Brandenburg
