= Baruth (Mark) station =

Railway station in Germany

Baruth (Mark)
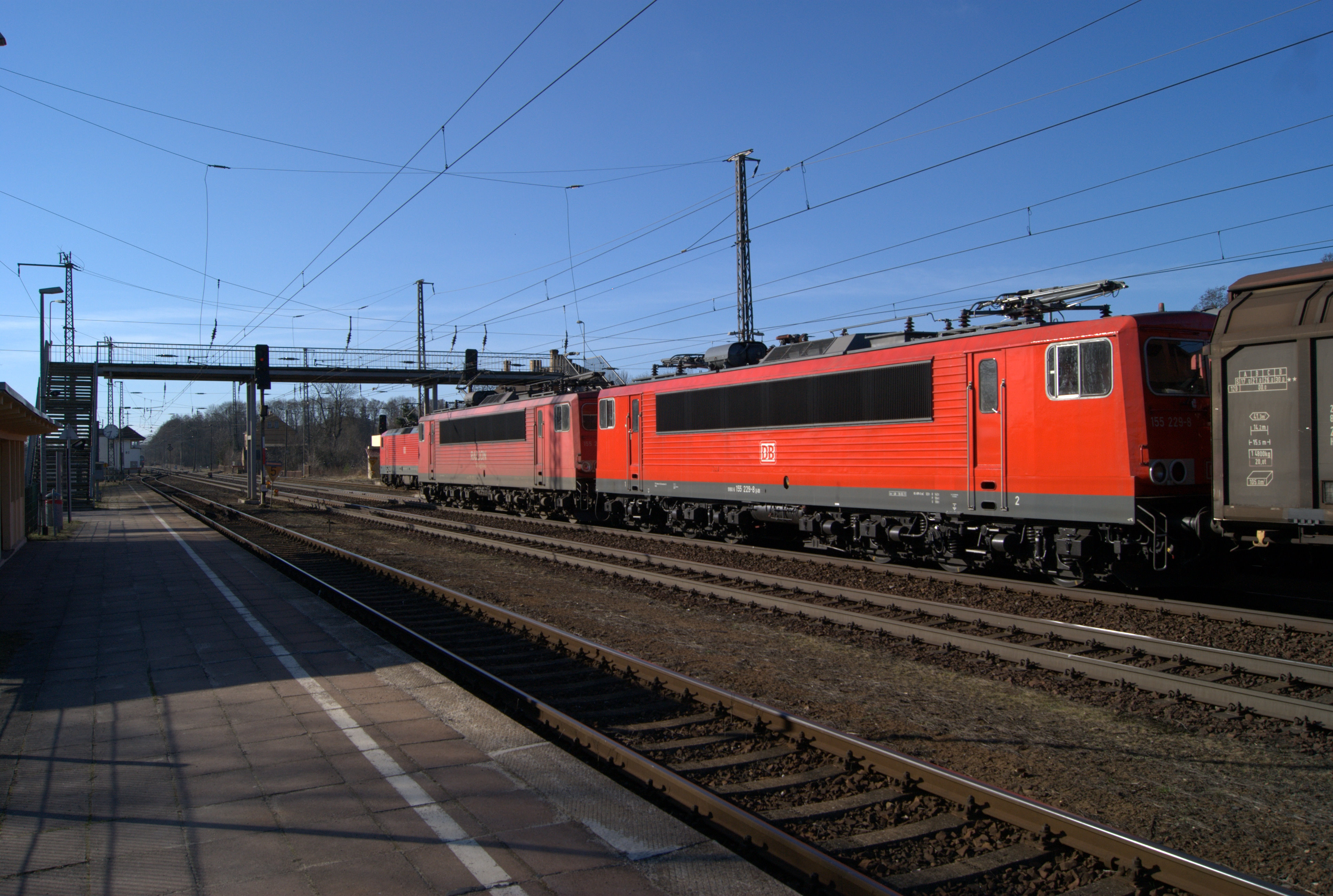
- Baruth railway station

General information
- Location: Bahnhofstr.5, 15837 Baruth/Mark, Brandenburg; Germany
- Coordinates: 52°03′28″N 13°30′43″E
- Line: Berlin–Dresden railway
- Platforms: 2
- Tracks: 4

Construction
- Accessible: Yes

Other information
- Station code: 421
- DS100 code: BBA
- Category: 6
- Fare zone: : 6657
- Website: www.bahnhof.de

History
- Opened: 17 June 1875

Services
Preceding station	Ostdeutsche Eisenbahn	Following station
Neuhof bei Zossen towards Wismar	RE 8	Klasdorf Glashütte towards Elsterwerda
Location
- Location within Brandenburg

Baruth (Mark) railway station (German: Bahnhof Baruth (Mark)) is a railway station in the town of Baruth/Mark, Brandenburg, Germany. The station lies on the Berlin–Dresden railway and the train services are operated by Ostdeutsche Eisenbahn.

In the 2026 timetable the following regional services stop at the station:

- Regional services RE 8 Berlin – Berlin Südkreuz – Wunsdorf-Waldstadt – Baruth (Mark) – Elsterwerda
