= Berlin–Dresden railway =

Railway line in Germany

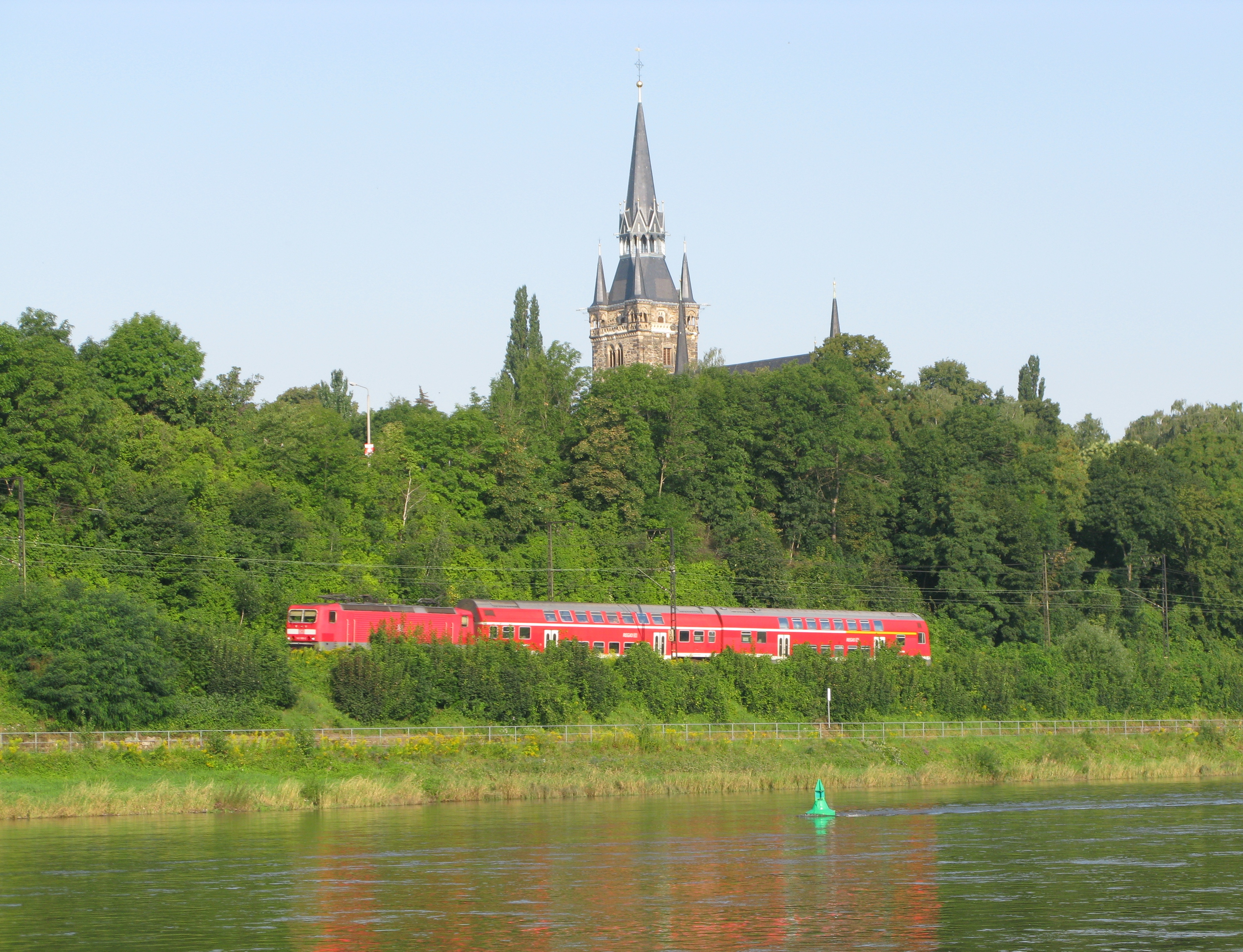
- RegionalBahn train in Dresden

Overview
- Line number: 6135 (Bln. Südkreuz–Elsterwerda); 6248 (Elsterwerda–Dr.-Friedrichst.)
- Locale: Berlin, Brandenburg and Saxony
- Termini: Berlin Dresdner Bahnhof; Dresden-Friedrichstadt yard

Service
- Route number: 200.2 (Yorckstraße–Blankenfelde); 203 (Glasower Damm–Elsterwerda); 225 (Elsterwerda–Dresden Hbf); 240 (all traffic)

Technical
- Line length: 174.2 km (108.2 mi)
- Track gauge: 1,435 mm (4 ft 8 1/2 in) standard gauge
- Electrification: 15 kV/16.7 Hz AC overhead catenary
- Operating speed: 160 km/h (100 mph) (maximum)
Route map
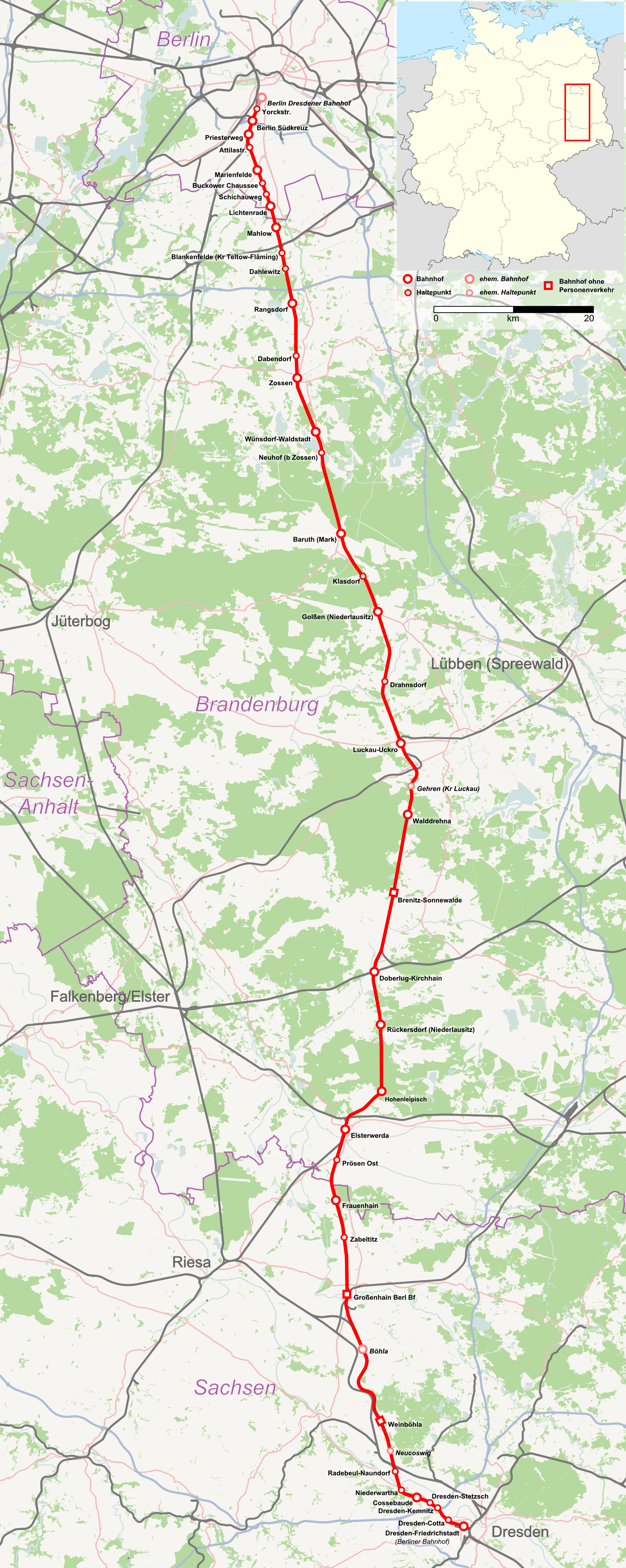
                  
- Source

The Berlin–Dresden railway is a double track, electrified main line railway in the German states of Berlin, Brandenburg and Saxony, which was originally built and operated by the Berlin-Dresden Railway Company (Berlin-Dresdener Eisenbahn-Gesellschaft). It runs from Berlin through the southern Teltow countryside and then between Lower Lusatia and Fläming Heath through Elsterwerda and the Großenhainer Pflege countryside to Dresden.

Upgrades completed in December 2017 enabled maximum speeds of 160 km/h (99 mph). The traditional route through the southern suburbs of Berlin was reopened for long-distance trains in December 2025. Work is under way to allow speeds of 200 km/h (120 mph) on parts of the line.

== History ==
=== Up to 1945 ===
In 1848 the Berlin-Anhalt Railway Company opened the Jüterbog–Röderau line, connecting with the Leipzig–Dresden line and creating the first direct rail link between Berlin and Dresden. In 1872 the Berlin-Dresden Railway Company was founded to build a competing a line via Elsterwerda that was 12 km (7.5 mi) shorter. This route was opened on 17 June 1875. Long-distance traffic between Berlin and Dresden was divided between the two routes until the end of World War II.

1 October 1877 management of the line was taken over by Prussian state railways. On 24 January 1887 Saxony and Prussia contracted a treaty, under which ownership of the company passed to Prussia from 1 April 1887. This treaty also provided that the Elsterwerda–Dresden section was resold to the Saxon government on 1 April 1888, when it became part of the Royal Saxon State Railways.

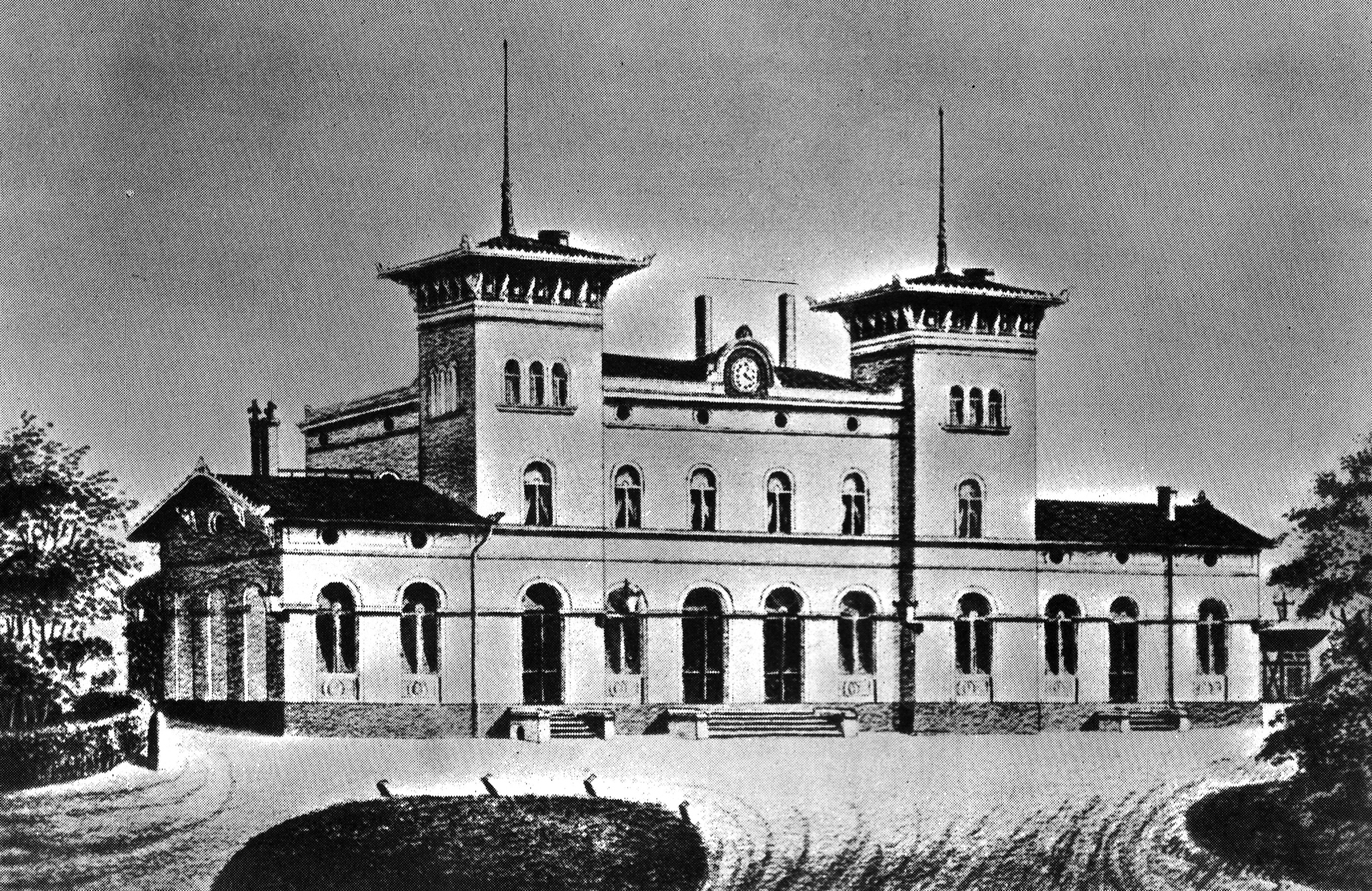
Großenhain Berlin station in 1875

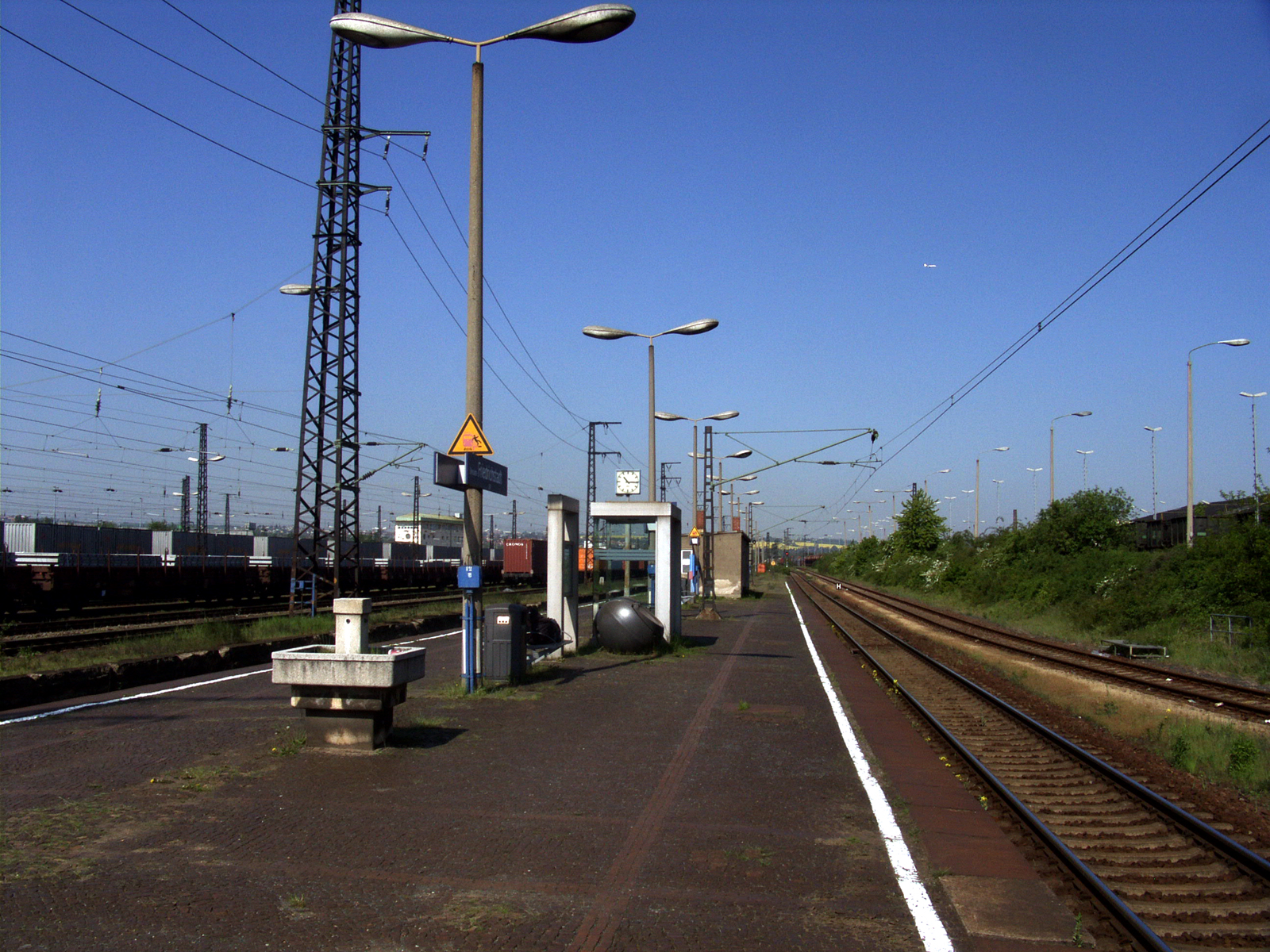
Former Berlin station in Dresden, now part of a goods yard

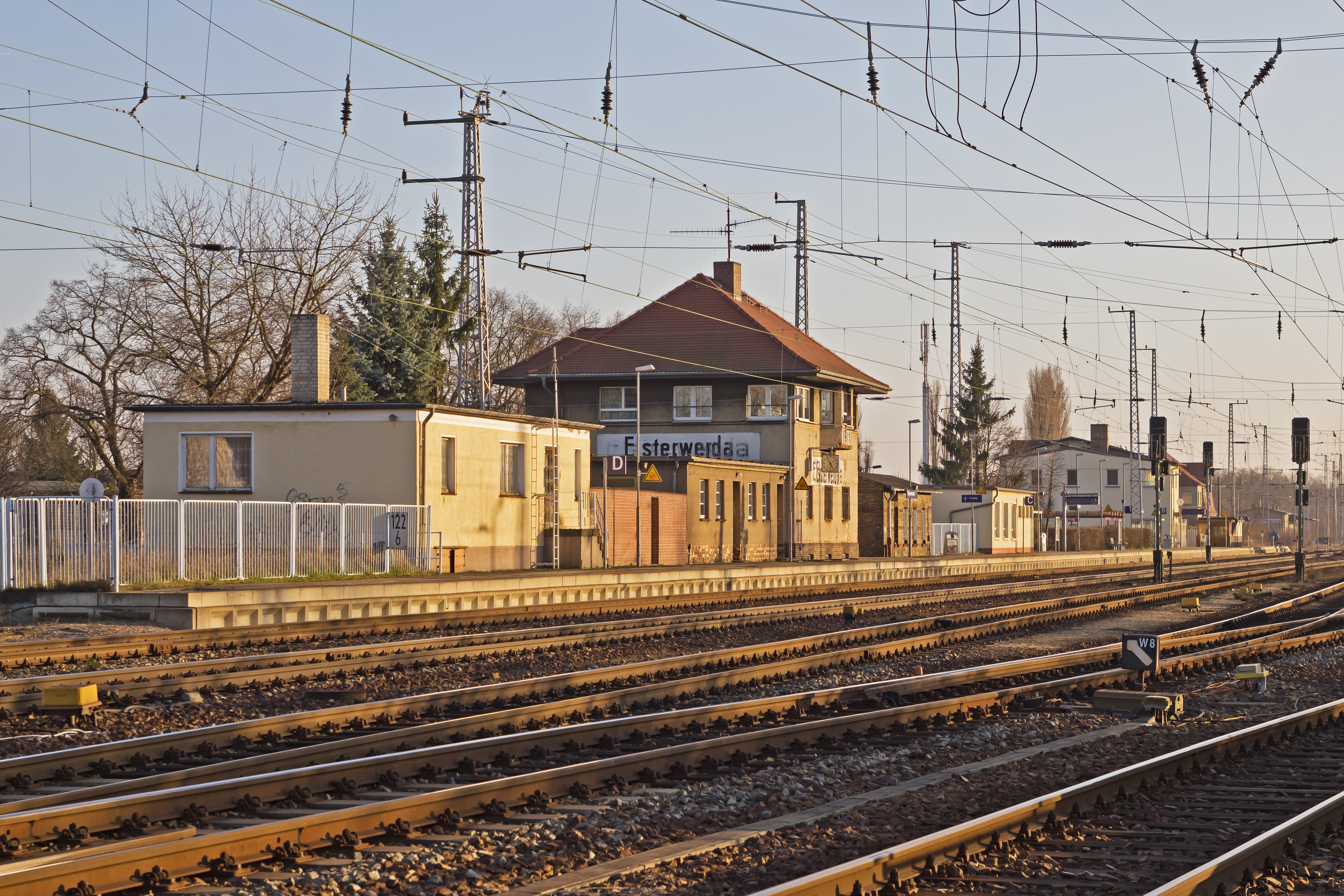
Elsterwerda station

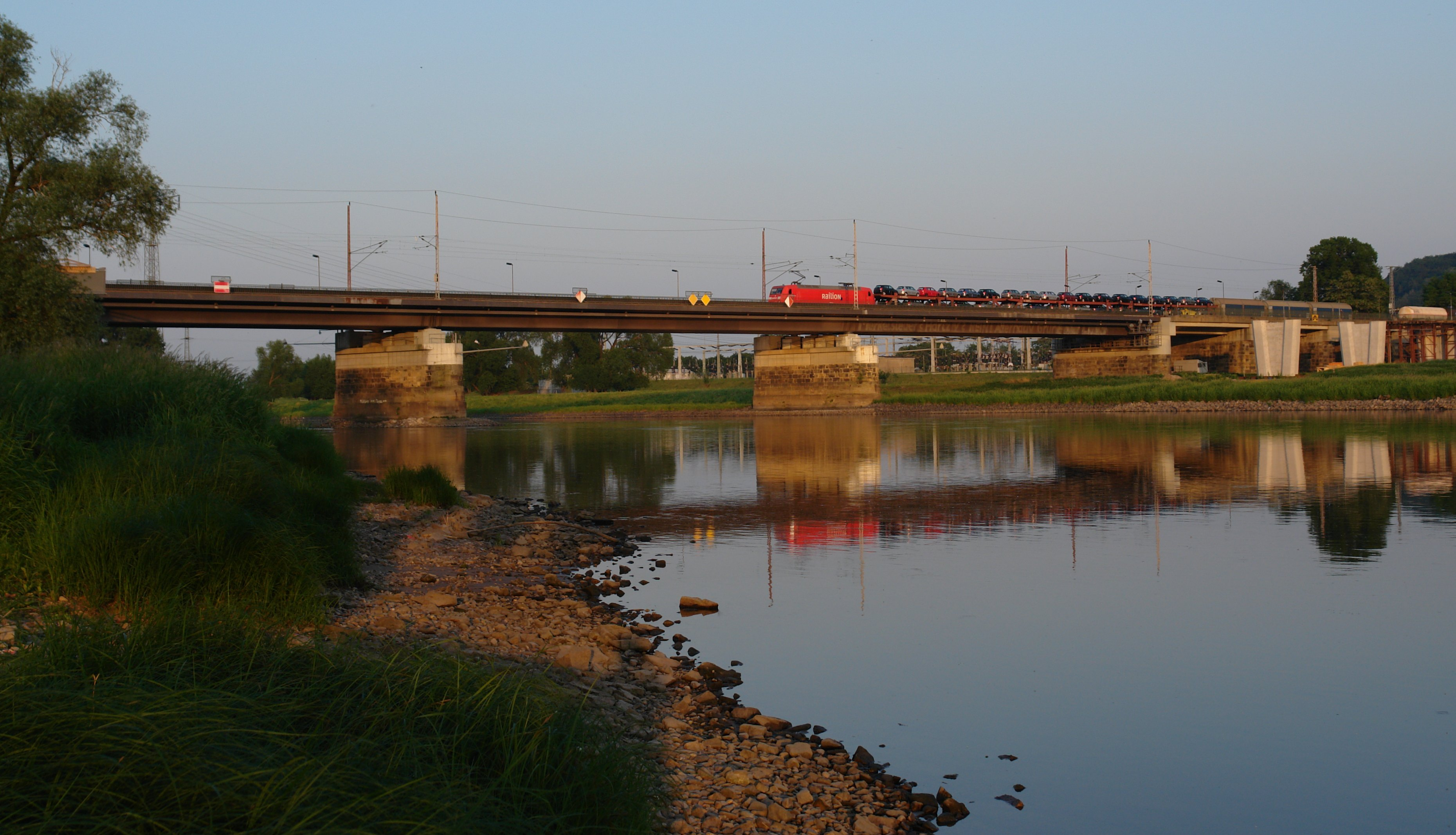
Elbe bridge in Niederwartha

At both ends of the line new stations were built, the Dresdner Bahnhof (Dresden station) in Berlin and Berliner Bahnhof (Berlin station) in Dresden. Both stations were used only briefly. In 1882 the Dresden station in Berlin (located on the site of the present-day Gleisdreieck U-Bahn station and the former postal station in Luckenwalder Strasse) was closed for passenger traffic. The line’s Berlin terminus was moved a little further north to the Anhalter Bahnhof (Anhalt station). A little later, the Berlin station in Dresden was abandoned as part of the redevelopment of the Dresden railway node. In its place the Dresden-Friedrichstadt station was built, which has been used since 1894 for freight and regional services. Since that time, long distance services have turned off towards Radebeul-Zitzschewig on the Leipzig–Dresden line and Dresden-Neustadt to Dresden Hauptbahnhof. In contrast, freight trains to and from Leipzig use the Berlin–Dresden railway from Radebeul-Naundorf station to Friedrichstadt.

The Prussian and Saxon railway administrations initially did not cooperate with the use of locomotives. Although carriages were hauled between Berlin and Dresden early on, the locomotives were changed in Elsterwerda. This caused financial losses and prevented a reduction in travel time. It was not until 1 May 1905 that the railway administration introduced locomotive operations with both Prussian and Saxon locomotives.

From 1875 until World War I the Prussian military railway ran parallel with the line from Berlin to Zossen. Between 1901 and 1903, the line between Marienfelde and Zossen was reinforced so that the Studiengesellschaft für Elektrische Schnellbahnen (Study Society for Electric Rapid Railways) could carry out tests with three-phase rapid transit sets and locomotives. On 28 October 1903, the record speed of 210.8 km/h (131.0 mph) was achieved on this line. In 1904, high-speed tests with steam locomotives followed on the upgraded military railway line. After the First World War, the military railway was disbanded as a military unit and operations on the military railway track between Berlin and Zossen were stopped. In the 1920s, the track in this section was dismantled and the military railway station facilities continued to be used by the Reichsbahn.

With the construction of the Teltow Canal, which opened in 1906, three new bridges for the Dresden Railway and the Military Railway became necessary south of the Mariendorf S-Bahn station (now Attilastraße).

At the southern end of the Tempelhof marshalling yard (near Priesterweg S-Bahn station, the long-distance tracks and the suburban tracks of the Dresden Railway were separated from the tracks of the Berlin–Halle railway. There was a separate pair of tracks for suburban traffic as far as Mariendorf station (later called Attilastraße). South of this station, long-distance traffic and suburban traffic shared a two-track line.

In 1936 a high-speed express service commenced between Berlin and Dresden using the Henschel-Wegmann Train, taking 100 minutes. The Berlin suburb train operations were electrified in 1939 and 1940. Berlin S-Bahn services commenced on 15 May 1939 between Priesterweg and Mahlow and on 6 October 1940 the S-Bahn was extended to Rangsdorf. The S-Bahn shared tracks in southern Berlin with long-distance passenger and freight trains. At the end of the 1930s work began on the new track to separate the S-Bahn and long-distance tracks, but by the beginning of the Second World War this work was not completed.

In April 1945, S-Bahn services ceased as a result of the war.

=== Reopening in 1945 ===
After the end of the war in 1945 the railway line was seriously damaged by the allies. In addition the bridges over the Teltow Canal in Berlin were blown up in the last days of the war by the German army. Later the line’s second track was dismantled to provide reparations to the Soviet Union. Only two tracks have been restored on these bridges. Services resumed between August and October 1945. Between Mariendorf and Marienfelde stations S-Bahn services and the remaining passenger and freight services ran on a common two-track section. Between Rangsdorf and Wünsdorf steam suburban trains operated to connect with the S-Bahn.

The division of Germany and Berlin also affected the traffic on the Berlin-Dresden line. In 1951, a connecting curve was built in an easterly direction from the line linking with the newly established Berlin outer ring. Long-distance trains from Dresden used it to avoid West Berlin. The terminal stations on West Berlin territory were closed, including the Anhalt station on 18 May 1952. Afterwards regional services used the outer ring to reach the East Berlin stations of Schöneweide, Lichtenberg or Ostbahnhof. Only the S-Bahn service from Rangsdorf ran over the border into West Berlin. Freight services continued to operate in West Berlin from the north to Marienfelde station (including to the gas works at Mariendorf and the Daimler factory at Marienfelde). The remaining long-distance tracks south of Marienfelde station was partially dismantled or became overgrown in the following decades.

After the building of the Berlin Wall on 13 August 1961, S-Bahn-operations between Lichtenrade and Mahlow were abandoned. S-Bahn services initially operated a shuttle service between Mahlow and Rangsdorf, but this was discontinued on 9 October 1961 due to the lack of repair and storage facilities. Commuter trains from Wünsdorf ran to Schönefeld Airport station. From 1962 there was an S-Bahn service to Berlin. As of 26 May 1963 a shuttle train consisting of a class VT 2.09 railbus (known as the "piglet taxi") ran between Mahlow and Blankenfelde, connecting to services on the outer ring.

=== Upgrading of the line since the 1960s ===
The low capacity of the single-track line and the poor condition of the track had long caused operational problems. The high density of freight on the line left only a small number of paths for fast passenger trains. An improvement occurred in 1972, after the second track was fully restored. In the 1960s, work began on the raising of maximum speeds on the line to 160 km/h (99 mph). The stations from Baruth/Mark to Brenitz-Sonnewalde were converted for high speed with the relocation of platforms onto sidings. For various reasons, trains could still only operate at 120 km/h (75 mph).

The section from Dresden-Friedrichstadt to Radebeul-Naundorf was electrified on 28 September 1969. The adjoining section to the Berlin outer ring, including the two connections to the ring, followed in several sections from 1979 to 1983. A few years after the West Berlin S-Bahn network was taken over by the Berliner Verkehrsbetriebe, the reconstruction began on the missing second track between Marienfelde and Lichtenrade in 1988.

The route had heavy express train traffic towards Czechoslovakia, Hungary, Romania, Bulgaria and Austria as well as inland traffic in the GDR. The notable trains included the Vindobona Express from Berlin to Vienna from 1957 and the Hungaria Express between Berlin and Budapest since 1960. Other important long-distance trains were the Balt-Orient Express to Bucharest, the Pannonia Express to Sofia and the Meridian to Belgrade, which at times ran as far as Bar on the Adriatic. From 1976 onwards, the Städteexpress ("city express") Elbflorenz connected Berlin with Dresden and "Fichtelberg" connected Berlin with Karl-Marx-Stadt (now Chemnitz) on this line. They ran to Berlin in the morning and in the opposite direction in the afternoon. Later, the Berlin Express train pair was added, which ran to Dresden in the morning and to Berlin in the afternoon.

In local transport, trains ran approximately every hour between Schönefeld (bei Berlin) station and Wünsdorf, and some continued to Baruth. On the other sections, the importance of local transport was low. For many years only four passenger trains a day ran between Baruth and Elsterwerda. South of Elsterwerda in the Dresden catchment area, there were somewhat more services.

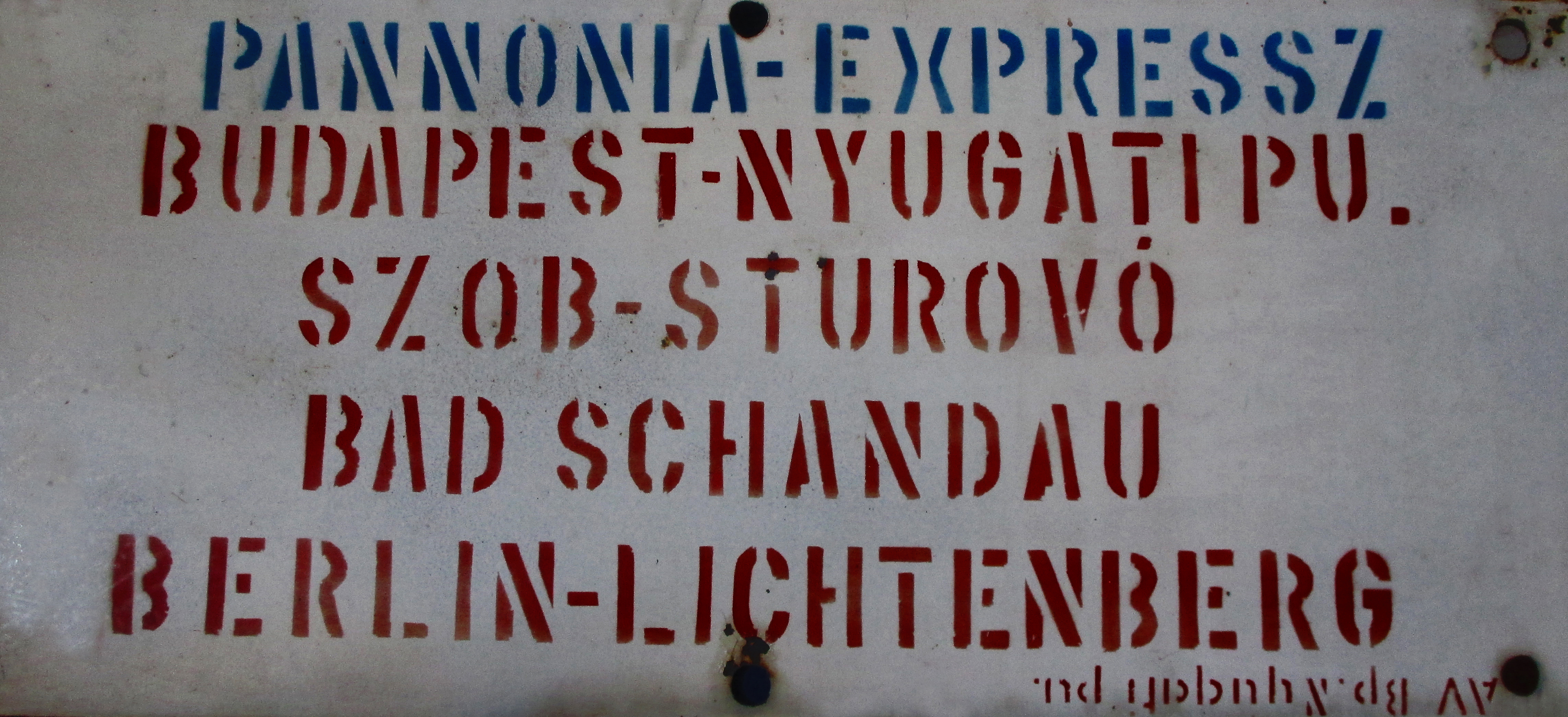
Train route sign: Pannonia-Express Budapest – Bad Schandau – Berlin-Lichtenberg

The route was also heavily used for freight transport. The Dresden-Friedrichstadt marshalling yard was an important hub for north-south traffic. There was extensive traffic between Scandinavia as well as the Baltic Sea ports and the inland countries towards southern Europe. In addition, heavy block trains carrying raw lignite and in double traction were transported between Elsterwerda and Dresden. In the 1980s, up to 140 train journeys were made in the Weinböhla area each day.

=== Development in the 1990s ===
After the fall of the Wall, the gap between Lichtenrade and Mahlow was closed for the S-Bahn and traffic to Blankenfelde was resumed on a single track on 31 August 1992. Occasionally, freight trains with compacted waste containers even ran on the S-Bahn track from the Gradestrasse transfer station to landfills south of Berlin.

On 17 May 1991, Deutsche Reichsbahn commissioned the Berlin and Dresden Reichsbahn rail divisions to quickly upgrade the line for a maximum speed of 160 km/h (99 mph). On 15 July 1991, the board of the Deutsche Reichsbahn adopted appropriate measures. Less than a year was available for implementation. The planned costs were DM 145 million. In some cases, preparations should also be made for a top speed of 200 km/h. In November 1991, WSSB Verkehrstechnik GmbH, which belongs to Siemens, was awarded the contract to retrofit the control and safety technology. From January to May 1992, extensive retrofitting and renewal work was carried out on the line. The PZB train protection system was also installed, electrical supply lines were changed and the overhead line system was slightly adjusted. The rail track was not changed. When the timetable changed in May 1992, the maximum speed was increased in sections to 160 km/h. At the same time, switches with larger radii were installed, signal distances were increased and 100 new switch drives were installed. The signalling block system was automated throughout. This reduced travel times on long-distance transport by 35 minutes to under two hours. For the first time in several decades, speeds of more than 120 km/h (75 mph) were operated on the line. The scheduled travel time for long-distance traffic between Berlin Ostbahnhof and Dresden Hauptbahnhof was one hour and 59 minutes. Like the historic Henschel-Wegmann Train, it ran via Radebeul and Dresden-Neustadt on the Leipzig–Dresden railway to Dresden Hauptbahnhof. Deutsche Reichsbahn had purchased class 112 locomotives for express traffic.

In 1992, IC line 7 (Dresden–Prague) was introduced with a service at two-hour intervals with a connection to Hamburg. From 25 September 1994, a pair of ICE trains ran along the line every day. The ICE ran from Berlin Zoologischer Garten station to Dresden Hauptbahnhof in the evening and in the opposite direction in the morning. From 1998, the ICE ran via Berlin Ostbahnhof before the ICE connection was discontinued on 27 May 2000.

The D-Zugs running on the line were converted in 1992 by Deutsche Reichsbahn into Interregios from Rostock to Chemnitz on the Berlin to Elsterwerda section. All through rail services with stops along the way to Dresden were discontinued and replaced by regional trains with the opportunity of changing in Elsterwerda. The connections without intermediate stops on the route, for instance those of the Vindobona, were reclassified as InterCity services from Hamburg to Dresden and EuroCity services from Hamburg, Berlin to Budapest, Prague, Vienna and used with carriages from ČD, DB, MÁV and ÖBB.

The Elsterwerda train disaster occurred on 20 November 1997 at Elsterwerda station. A brake failure caused a tank car block train loaded with petrol to derail due to excessive speed. Two wagons exploded and 15 others burned out.

=== Situation from 2000 to 2020 ===
At the beginning of the new millennium, the condition of the route had noticeably deteriorated due to inadequate maintenance in the 1990s. Since 2002, regional traffic has been relocated between Großenhain and Radebeul-Naundorf to the Großenhain–Priestewitz and Leipzig–Dresden lines. From Coswig, regional traffic was relocated from the Leipzig line via Dresden-Neustadt to the longer, original Berlin line via Cossebaude. This was part of a scheme to segregate traffic so that on the Großenhain–Dresden and Medessen–Dresden section, regional trains would operate on the Großenhain–Priestewitz and Leipzig–Dresden lines (western route) and express trains would operate on the Medessen–Böhla and Berlin–Dresden lines (eastern route).

On 28 May 2006, with the last Interregio in Germany from Berlin via Elsterwerda and Riesa to Chemnitz (IR line 34), this type of train was abolished and replaced by Regional-Express and Regionalbahn, e.g. RE 5, RE 3 from 2006, now RE 8 (Stralsund–Elsterwerda) and by the RB 45 (Elsterwerda – Riesa – Chemnitz).

In 2007, the line had a capacity of 144 trains per day per direction. From 2006 to the end of 2010, all long-distance trains ran from Berlin to Dresden without stopping. From 2010 onwards, some Eurocity (EC) stops were introduced again in Elsterwerda, but these were not attractive for travellers to intermediate stations due to poor connection times.

In 2012, the Regionalbahn service from Elsterwerda to Dresden Hbf took 61 minutes, no Regional Express ran and the Eurocity took 37 minutes. Towards the north, the RE from Elsterwerda to Berlin Hbf took 127 minutes and the Eurocity took 89 minutes. In 2012, there were political demands that, in addition to stopping some ECs in Elsterwerda, a few trains should also stop in Doberlug-Kirchhain, especially because of the slow development of the line. Some REs could have run via the Doberlug-Kirchhain Nord connecting curve to Finsterwalde instead of via Elsterwerda.

In 2013, according to Deutsche Bahn, a market volume of around 6,700 trips per day was estimated across all modes of transport between the metropolitan areas of Dresden and Berlin.

In August 2016, the line between Wünsdorf-Waldstadt and Elsterwerda was completely closed in order to upgrade the line to a speed of 200 km/h by removing level crossings and building new tracks.

Since 2019, in addition to the Czech Railways' Eurocitys, an Intercity service has been running every two hours from Rostock via Berlin to Dresden. With scheduled stops in Doberlug-Kirchhain and Elsterwerda, this connects the Elbe-Elster-Land and parts of Lower Lusatia to the two major cities with short travel times. The double-decker multiple unit used for this runs at 160 km/h and also stops at Berlin Brandenburg Airport. In the future, it is planned to accelerate this connection to 200 km/h using new safety technology.

=== Development of travel time ===
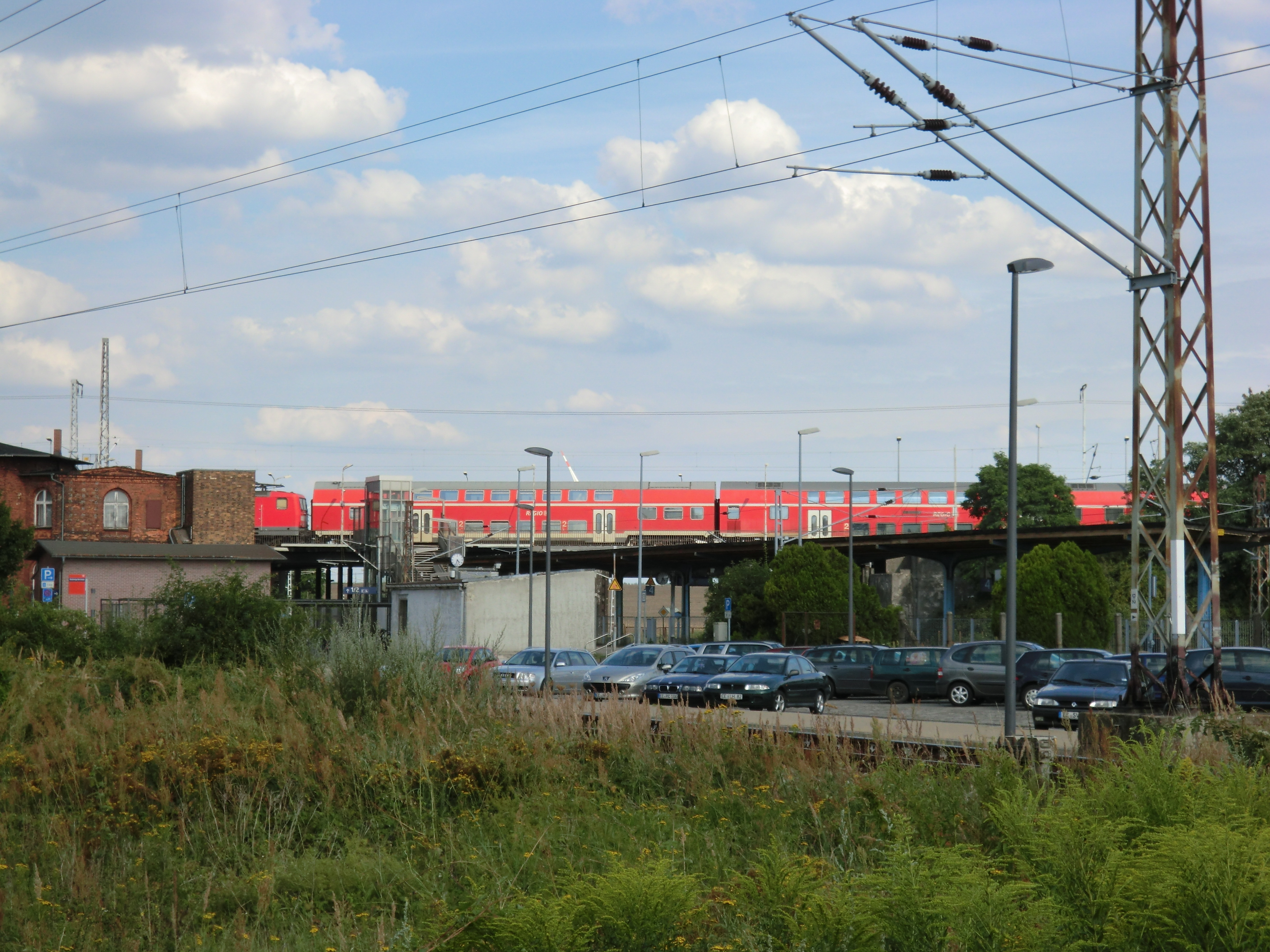
A Stralsund–Elsterwerda RE service in Doberlug-Kirchhain station

The travel time of the Henschel-Wegmann train from 1936 to 1939 (100 minutes in the shortest case) has not yet been reached again, but the Anhalter Bahnhof in Berlin was around 2 km south of today's Hauptbahnhof and therefore a little closer to Dresden. Until 2019, there were scheduled travel times of just under 100 minutes for the section from Berlin-Südkreuz to Dresden-Neustadt.

While the condition of the line enabled travel times of under two hours from 1992 onwards, a journey from Dresden to Berlin took longer until the mid-2010s. There were numerous slow speed zones. In May 2008, only around 45 percent of the Blankenfelde–Neucoswig section used by long-distance traffic was still passable at 160 km/h. At the end of 2011, around a quarter of the Brandenburg section, between Blankenfelde and Elsterwerda, could not even be operated at the speed of 120 km/h intended for regional traffic.

The following table provides an overview of the development of the scheduled travel time in long-distance transport (fastest connection in each case):

Year	Berlin–Dresden (hr:min)	Dresden–Berlin (hr:min)	Berlin station
1905	2:50	2:45	Anhalter Bahnhof
1937–38	1:41	1:40	Anhalter Bahnhof
1939	1:56	1:49	Anhalter Bahnhof
1960	2:32	2:48	Ostbahnhof
1976	1:54	1:55	Ostbahnhof
1988	2:41	2:25	Lichtenberg
1994	1:48	1:50	Ostbahnhof
2005	2:11	2:15	Ostbahnhof
2009	2:18	2:16	Hauptbahnhof
2011	1:58	2:10	Hauptbahnhof
2012	2:07	2:09	Hauptbahnhof
2013	2:06	2:10	Hauptbahnhof
2014	2:04	2:11	Hauptbahnhof
2015	2:03	2:08	Hauptbahnhof
2016	1:58	2:04	Hauptbahnhof
2017	1:52	2:02	Hauptbahnhof
2018	1:48	1:46	Hauptbahnhof
2019	2:08	1:55	Hauptbahnhof
2020	1:50	1:47	Hauptbahnhof
2021	1:50	1:47	Hauptbahnhof
2022	1:51	1:47	Hauptbahnhof
2023	2:06	2:04	Hauptbahnhof
2024	1:50	1:49	Hauptbahnhof
2025	1:51	1:45	Hauptbahnhof
2026	1:39	1:34	Hauptbahnhof
(2029)	(1:17)	(1:17)	(Planung Deutschlandtakt)

Depending on the annual timetable, up to 20 minutes of timetable reserve is included. With the completion of further development stages, the shortest travel time should fall to 102 minutes in December 2020. Further expansion stages are being planned (see below). In the long term, the aim is for a journey time of 90 minutes. Currently (2024 timetable year) there are direct connections between the two major cities every hour during the day with a travel time of around two hours.

For journeys between Berlin and Prague, the use of multi-system locomotives has eliminated the need to change locomotives in Dresden since mid-2018 and the time spent at Dresden Hauptbahnhof has been shortened by 10 minutes.

== Planning and financing after 1990 ==
The Institute for Railway Construction at TU Dresden developed for the State of Saxony, concepts for various new lines in the new federal states in the second half of 1990. A new line was largely planned between Berlin and Dresden. This would have largely followed the existing line to the north of Großenhain and run in a southwesterly direction to the west of Cossebaude in order to be integrated into a planned high-speed line from Leipzig to Dresden. From Dresden a continuation towards Prague was planned.

In 1991, the considerations were further developed. While planning to upgrade the existing line to 200 km/h (120 mph) was already underway, the university continued to recommend a new line.

The upgrade of the line for higher speeds (than the 160 km/h already largely achieved) was listed in the 1992 Federal Transport Infrastructure Plan (Bundesverkehrswegeplan) as a new project with planned total costs of DM 395 million (1 January 1991 prices).

Subsequently, preliminary plans were developed by 1996 to upgrade the line to a length of 148 km (92 mi) for a speed of 200 km/h. Uckro, Elsterwerda and Böhla were to be bypassed and Doberlug-Kirchhain station was to be rebuilt. The costs for this were estimated at DM 2.295 billion (1 January 1993 prices).

Towards the end of these plans, an intergovernmental agreement was concluded on 7 June 1995 to further develop the Berlin–Prague–Vienna railway route. This was already based on a general development of the line for 200 km/h. In the long term, the travel time on the Berlin–Prague section should be reduced to three hours, which would also require the completion of a high-speed line from Dresden to Prague. However, a completion date was not agreed upon.

On 5 June 1997, the transport ministers of Germany, the Czech Republic and Austria reached an agreement to upgrade the Berlin–Prague–Vienna axis.

In October 1997, the Bahnbau Deutsche Einheit planning company was commissioned to plan and implement the development project. For DM 1.6 billion German, 125 km (78 mi) of railway line should be upgraded to a maximum speed of 200 km/h by 2008. The plan included the construction of 45 railway and 15 road bridges, 99 culverts, 435 km (270 mi) of overhead lines and twelve electronic signal boxes. The travel time between the main stations of Berlin and Dresden was supposed to decrease from 111 minutes (1997) to 59 minutes.

In 1998, it was decided to begin development work immediately, which had the character of maintenance and was to be completed in sections without any change in travel time by 2002. An upgrade to 200 km/h would only take place after 2003.

The European Commission awarded a grant of €10 million in 2007 under the TEN program.

On 11 December 2008, a financing agreement was signed for the continuous upgrading for 160 km/h as a continuation of the first stage of development. This would be completed by 2014 and the travel time would be reduced to around 103 minutes after the work was completed.

From the funds of the economic stimulus package I in response to the 2008 financial crisis, the following funds were made available from 2009:

- Track renewal at Doberlug-Kirchhain: €2 million
- Track renewal near Brenitz-Sonnewalde: €10 million
- Complete renovation of the track structure, partial substructure with new construction of all bridges and removal of the level crossing between Weinböhla and Radebeul West (part of VDE 9): €34 million

In 2010, renewed planning became necessary in order to access the available funds and carry out the approved construction work. A cost–benefit analysis in April 2010 determined a benefit-cost ratio of 2.9 for the upgrade project.

In mid-2010, the Federal Ministry of Transport expected that the total investment costs for the line upgrade would be €802 million. The costs are broken down into the different implementation and upgrade stages as follows:

- 1st upgrade stage, 1st implementation stage: €148 million.
- 1st upgrade stage, 2nd implementation stage: €224 million.
- 1st upgrade stage, further implementation stage(s): €213 million.
- 2nd upgrade stage: €217 million.

No financial agreement had been achieved by 2010 for the last two points.

In 2014, EU funding of €30 million was awarded from the European Regional Development Fund (ERDF) for the supra-regional function of the project.

In order to implement the complex tasks required to realise the overall project, DB Netz set up a project that regularly provides information about the activities. For this purpose, the work to be carried out was divided into three main line sections:

- Berlin urban area to Berlin outer ring,
- Berlin outer ring to Böhla,
- Böhla to Dresden city center.

The planned work in the Berlin urban area was legally difficult because the intended use of the former Dresden Railway was locally controversial. The plans were only fully approved in 2019.

The Berlin outer ring section to Böhla runs through predominantly rural areas. The development as a high-speed railway provides little economic benefit in this structurally weak area. After various small projects were funded by Deutsche Bahn, the state and federal level felt compelled to overcome the deadlock by providing special funding to reduce the contributions required from the municipalities. This made complex and fundamental reconstruction possible between 2016 and 2018. Due to deployment problems with the required European Train Control System, the maximum speed of 200 km/h would only be achieved from the end of 2020. The reason given is a version change to version SRS 3.4.0 of the ETCS specification ordered by the EU Commission in 2015. Now, ESTW (computer-based interlocking) and ETCS equipment would not be done in parallel, but one after the other. The section between Berlin Südkreuz and Blankenfelde is to be equipped with ETCS by the end of 2025, and all remaining sections between Blankenfelde and Kottewitz junction are expected to be equipped by 2028. The timing of the installation of ETCS equipment between Kottewitz and Dresden Hauptbahnhof has not been determined.

The Böhla–Neucoswig section near Dresden is part of the German Unity Transport Project (Verkehrsprojekte Deutsche Einheit, VDE) No. 9 to upgrade the Leipzig – Dresden line and is also included in the balance sheet in terms of costs. The Weißig–Böhla connecting curve links the Leipzig–Dresden railway in Böhla with the Berlin–Dresden railway. This means that this section can also be used by fast long-distance and freight traffic from and towards Leipzig. The former regional traffic between Großenhain and Radebeul via Weinböhla has been routed via Priestewitz and Coswig since 2002 and is thus separated from fast long-distance traffic. The Dresden–Friedrichstadt–Radebeul–Naundorf section of the line, which historically belonged to the Berlin-Dresden Railway, is not part of the current upgrade projects as it is predominantly used for freight traffic. For this purpose, together with the VDE 9 project in connection with the upgrade of the Dresden railway junction, the Radebeul – Dresden-Neustadt line was restored to the four-tracks that existed before 1945 with a maximum speed of 160 km/h for the long-distance tracks.

The measures were defined individually for each of these route and project sections, which will create a maximum line speed of 160 km/h as part of upgrade stage 1 and 200 km/h as part of upgrade stage 2.

After completion of all construction measures in upgrade stage 1, including the reactivation of the section in Berlin, the travel time between Berlin Südkreuz and Dresden-Neustadt would be 74 minutes. After completion of the Böhla–Radebeul section as part of VDE 9, the travel time is expected to be shortened by a further five minutes, but this was not foreseeable in 2017 due to the lack of a tunnel south of Böhla.

The extensive expansion of the line to 200 km/h is referred to as upgrade stage 2. According to the new planning from 2010, the first sections of the line with this track quality were completed in 2012, without any impact on driving technology.

As part of the i2030 program, the states of Berlin and Brandenburg, among others, are investigating an extension of the S-Bahn by around five kilometres to Rangsdorf with stations in Dahlewitz, Dahlewitz-Rolls-Royce and Rangsdorf. In April 2020, a financial agreement amounting to around €16 million in state funds was signed for preliminary, draft and approval planning.

== Development ==
=== Restoration of the Dresden Railway in Berlin ===
==== Overview ====
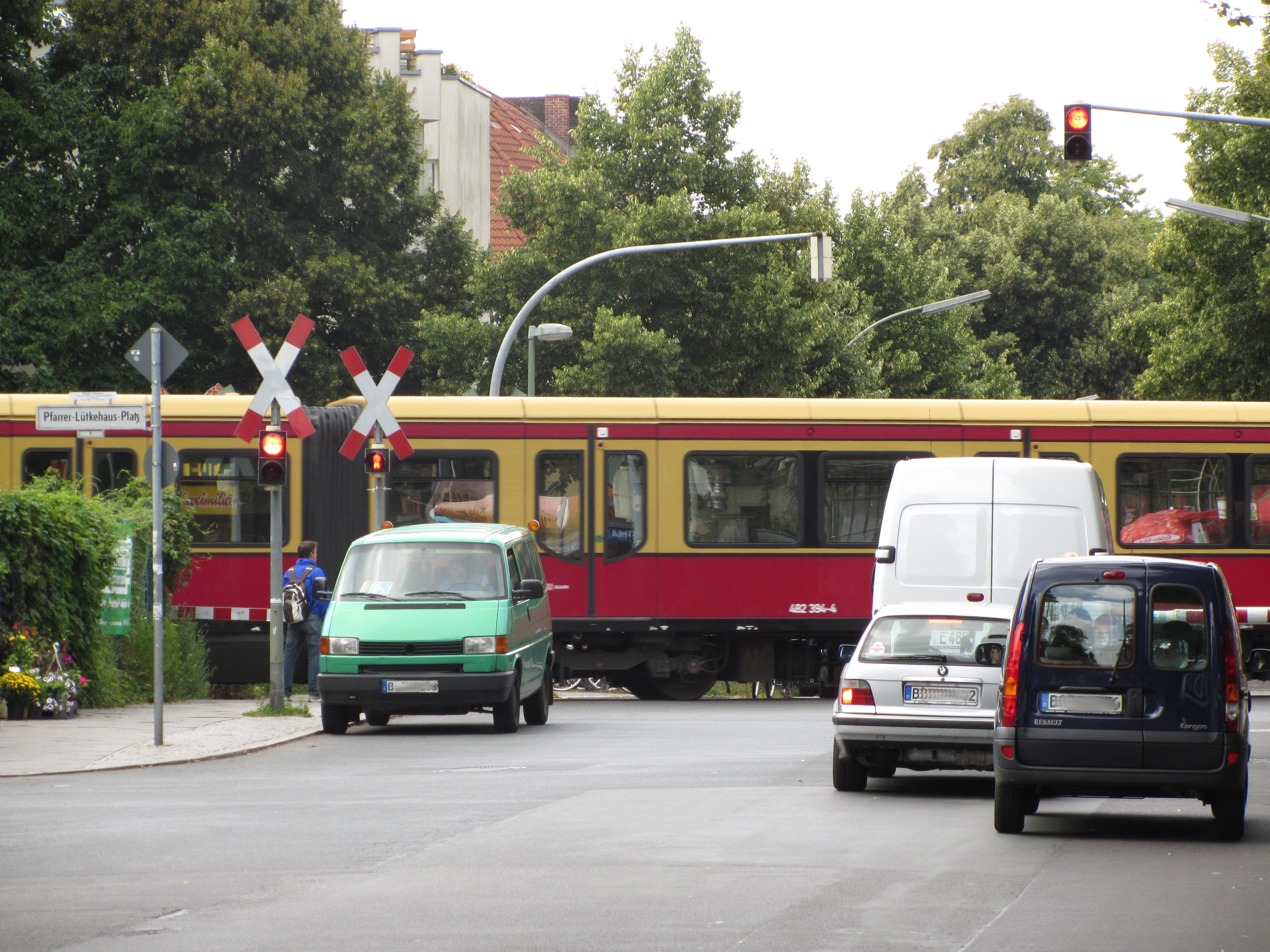
The now abandoned level crossing at Berlin-Lichtenrade station, 2011

Since the end of May 2006, most long-distance and regional trains to the Dresden Railway have been running from Berlin Hauptbahnhof through the Tiergarten Tunnel of the Berlin North–South mainline and meet the old line of the Dresden railway and the Berlin–Halle railway near Gleisdreieck. Until the inner-city line between Berlin Südkreuz station and the southern Berlin outer ring was restored, trains ran via a detour via the Berlin–Halle railway, a connecting curve at Genshagener Heide and the Berlin outer ring to Glasower Damm junction. There the trains rejoined the Dresden Railway at line kilometre 19.0.

Since the upgrade has been completed, the trains switch from the North-South long-distance railway to the Berlin-Dresden railway (line kilometre 5.0) near Priesterweg station without level crossings. The state of Berlin is planning to establish a stop for regional transport at Buckower Chaussee station. However, no specific decision to proceed with the Buckower Chaussee proposal was initially made in order not to further delay the planning approval process. A total of 14 railway bridges are being built, among other things.

The design speed in Berlin's urban area was 160 km/h in 2001. The upgrade of the 14.2 km (8.8 mi) long direct section between Südkreuz station and the southern outer ring (Blankenfelde) is intended to reduce travel time for long-distance passenger trains by around ten minutes. In the final state, a travel time between Berlin and Dresden of 75 minutes would be possible (as of May 2014). The upgrade is also important for connecting Berlin Brandenburg Airport with Airport Express trains. Since the Dresden Railway went into operation in December 2025, the "Airport Express" reaches BER Airport station from the Hauptbahnhof via a new connecting curve to the Berlin outer ring in 22 minutes.

The reconstruction of the section is expected to cost around €558 million. Construction officially began in 2019 and commissioning was at the end of 2025.

==== Planning approval procedure ====
The first planning approval procedure was initiated in 1998 and the last planning approval procedure (PFA 3) was completed in August 2019. The middle section 2 (Berlin-Lichtenrade) was to be approved first, but this was delayed due to legal proceedings (see below). In 2008, the DB accused the Berlin Senate of having delayed the process for implementing structural changes, which began in 1997, for several years. At the end of July 2000, Deutsche Bahn announced that it would postpone the development of the access route in Berlin until further notice in order to save costs.

The planned construction period after completion of the planning approval process was given as "four years" in 2009.

In the meantime, the construction of a second entrance to Marienfelde station was proposed, which DB rejected due to high costs. Another point of contention was a second entrance to Buckower Chaussee station requested by the Senate.

The planned investment cost was stated as €470 million in 2009. In the investment framework plan for federal transport infrastructure from 2006 to 2010, investments amounting to €430 million were planned for the restoration of the Südkreuz–Blankenfelde section. The investment framework plan 2011–2015 gave the cost as €417.2 million.

The reconstruction was divided into four planning approval phases (PFA):

- The PFA 4 (Schöneberg) begins at the exit from the Berlin–Halle railway and extends to Attilastraße station. The exit structure and the subgrade in this section were built at the same time as the reconstruction of the Berlin–Halle railway.
- The PFA 1 (Marienfelde) extends from Südkreuz to Schichauweg station. The report of the hearing process was available at the end of 2012. According to DB information, the submitted plans had to be corrected and then the public authorities would probably have to be heard again. The planning approval decision for the 6.3 km (3.9 mi) long section was issued in May 2017.
- The 2.5 km (1.6 mi) long PFA 2 (Lichtenrade) leads from Schichauweg via Lichtenrade to the state border. At the end of 2012, the Federal Railway Authority began developing the planning approval decision, which was available in November 2015. In this section, the construction of a tunnel instead of an above-ground route was controversial. In its ruling of 29 June 2017, the Federal Administrative Court, as the first and last instance, dismissed all related lawsuits and, in particular, found that the Federal Railway Authority had rightly rejected the idea of relocating the line into a tunnel. This solution, according to the court, is not preferable.
- In May 2013, Deutsche Bahn presented new plans for PFA 3 (Blankenfelde–Mahlow), which extends from the Berlin city limits to Blankenburg. After corrections in 2017, the planning approval decision was issued on 30 August 2019. Two electrified long-distance railway tracks that can be used at speeds of 200 km/h and a connecting curve to BER Airport will be built. The parallel, largely single-track S-Bahn line is being modernised. At Blankenfelde station, the S-Bahn platform will be moved to the south and designed as a combined platform for S-Bahn and regional trains. Five level crossings will be replaced by bridges and noise barriers will be built.

==== Dispute over a tunnel in Lichtenrade ====
While Deutsche Bahn sought planning approval for a surface route in Lichtenrade, residents and the Senate demanded that a tunnel be built. Around 4,000 objections were raised in the proceedings against the surface route. From 1998 onwards, the Berlin Senate also supported Lichtenrad's residents, who at the time included the later Governing Mayor Klaus Wowereit, and interrupted the planning approval process that had just begun for two years. In 2008, several corresponding lawsuits from residents were pending before the Federal Administrative Court. The Berlin-Lichtenrade Dresdner Bahn citizens' initiative was founded in Lichtenrade and was committed to a tunnel solution. The initiative called for a tunnel between Buckower Chaussee and the outskirts of the city; other initiatives wanted a tunnel that was around 1.2 km (0.75 mi) shorter and began at Schichauweg station.

A feasibility study of various tunnel solutions carried out by Deutsche Bahn in 2001 revealed additional costs of at least DM 254 million (equivalent to around €197 million in 2024). These would be even higher now due to increased safety requirements. According to Deutsche Bahn, the federal government would not finance a tunnel solution. The Berlin Senate Administration offered to contribute €30 million towards a tunnel solution. Various tunnel variants developed by Deutsche Bahn were examined by the Federal Railway Authority around 2012. In May 2014, Deutsche Bahn announced that it would wait for a decision from the Federal Railway Authority as to whether an above-ground solution could be approved. In 2015, State Secretary for Transport Christian Gaebler estimated the costs of a ground-level route at €128 million, that of a cut-and-cover tunnel at €223 million, and that of a tunnel with shield driving (as requested by the citizens' initiative) at €360 million. Commissioning would be delayed by eight years, to 2031. While the citizens' initiative wanted to leave the S-Bahn on the surface, the DB expects that it would also have to run in the tunnel.

In August 2015, the Federal Railway Authority decided in favour of the above-ground development sought by Deutsche Bahn. A planning approval decision was issued on 13 November 2015. Lawsuits against the decision were filed by a recognised environmental association and three owners at the Federal Administrative Court (BVerwG) as the first and last instance, as well as an application for interim legal protection. Deutsche Bahn sought immediate completion and announced that it would begin construction work in 2017 if possible. The main hearing took place on 14 and 15 June 2017 in Leipzig. The judgment of the Federal Administrative Court was issued on 29 June 2017 and dismissed the lawsuits. In particular, the Federal Railway Authority rejected the idea of relocating the line into a tunnel without considering any errors in such a proposal. This approach was not clearly a preferable solution.

==== Construction ====
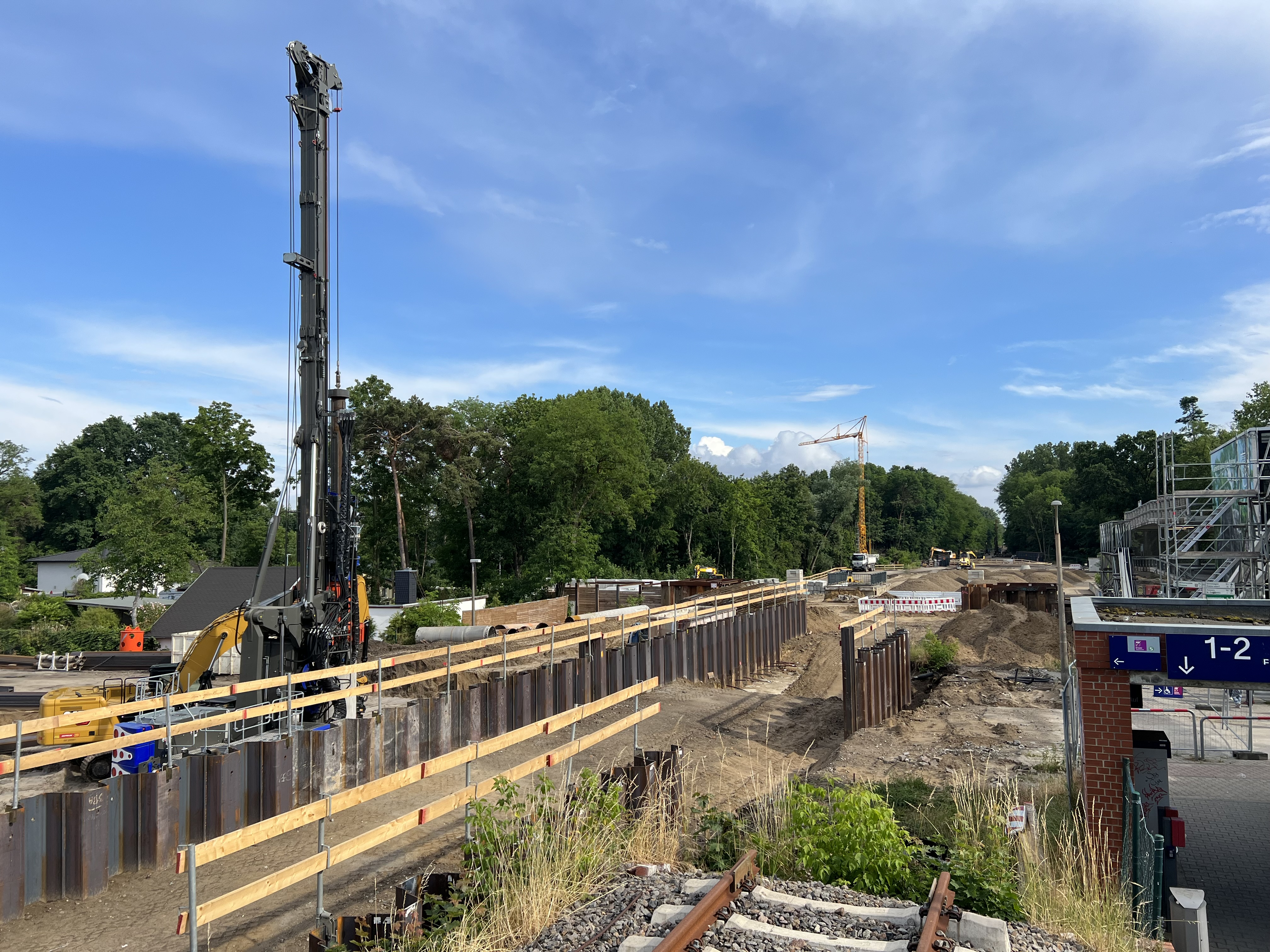
Construction at Blankenfelde station in June 2023

On 20 September 2017, an interactive information point was opened in the former train dispatcher's house at Lichtenrade station, providing information about the construction project. The construction work itself began in October 2017 with preparatory measures, including felling trees between Lichtenrade and the city limits. From November 2017, a temporary pedestrian bridge was built at the Säntisstraße railway crossing. The level crossing was closed on 29 March 2018.

The Marienfelde computer-based interlocking went into operation on 3 April 2018. It controls the track systems, which initially continue to be operated jointly by the S-Bahn and long-distance railways (freight transport). In addition to the new train control system (Zugbeeinflussungssystem S-Bahn Berlin, ZBS), the old Punktförmige Zugbeeinflussung (PZB) train control system is still used. The transition zone extends from Attilastrasse station to Lichtenrade station. In this context, the former Attilastraße halt was converted into a full station and Mariendorf (BMD) junction was closed. On 2 December 2018, the transition zone (including ZBS) was extended to Blankenfelde, while maintaining the PZB on the shared line to Mahlow station.

With the installation of the last element of a noise barrier at the Wolziger Zeile railway crossing in Berlin-Lichtenrade in the presence of the DB Infrastructure Board member, Ronald Pofalla, and the coordinator of TEN projects at the European Union, Mathieu Grosch, on 5 February 2019, construction of the Dresden Railway in the south of Berlin began. The planned total cost at the start of construction were estimated at around €560 million.

The Berlin Hbf to Blankenfelde section went into operation in December 2025. The remainder of the second phase of construction is scheduled to be commissioned in December 2028.

=== Berlin outer ring to Böhla ===
The upgrade of the line between Blankenfelde (near Berlin) to Böhla (near Dresden) is to be carried out in two construction stages over the entire section. The first upgrade stage includes measures that enable a speed of 160 km/h (99 mph) with an option of 200 km/h (120 mph). The tracks, points and engineering structures are to be renewed and the control and safety technology is to be modernised. After completion of the second stage, in which all 35 level crossings will be eliminated, and with the commissioning of ETCS, operations at 200 km/h will be authorised.

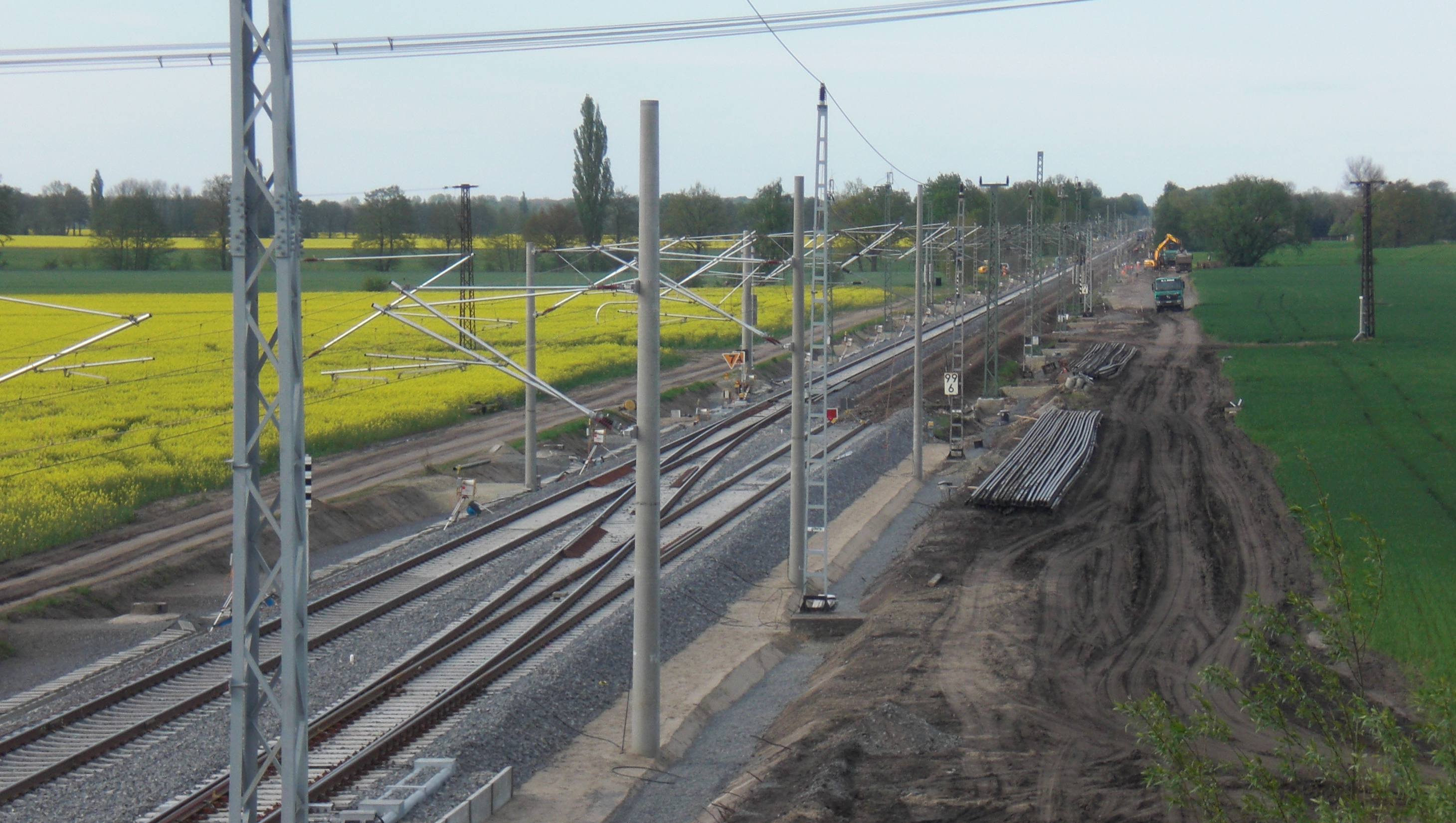
Upgrade of the line to Brenitz, May 2010

Preliminary planning for the upgrade began in 2002. Following a decision by the Mediation Committee of the federal parliament to reduce subsidies in December 2003, numerous new construction and upgrade measures in the transport infrastructure, including those on the Berlin–Dresden railway line, were delayed. The first construction stage was therefore divided into several implementation stages. As part of the first implementation stage, the upgrade would only took place from Doberlug-Kirchhain to around Hohenleipisch and between Wünsdorf and Neuhof with a total length of 21 km (13 mi) by the end of 2006. In 2005, the federal government stopped the work. In April 2007, Deutsche Bahn also listed the further upgrade of the line among the "projects postponed in the medium term". Planning was resumed in 2009. The upgrade of the following section from Doberlug-Kirchhain to Brenitz and Sonnewalde, including signalling and safety technology, took place from the end of 2010 to 2011.

The second implementation stage includes the following project sections:

- Rangsdorf station and construction of the Rangsdorf railway overpass
- Renewal of the north end of Zossen station and the Notte canal railway overpass
- Wünsdorf-Waldstadt station including to Neuhof bei Zossen station exclusively and railway km 43.7 to Golßen exclusively (section railway km 43.7 to Baruth (Mark) station exclusively started in March 2009)
- Hohenleipisch station including up to Elsterwerda station excluding the Elsterwerda-Biehla crossing structure
- Großenhain Berl Bf only to railway km 29.2 near Böhla

From the end of 2011 to the end of 2012, as the third part of the first stage, the section between Neuhof and Baruth was to be upgraded to 200 km/h. According to media reports from 2010, it was not yet possible to predict when the first construction stage would be completed. There was still no concrete schedule for the second construction phase (as of 2010). Construction of the second construction phase would not begin before 2015 (as of February 2009). During the renovation work in the first construction stage, all measures are being carried out to allow a line speed of 200 km/h.

On 28 July 2010, Deutsche Bahn announced that it would reorganise the upgrade of the line. To the extednt that building permits were available, the approximately 80 km (50 mi) long Wünsdorf – Hohenleipisch section was to be upgraded between 2012 and December 2014—with complete closures in sections—for a maximum speed of 200 km/h. To do this, 21 level crossings would have to be removed and this section would have to be equipped with ETCS. The travel time between Berlin and Dresden would be reduced to a maximum of one and a half hours.

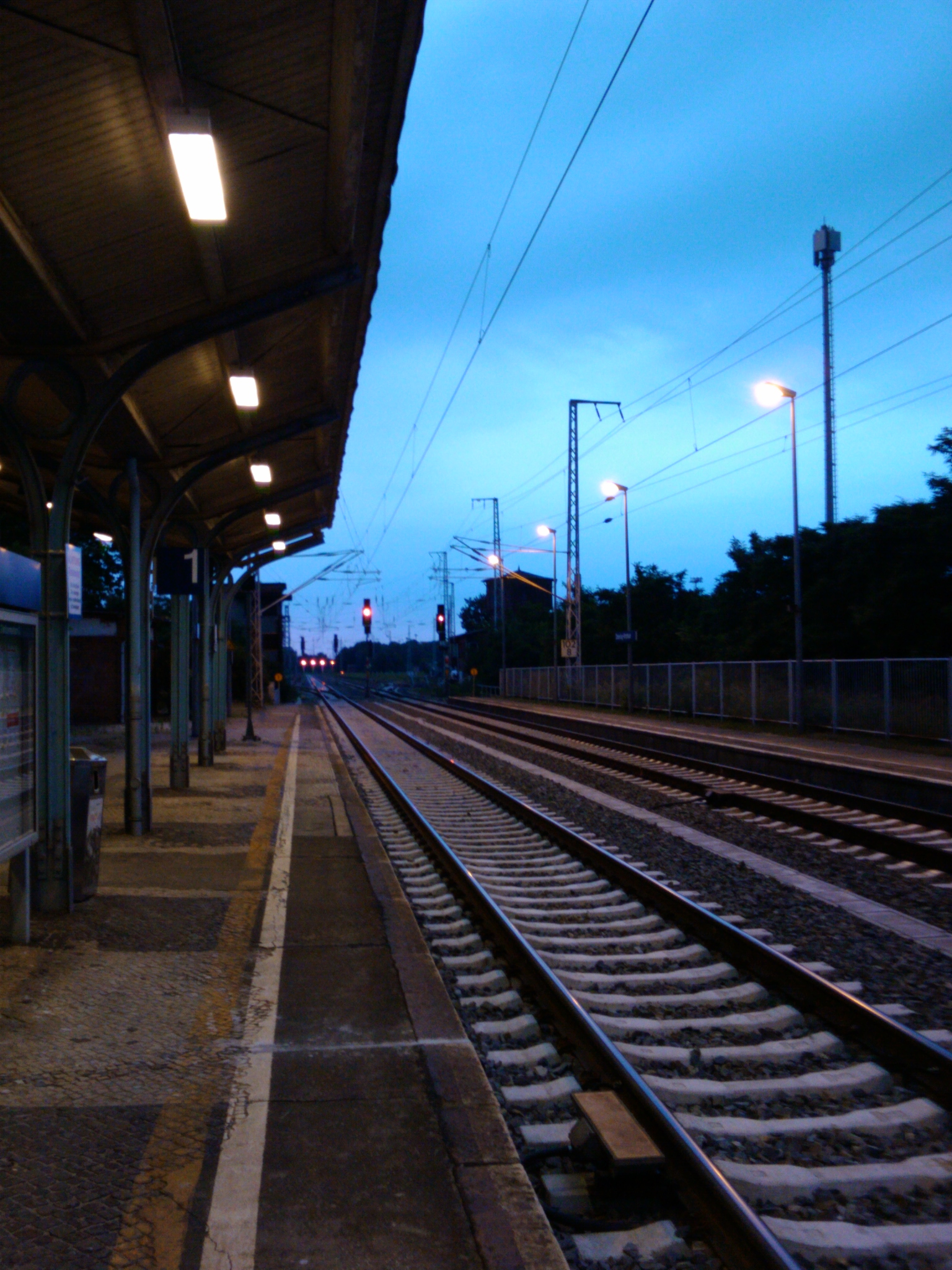
Doberlug-Kirchhain tower station in the direction of Berlin

As of 2012, the Wünsdorf–Neuhof, Uccro–Walddrehna and Brenitz–Hohenleipisch sections were upgraded to 160 km/h with the possibility of operations at 200 km/h.

According to plans from October 2011, the approximately 80 km long Wünsdorf – Elsterwerda section was to be completely closed in 2014 in order to convert all level crossings to make them grade-separated.

In June 2012, it became known that, according to the Federal Ministry of Transport, completion, which was unofficially planned for 2016 at the time, was at risk. Deutsche Bahn did not give a date for completion of the upgrade, but announced that it would submit the planning approval documents for the sections that have not yet been approved by the end of 2012. Deutsche Bahn saw financing problems on the part of the road construction authorities for the removal of around 20 level crossings in Brandenburg. At the end of 2012, agreements under the Railway Crossing Act had been concluded for two level crossings, corresponding agreements were in preparation for 14 others, and 11 further agreements were to be approved by the end of 2013. A crossing agreement was still pending for four other crossings due to a lack of funds. The state of Brandenburg promised to promote the municipal share with unbundling funds. The state of Brandenburg announced in September 2013 that it would assume large parts of the municipalities' own contributions required under the Railway Crossing Act. In Brandenburg, 75 percent of the municipal share of the removal of the 21 level crossings in the 16 affected municipalities is to be paid for from state funds; financially distressed municipalities could receive up to 90 percent. The state of Saxony promised general support, but made no specific commitment. In order to remove a level crossing at Dahlewitz station, the station building there was demolished in spring 2014.

Because there was no building permit, this section was not scheduled to go into operation for 200 km/h before 2016, as of the end of 2012. Deutsche Bahn announced another delay in June 2013, according to which the full closure of the Wünsdorf–Elsterwerda section, originally planned for the 2016 annual timetable, was postponed to 2017. The reason for this was that there were still outstanding crossing agreements to eliminate a total of 21 level crossings in the Brandenburg section. In mid-2013, the upgraded line was scheduled to be put into operation at the end of 2017. At the beginning of September 2013, Deutsche Bahn wanted to discuss with the Federal Railway Authority and the transport ministries of Berlin and Brandenburg how the upgrade could be accelerated. According to DB information from the end of 2013, the upgrade measures for 160 km/h would be completed in 2017 and the travel time would then be shortened by 25 minutes compared to 2013. The majority of the work would take place in Brandenburg; in Saxony, only a line improvement at Großenhain was necessary. At the 2018 timetable change, the travel time between Berlin and Dresden was planned to be reduced by 20 minutes, to one hour and 45 minutes (as of 2015). The further upgrade to 200 km/h, which was to be completed in 2018, would bring savings of another five minutes.

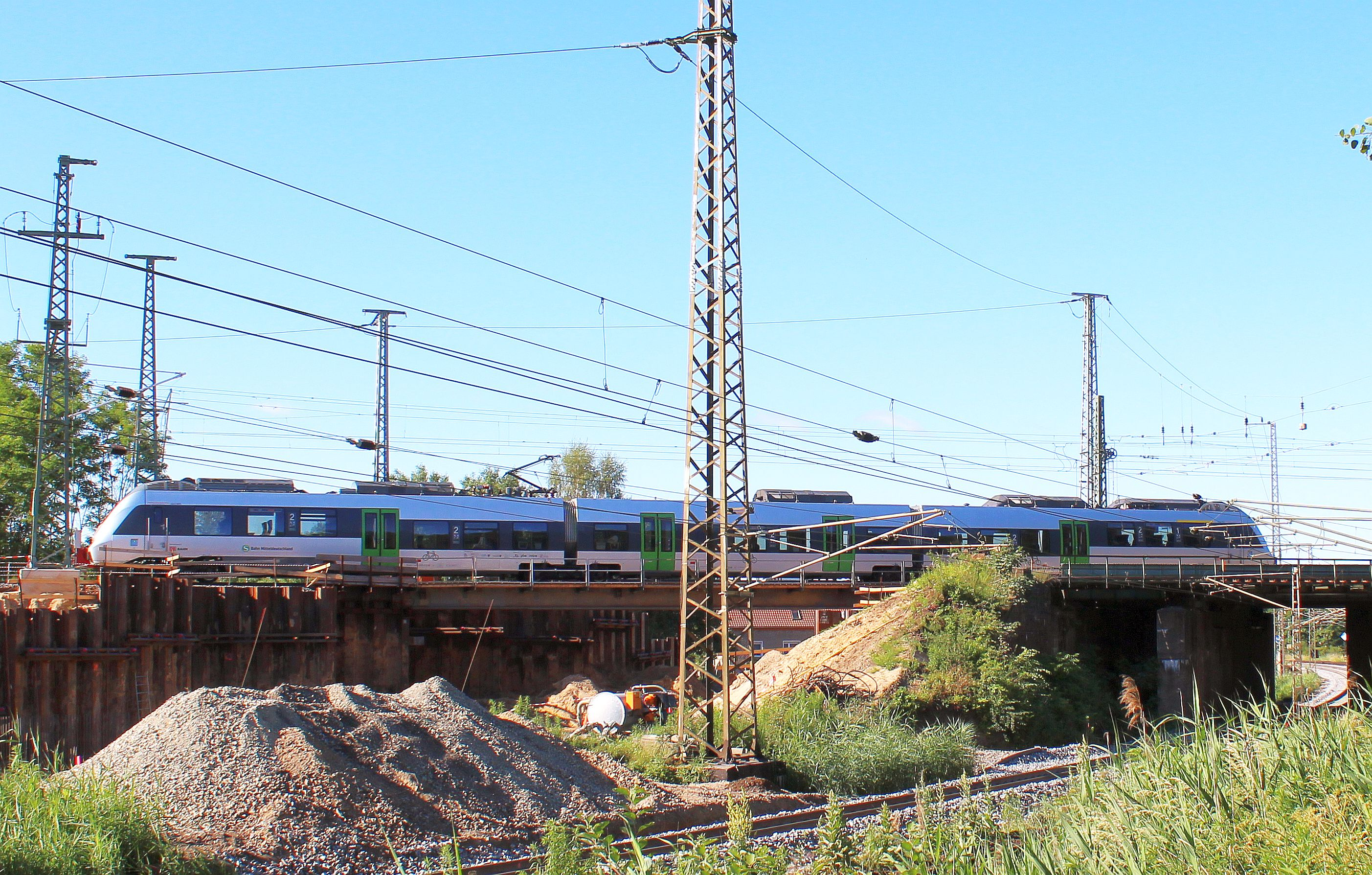
Construction work near the Elsterwerda-Biehla crossing (2014)

According to information from the beginning of 2014, 80 km (50 mi) of 125 km (78 mi) of the upgraded route would be passable at 200 km/h by the end of 2018. This would reduce the scheduled travel time between Berlin and Dresden by 20 to 106 minutes. According to DB information from May 2014, the 125 km long section between the Berlin outer ring and Kottewitz would be completely closed from August 2016. Among other things, nine stations were to be rebuilt, 20 level crossings removed and a European Train Control System installed. The contract award would begin in May 2015. At the end of November 2014, Deutsche Bau advertised the construction work for the reconstruction of the section between Neuhof and Hohenleipisch in the Official Journal of the European Union. The upgraded section between Hohenleipisch and Elsterwerda was scheduled to be put into operation at the end of 2015 for a permissible speed of 160 km/h.

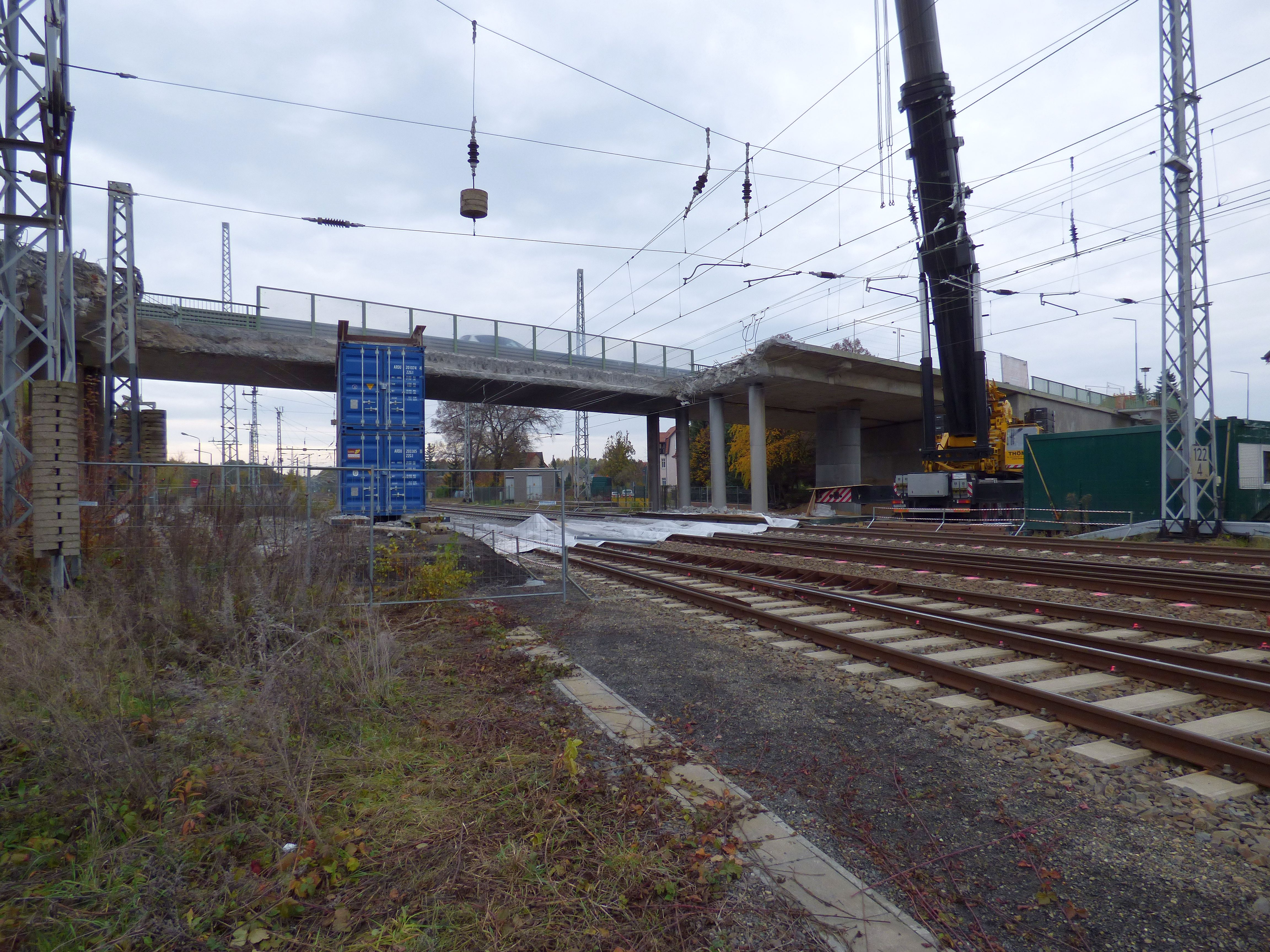
Demolition work in Elsterwerda (2016)

==== Construction of the upgrade to 200 km/h since 2014 ====
From 2013 to 2016, Rangsdorf station was completely rebuilt for €40 million, and Elsterwerda station was rebuilt from mid-2014 to July 2015. Between June 2014 and June 2016, an electronic signal box was built for the Elsterwerda and Hohenleipisch area and the six km (3.7 mi) long section was also rebuilt by the end of 2016.

On 30 May 2016, the formal start of construction (1st construction stage) on the Baruth (Mark) – Hohenleipisch section of the line was celebrated in Baruth in the presence of DB boss Rüdiger Grube, Parliamentary State Secretary Norbert Barthle and Brandenburg's Transport Minister Kathrin Schneider. The 73 km (45 mi) long section between Wünsdorf-Waldstadt and Elsterwerda was upgraded during a full closure of the line that lasted from 5 August 2016 to 9 December 2017. In addition to the renewal of tracks, platforms and railway technology, 18 level crossings were replaced with bridges. After the upgrade is complete, a travel time of 107 minutes should be achieved.

In order to be able to fully close the line for construction projects, long-distance trains in particular were rerouted via the partly single-track Jüterbog–Röderau railway and the Berlin–Halle railway. Despite the longer route, the journey time did not increase due to use of the high-speed sections between Jüterbog and Berlin Südkreuz. In addition, trains were occasionally rerouted via Leipzig (without stopping).

In front of the upgraded route at Zossen and at Doberlug-Kirchhain there were still speed limits of 50 km/h.

With the commissioning of ETCS, travel time would be further reduced. Since 4 December 2020 the section Neuhof (b Zossen) to Rückersdorf (Niederl) has been operable at 200 km/h. However, as there are not yet enough vehicles with ETCS equipment available, a further reduction in travel time has not yet been achieved.

Once all construction work has been completed, the travel time from Berlin to Dresden should be reduced to 69 minutes (as of 2009) and the line between Blankenfelde and a few kilometres from Dresden should be operable at 200 km/h.

From 2020 to 2022, the Wünsdorf-Waldstadt station was rebuilt. Zossen station has been under reconstruction since January 2023. The work is scheduled to be completed in 2025. The 2nd construction stage, comprising the Blankenfelde (exclusive) – Wünsdorf-Waldstadt (exclusive) section and the Doberlug-Kirchhain station and Elsterwerda – Großenhain Berliner Bahnhof section, is planned to be completed by 2028.

From the mid-2020s, a travel time of 80 minutes is planned (as of 2016). With the construction of the Kockelsberg Tunnel, a travel time of 78 minutes would be possible (as of 2020). For cost reasons, the Gehren bend (160 km/h) and the Hohenleipisch–Elsterwerda section (160 km/h) have been excluded. The line is not included in the Federal Railway Authority's ETCS national implementation plan, so there has been no prioritised increase in the maximum speed as a result of implementing ETCS Level 2 even after 2023. The Doberlug-Kirchhain area (140 km/h (87 mph)) should also be accessible at 200 km/h at a later date, after a bridge has been replaced.

The state of Saxony submitted the Berlin-Dresden upgrade and a connecting new line towards Prague for the 2030 Federal Transport Infrastructure Plan.

=== Böhla to Dresden ===
As part of the sections assigned to the Leipzig–Dresden upgraded line, initial construction work began in 2008 on the Weißig–Böhla connecting curve. This line connects with the Berlin – Dresden line at a grade-separated crossing and went into operation in December 2010.

The further upgrade sections between Böhla–Weinböhla and Weinböhla station were originally supposed to be completed by 2016, but had not yet started (as of 2022). One component of this is the Kockelsberg Tunnel, which has been under consideration since the 1990s and has been part of the planning since 2020. At the timetable change on 15 December 2002, Weinböhla station on the line to Berlin was closed and a station of the same name was opened on the line to Leipzig.

As part of the economic stimulus package I, the Weinböhla – Neucoswig and Neucoswig – Radebeul West sections were modernised in 2010. As a result, the line between Neucoswig and Großenhain was closed for a year after the timetable change in December 2009. The six kilometre long section between Neucoswig and Weinböhla was completely rebuilt. In the area of the crossing structure of the former Az signal box up to the area of Radebeul-Zitzschewig station, bridges were replaced between the beginning of 2018 and mid-2020 and curve radii were increased.

== Route description ==
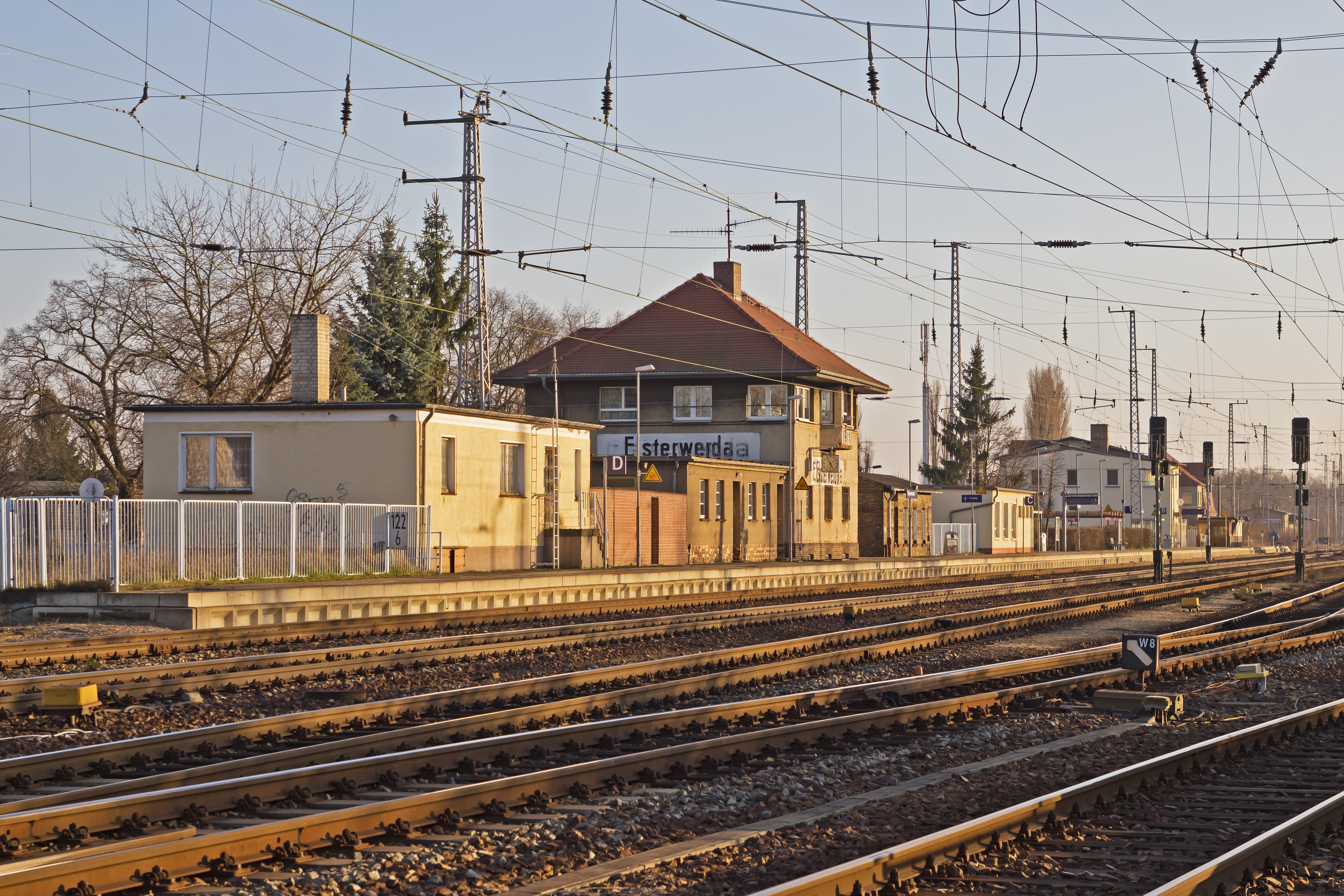
Elsterwerda station

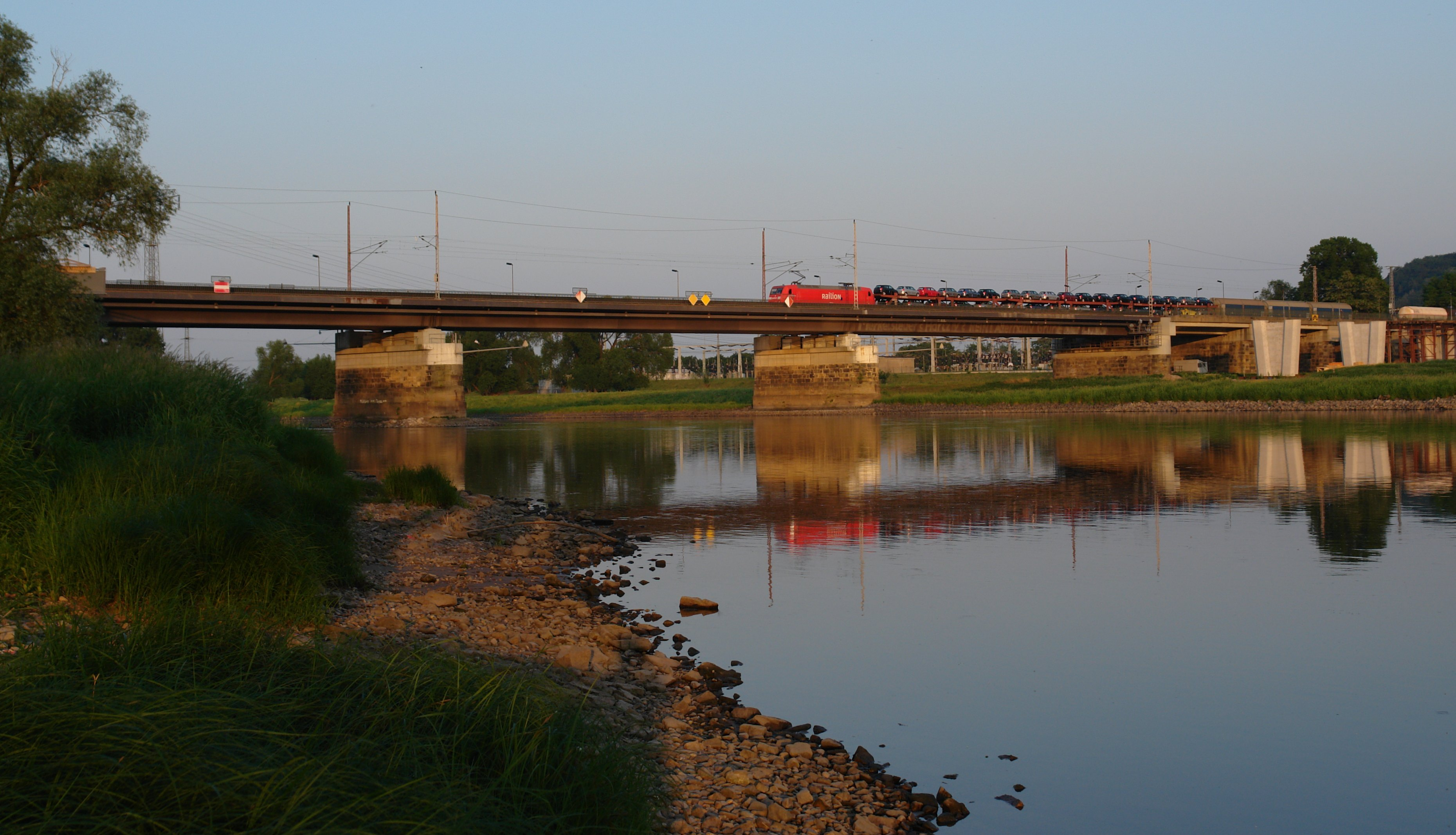
Niederwartha railway bridge over the Elbe

The comparatively flat topography meant that only a few engineering structures were necessary, and the line has a slight incline. It runs from Berlin Südkreuz station in a southerly direction through the urban area of Berlin, leaving it after Lichtenrade. After Mahlow S-Bahn station, the line crosses the Berlin outer ring and it continues south. The S-Bahn ends at Blankenfelde. Only the long-distance tracks run to the south. The line crosses A 10 (Berliner Ring) after Dahlewitz and the outskirts of Berlin at Rangsdorf. After Zossen, where a now closed line branches off towards Jüterbog, the railway crosses the Notte canal. The line runs through the Wünsdorf lakes area and through extensive forest landscapes. Baruth station is located at the transition from the Fläming Heath to the Glogau-Baruth glacial valley. Lower Lusatia is reached near Golßen. At Uckro, the line crosses the closed Falkenberg–Beeskow railway and passes through two curves through the Gehren hills before continuing through the forests of Lower Lusatia to the Doberlug-Kirchhain two-level station. The Halle–Cottbus railway is crossed here. From there it runs past the Bad Erna recreational lakes and from Rückersdorf through a wooded area towards Hohenleipisch station, located on a curve, and on to Elsterwerda.

The industrial town of Elsterwerda, which is also a medium-sized railway junction, lies in a valley of the Black Elster. Several line branch off from the station towards Hoyerswerda, Riesa and Falkenberg. The line crosses two rivers, the Black Elster and the Pulsnitz, shortly after the station. This is also the transition into the Großenhainer Pflege landscape. The line crosses the railway to Priestewitz and Cottbus in the urban area of Großenhain. The Weißig–Böhla connecting curve north of Böhla integrates fast long-distance traffic to/from the Leipzig–Dresden railway. After Böhla, the line reaches the northern edge of the Elbe basin and descends on a relatively winding route to the former Weinböhla station. From Böhla, the Leipzig–Dresden and Berlin–Dresden lines run almost parallel, with both lines crossing each other west of Radebeul. Double-track connecting curves link the lines together and enable the transition from Berlin towards Dresden-Neustadt and from Leipzig towards Dresden-Friedrichstadt and in the opposite direction.

The Elbe is crossed over a long steel bridge at Niederwartha before continuing along the left bank of the Elbe past the pumped storage plant to Dresden-Friedrichstadt station. The Berlin–Dresden line has its nominal end point at Dresden-Friedrichstadt station. Two connecting curves create a connection to the Děčín–Dresden-Neustadt railway and enable train journeys towards Dresden-Neustadt on the one hand and towards Dresden Hauptbahnhof and Dresden-Plauen on the other.

== Train operations ==
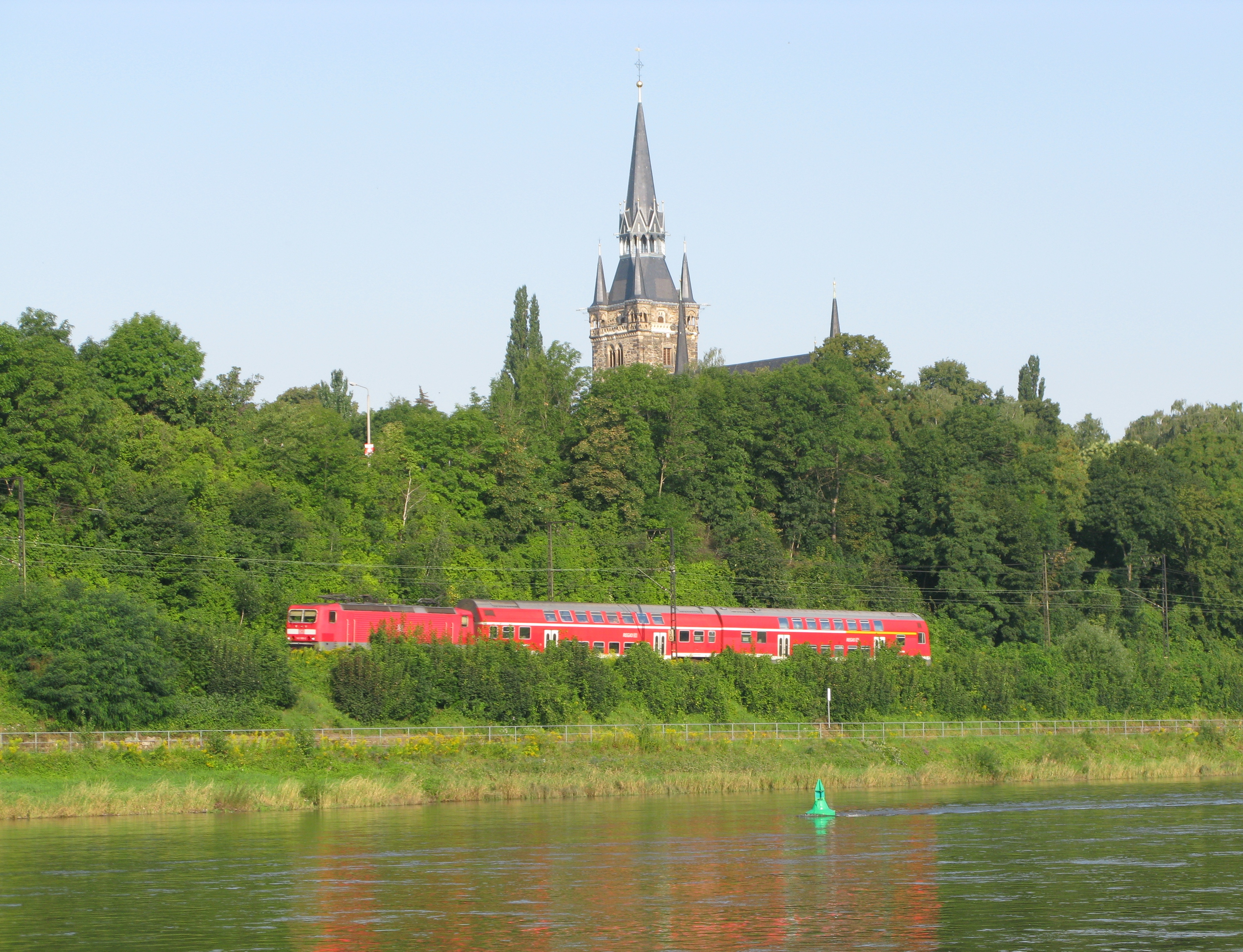
Regionalbahn train in the Dresden city area on the Berlin-Dresden railway line on the left bank of the Elbe, with the Briesnitz church in the background

Between Großenhain Berliner Bahnhof and Radebeul-Naundorf, regional traffic does not run on the Berlin–Dresden railway, but rather on the Großenhain–Priestewitz railway, which runs almost parallel, and the line from Leipzig (Leipzig–Dresden railway).

The following table shows the long-distance and regional transport lines that run on the Berlin–Dresden route (as of 2026):

Line	Route	Line section	Frequency (min)
IC 17	(Warnemünde –) Rostock – Neustrelitz – Berlin-Gesundbrunnen – Berlin Hbf (low) – Berlin Südkreuz – BER Airport – Doberlug-Kirchhain – Elsterwerda – Dresden-Neustadt – Dresden Hbf (– Freiberg – Chemnitz (2 train pairs))	Berlin Südkreuz – Neucoswig	120
RJ 27	(Hamburg-Altona / Westerland – Hamburg Hbf –) Berlin Hbf (low) – Dresden-Neustadt – Dresden Hbf – Decin – (Prague (– Bratislava – Budapest))	Berlin Südkreuz – Neucoswig	120
ICE 27	Berlin Hbf (low) – Dresden Hbf – Prague – Brno – Vienna – Graz	Berlin Südkreuz – Neucoswig	1 train pair
RE 8	Wismar – Schwerin – Ludwigslust – Berlin-Spandau – Berlin Hbf (low) – Berlin Südkreuz – Wünsdorf-Waldstadt – Elsterwerda	Berlin Südkreuz – Elsterwerda	120 (60)
RB 24	Eberswalde – Bernau – Berlin-Lichtenberg – Berlin Ostkreuz – Berlin-Schöneweide – BER Airport – Blankenfelde – Dahlewitz – Rangsdorf – Dabendorf – Zossen – Wünsdorf-Waldstadt	Blankenfelde – Wünsdorf-Waldstadt	60
RB 31	Elsterwerda-Biehla – Elsterwerda – Großenhain Cottb Bf – Dresden Hbf	Elsterwerda – Großenhain / Radebeul-Naundorf – Dresden	120
S 2	Bernau – Berlin Friedrichstraße – Blankenfelde	Berlin-Südkreuz – Blankenfelde	20 (10)

In addition, several other trains use the route, including special trains.

Like the RE trains, the IC/EC trains run to Berlin-Südkreuz and thus through the Tiergarten Tunnel to Berlin Hbf.

=== Operation under ETCS ===
In December 2020, a first section of the route with ETCS was put into operation between Neuhof (b Zossen) and Rückersdorf (Niederl). This equipment remains unused for the time being on long-distance transport services (Railjet, Intercity and Eurocity). Vehicles without ETCS equipment (under Baseline 3) continue to operate under PZB 90 protection at a maximum speed of 160 km/h (99 mph).

From 2021, test runs with Intercity 2 trains (Stadler KISS), which have been in use since 2019, were planned and were to be used commercially with ETCS on the line from 2022. From summer 2022, KISS multiple units in the Hohenleipisch–Baruth section were to run with ETCS and up to 200 km/h (120 mph) over the line. From 2024, international trains with ETCS will also run on the route.

In 2025, when operations begin on the newly built Berlin-Südkreuz – Blankenfelde long-distance line, ETCS Level 2 will also go into operation in addition to PZB and conventional signals. In the long term, the whole line is to be equipped with ETCS.

== Sources ==
- Bley, Peter (1993). Berlin S-Bahn (in German). Düsseldorf: publication Alba. p. 26.
- Bley, Peter (1999). 125 Jahre Berlin–Dresdener Eisenbahn (125 years of the Berlin-Dresden railway) (in German). Düsseldorf: Alba Publikation. ISBN 3-87094-360-2.
- Kaiß, Kurt; Hengst, Matthias (1994). Dresdens Eisenbahn (Dresden Railway): 1894–1994 (in German). Düsseldorf: Alba Publikation. ISBN 3-87094-350-5.
- "Dresdener Bahn" (in German). beefland.
