= Thomas Halaczinsky =

German filmmaker and producer

- Born: 3 October 1958 (age 68); Germany
- Occupations: Filmmaker, producer, photographer
- Website: https://www.thomashalaczinsky.com/

Thomas Halaczinsky is a filmmaker, producer, photographer, and writer. He is the youngest child of composer and painter Rudolf Halaczinsky.

== Early life and education ==
He grew up in Germany and came to New York City in 1991.

== Career ==
Halaczinsky was first credited as the producer of the 1996 feature film "Facing the Forrest", (German title: "Angesichts der Wälder" a feature film based on a short story by Avraham B. Yehoshua directed by acclaimed German director Peter Lilienthal.

As a documental filmmaker, Halaczinsky earned his first critical acclaim as an associate producer for Calling the Ghosts (1996), for which in 1997 he won an ACE award for International Informational Special or Series. The documentary details the experience of Nusreta Sivac and Jadranka Cigelj at the Bosnian Serb-run Omarska camp in Bosnia and Herzegovina during the Bosnian War.

In 2004, his film "Don't Call it Heimweh" about Holocaust survivor Margot Friedländer premiered at the Woodstock Film Festival. In 2005, it was chosen as the opening film at the Jewish Film Festival in Berlin. The film also got attention by American psychoanalyst Roger Frie, who cites Halaczinsky's view in an essay in "Psychoanalytic Psychology" in 2012. Halaczinsky revisited the film's subject and protagonist a couple of years later, resulting in the follow-up documentary "A long Way home" (2010), which the international broadcaster Deutsche Welle first aired in 2010, simultaneously in German, English, Spanish and Arabic. In 2021 he directed together with Sabine Scharnagl a third documentary "Arrived - Margot Friedlander, Berlin" that chronicles Friedlander's life in Berlin since she had moved there in 2011. The film was commissioned by ARD broadcaster Bayrischer Rundfunk and is available at ARD Mediathek. It was also broadcast worldwide by Deutsche Welle and is available in various languages online.

Since the late 2000s, Halaczinsky's focus has turned to New York City's waterfront and New York's island world. He produced and co-directed (with Sebastian Lemke) the documentary "Coney Island - A Last Summer" for European television as a co-production of ZDF and arte in 2008. After hurricane Sandy had hit the New York/New Jersey area in October 2012, he produced and directed the short documentary "Sandy's Hidden Damage".

Shortly after that, Halaczinsky began exploring the waters around New York City by sailboat, photographing and documenting the stories of the islands of New York along his journey. One of the results was the photo series "Archipelago New York", which won an honorable mention at Tokyo International Foto Awards in 2016. A video installation about this exploration was featured at the international exhibition “Bitteres Wasser” at Galerie im Hafen Rummelsburg in Berlin.

While sailing the New York island world following the route of historical Dutch explorer Adriaen Block, Halaczinsky also wrote about his search for a sense of place. Combining his photos with his writing, he created the book "Archipelago New York", which was picked up by Schiffer Publishing and was published in 2018.

In 2021 Halaczinsky directed a three part documentary series commissioned by German broadcaster ZDF in coproduction with European network ARTE "Archipelago New York"(Original German Title: Inselwelt New York) Part 1 of the series premiered at the 19th International Ocean Film Festival in San Francisco. "Archipelago New York - An Island City" won several awards in international film festivals, amongst them "Best Science Film" at the Blue Water Film Festival in San Diego, 2022 and an Excellent Award at the Nature without Borders - International Film Festival 2022.

== Personal life ==
Halaczinsky is married to journalist Petrina Engelke.
