= Nusreta Sivac =

Bosnian activist

- Born: 18 February 1951 (age 75); Prijedor, SR Bosnia and Herzegovina, SFR Yugoslavia
- Occupation: Activist
- Years active: 1992–present
- Organization(s): Women's Association of Bosnia and Herzegovina

Nusreta Sivac (born 18 February 1951) is a Bosnian activist for victims of rape and other war crimes and a former judge. During the Bosnian War she was an inmate at the Bosnian Serb-run Omarska camp in Prijedor, Bosnia and Herzegovina where she and other women at the camp were raped, beaten, and tortured. After the camp's closure in August 1992 due to press coverage, she became an activist for victims of rape and is credited with helping in the recognition of wartime rape as a war crime under international law. She is a member of the Women's Association of Bosnia and Herzegovina.

== Early life ==
Nusreta Sivac was born on 18 February 1951 in Prijedor, SR Bosnia and Herzegovina, SFR Yugoslavia where she finished high school and then studied law. She worked as a judge from 1978 until 1992 when the Bosnian War broke out.

== Bosnian War ==
In April 1992, she was told by Bosnian Serb soldiers that she was no longer employed at the Prijedor Municipality Court. Bosniaks and Croats in Prijedor were forced to wear white armbands and had to hang white flags by their houses' windows. They had their houses looted and burned while they were transported to the Keraterm, Omarska, and Trnopolje concentration camps. Two months after the Bosnian Serb-formed Army of Republika Srpska took control of Prijedor, she was requested to appear at the local police station under the pretense that it was for questioning; however upon arrival she and 25 other women were taken to the Omarska camp. She was amongst 36 other women and 3,500 men that were imprisoned there.

For three months, she and other women at the camp were raped, beaten, and tortured. She recalled that "the worst were the nights for women, because the guards would come to the rooms and take us somewhere in the camp and rape. That happened on a regular basis." During her time there she had to remove blood from the interrogation room. She noted that "we would see them on the grass in front of the 'white house' [...] where the worst torture was committed. The killed men would be placed in the trucks and they would be taken somewhere. In Omarska, persons were dying mostly of torture."

In early August 1992, the camp was visited by the Red Cross and members of the European press coverage, and it was closed immediately after. Five women did not survive the camp. Sivac stated that "four of them were later found in a mass grave and one is still missing." No memorial exists for the camp's victims while schools in Prijedor had commemorated the opening day of the nearby Trnopolje camp. Since then 56 mass graves and corpses in 357 different locations in the Prijedor region have been discovered.

== Activism ==
"The courage these women have shown coming forward and sharing their stories demonstrates the need to break the silence and stigma surrounding sexual violence in conflict ... These survivors are helping to end impunity by making sure perpetrators are brought to justice."

— Zainab Hawa Bangura, UN Special Representative on Sexual Violence in Conflict

That year Sivac escaped to neighboring Croatia where she and fellow inmate Jadranka Cigelj started to gather testimonies from hundreds of rape victims. She also joined the Women's Association of Bosnia and Herzegovina headquartered in Zagreb. In June 1995, they helped in preparing the first indictment of the International Criminal Tribunal for the former Yugoslavia (ICTY). The accumulated evidence unearthed the severity of wartime rape and is considered by the United Nations (UN) as a large "turning point" in helping recognize it as a war crime. She went on to personally testify at the ICTY and helped imprison the man who repeatedly raped her at Omarska. She also testified in many other cases including in that of Radovan Karadžić, Bosnian Serb president of Republika Srpska. 30 individuals were convicted by the ICTY for rape with another 30 cases in progress as of March 2013.

In 1997, she and Cigelj were featured in Calling the Ghosts: A Story About Rape, War and Women, an Emmy-award-winning documentary film by Mandy Jacobson and Karmen Jelincic that detailed their experience at Omarska camp. The film's premiere was sponsored by Amnesty International, the Coalition for International Justice, the Center for Human Rights and Humanitarian law, and the Bosnian branch of Women for Women International.

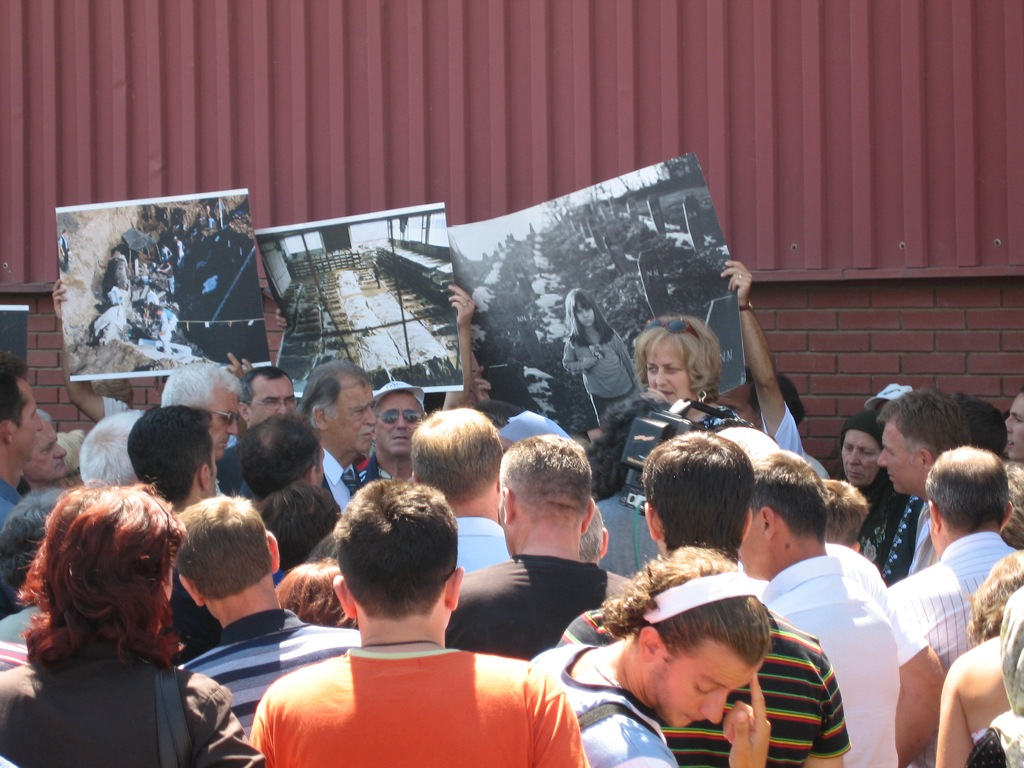
Nusreta Sivac speaking at the 2006 Omarska camp commemoration

In 1999, Sivac returned to Prijedor. In 2000, the United States District Court for the Southern District of New York ordered $745 million in compensation from Karadžić to Sivac, Cigelj, and nine other women. In the summer of 2002, Sivac reclaimed and repurchased the apartment that she had been forced out of during the war. It had been occupied and her possessions there looted by a former colleague. After her return, the word "Omarska" was repeatedly painted by her apartment. Sivac was unable to regain the job she had prior to the war. In 2003, Sivac and over 100 other survivors and relatives of victims of the Omarska camp held a commemoration ceremony for the first time. In 2005, she was among 1,000 women that were nominated for the Nobel Peace Prize. In 2008, she supported the possibility of a regional court for war crimes, saying that "there are some obstacles that truly should be eliminated because constitutions of the states in the region do not allow for extradition, etc. The local judiciary should be trained more, more numerous, of course, should have more executives and judges."

In 2012, she commented on the denial of crimes in Prijedor: "Current Serb authorities in Prijedor are constantly trying to erase the part of history between 1992 and 1995 and ensure that it isn't written about or spoken about. That hurts us the most. That part of history belongs to us, the citizens of Prijedor, and we can never forget nor are we allowed to because of the civilians who were killed here." She said that she carries "emotions, emotions and sadness for all those friends of mine who are no longer here and were killed just because they had different names. It is incomprehensible that in Prijedor, the town where we lived together, that that kind of crime could occur."

== See also ==
- Rape in the Bosnian War
