= Calling the Ghosts =

- Directed by: Mandy Jacobson; Karmen Jelincic
- Written by: Christopher Grimm
- Produced by: Mandy Jacobson
- Starring: Nusreta Sivac; Jadranka Cigelj
- Distributed by: Women Make Movies
- Release date: March 3, 1997
- Running time: 63 minutes
- Country: United States

Calling the Ghosts: A Story about Rape, War and Women is a 1997 documentary film that details the experience of Nusreta Sivac and Jadranka Cigelj at the Bosnian Serb-run Omarska camp in Bosnia and Herzegovina during the Bosnian War. The film's premiere was sponsored by Amnesty International, the Coalition for International Justice, the Center for Human Rights and Humanitarian law, and the Bosnian branch of Women for Women International.

== See also ==
- Rape in the Bosnian War
