= Margot Friedländer =

German Holocaust survivor and public speaker (1921–2025)

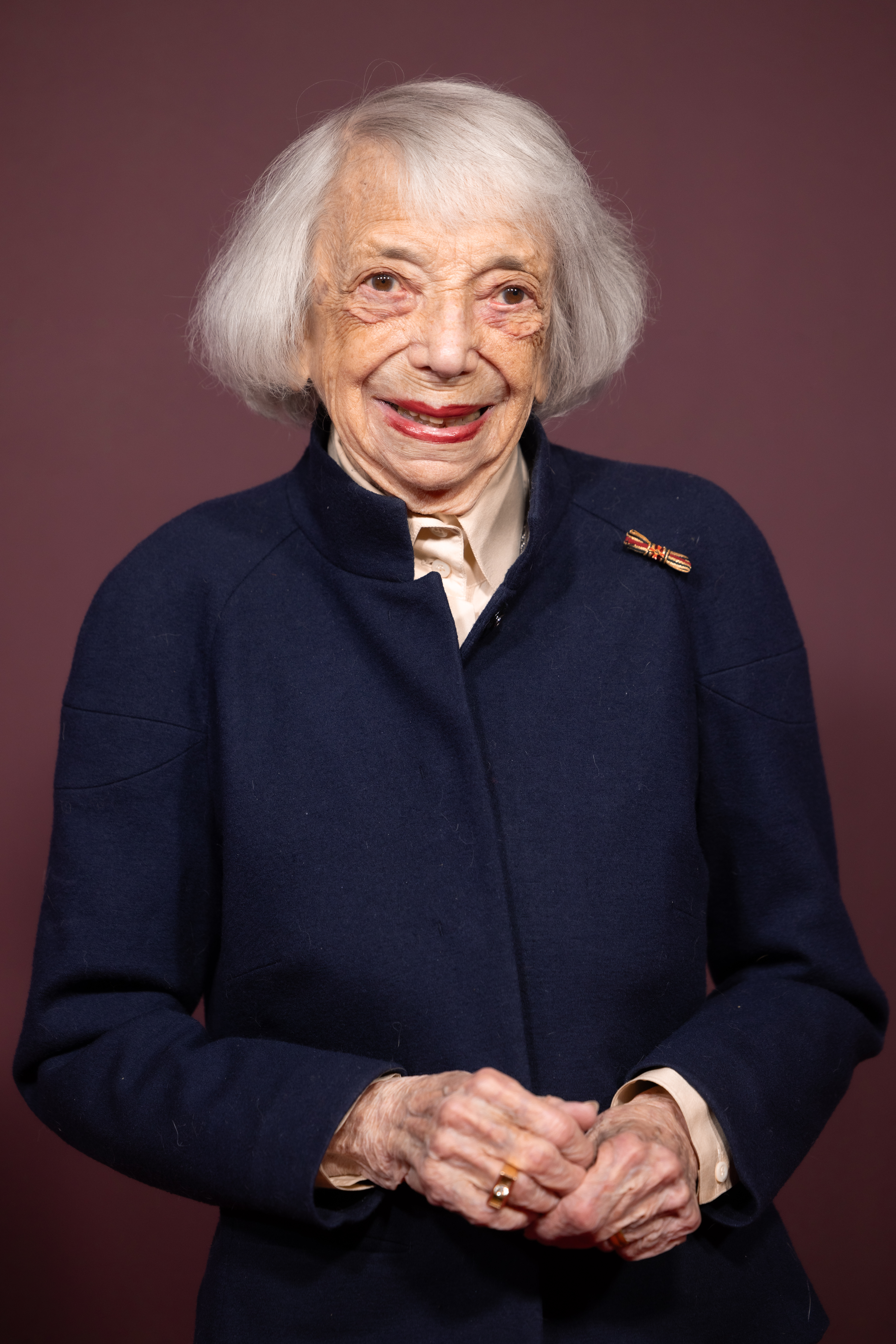
- Friedländer in 2025
- Born: Anni Margot Bendheim; 5 November 1921; Berlin, Germany
- Died: 9 May 2025 (aged 103); Berlin, Germany
- Known for: Holocaust survivor
- Spouse: Adolf Friedländer (m. 1945; died 1997)
- Honours: Federal Cross of Merit

Anni Margot Friedländer (née Bendheim; 5 November 1921 – 9 May 2025) was a German Holocaust survivor and public speaker.

Born and raised in Berlin, she was forced to go into hiding when her mother and brother were arrested by the Gestapo in 1943. Margot was captured in April 1944 and deported to Theresienstadt concentration camp, bu survived. After emigrating to the United States with her husband in 1946, she eventually returned to live in Berlin in 2010 and began speaking to German youth about her experiences in Nazi Germany and surviving against all odds. She received various honours and awards for promoting human rights and fighting against antisemitism, including the Federal Cross of Merit.

== Early life ==
Friedländer was born Anni Margot Bendheim in Berlin on 5 November 1921 and raised on Lindenstraße in the Kreuzberg district. Her family owned a button factory that supplied to local fashion studios in the Jewish textile quarter. When she was 11 years old, the Nazis came to power. She enrolled at an arts and crafts school in Berlin in 1936, and trained to be a fashion illustrator. She worked as a seamstress and at the Deuta factory on Oranienstraße and wanted to design clothes.

By 1938, the increasing persecution of Jews forced many to flee or go into hiding. In 1938, at the age of 17, Friedländer witnessed the pogrom against Jewish shops and synagogues. Her mother was keen to emigrate, but her father, who was a war veteran, would not leave the country. Other sources claim that her father emigrated to Belgium soon after her parents divorced and before the war began.

== Persecution by the Nazis ==
After her parents divorced, Friedländer and her brother Ralph remained with their mother, Auguste Bendheim. Her mother had made several failed attempts to emigrate.

On 20 January 1943, Friedländer was returning home when she noticed a man standing outside the door of the family's apartment on the second floor. She could not leave, so she hid her Jewish star and walked past him, continuing instead to a neighbour's apartment on the third floor. The neighbour confirmed that the Gestapo had visited and arrested 17-year-old Ralph. Friedländer's mother had not been in the apartment at the time, and fled to a Jewish couple in Kreuzberg who were her friends, later turning herself in to the Gestapo in order to protect her son. Friedländer learned of their fate at the couple's home, where she was given her mother's handbag, which contained an address book and an amber necklace. She also received a verbal message from her mother: "Versuche, dein Leben zu machen" (Try to make your life). Friedländer stated, "These words shaped my life."

In January 1943, her mother and brother were taken to Auschwitz concentration camp, where they were murdered. Friedländer's father was also murdered at Auschwitz. Friedländer did not discover what had happened to her family until decades later.

Friedländer continued to live alone in hiding in Berlin. She often moved hiding places after dark due to Allied air raids and was aided by an underground network of 16 unnamed Germans. She survived by living under a false identity that involved dyeing her hair red and removing her Jewish star from her coat. She wore a cross on a chain, and a doctor operated on her nose to alter her appearance. Eventually she was betrayed by Jewish Greifer (lit. 'grabbers'), who were Jews that revealed those in hiding to the Nazis. In April 1944, she was leaving a bomb shelter when two police officers checked her identity. She was taken to a police station and on the way admitted that she was Jewish.

=== Theresienstadt concentration camp ===
Friedländer was transported to Theresienstadt camp located in the present-day Czech Republic. She described life in the camp as "cruel" and only survived because she arrived near the end of the war. There she met her future husband, Adolf Friedländer. They had met each other previously in Berlin at the Jewish Cultural Association. At Theresienstadt she witnessed the arrival of evacuated inmates from Auschwitz who had been on the road for three months, having been sent a few days before the liberation on 27 January 1945. She said, "You couldn't tell the living from the dead. People who hardly looked like people anymore. Almost everyone wore striped pajamas". The SS left the camp on 5 May 1945, and Red Cross vehicles arrived. She said that no one in the camp noticed: "Nobody was happy, nobody changed their daily routine." On 8 May, the Soviet Army took command of the camp. She was initially reluctant to leave for fear of being shot.

Immediately after the liberation, Adolf proposed to her. She said, "I wasn't in love with Adolf. I needed time to become human again. It was the same for Adolf. The pain brought us closer together than being in love." They were married at Theresienstadt by a rabbi on 26 June 1945, six weeks after the liberation. They then spent a year in a displaced persons camp in Deggendorf, Lower Bavaria.

== Emigration to the United States ==
In 1946, Friedländer and her husband moved to the United States and lived in Queens, New York. There she worked as a travel agent and as a seamstress. They both swore never to return to Germany. After her husband's death in 1997, Friedländer decided to take classes at the 92nd Street Y, where she took a memoir class and began to write about her memories of life in Nazi Germany. She recalled, "I had all these stories in my head. Everything started coming back to me, many things that I pushed aside for years". German filmmaker and producer Thomas Halaczinsky took an interest in her memoir and wanted to make a documentary of her life, which required her to return to Berlin. In 2003, she agreed to the documentary. When they arrived in Berlin, she walked Halaczinsky around the streets, remembering every building with ease. This motivated her to return to Berlin permanently. She said, "I felt I was home again". The documentary, titled Don't Call It Heimweh, premiered at the Woodstock Film Festival in October 2004.

The Berlin Senate invited Friedländer to visit Berlin as part of a visitor program for persecuted and emigrated citizens. After accepting the invitation, she visited her old apartment building on Skalitzer Straße. She became friends with the Berlin Secretary of State for Culture, André Schmitz. She began to visit Berlin often and when she was in New York, she wrote her autobiography and published it in 2008.

== Return to Berlin ==
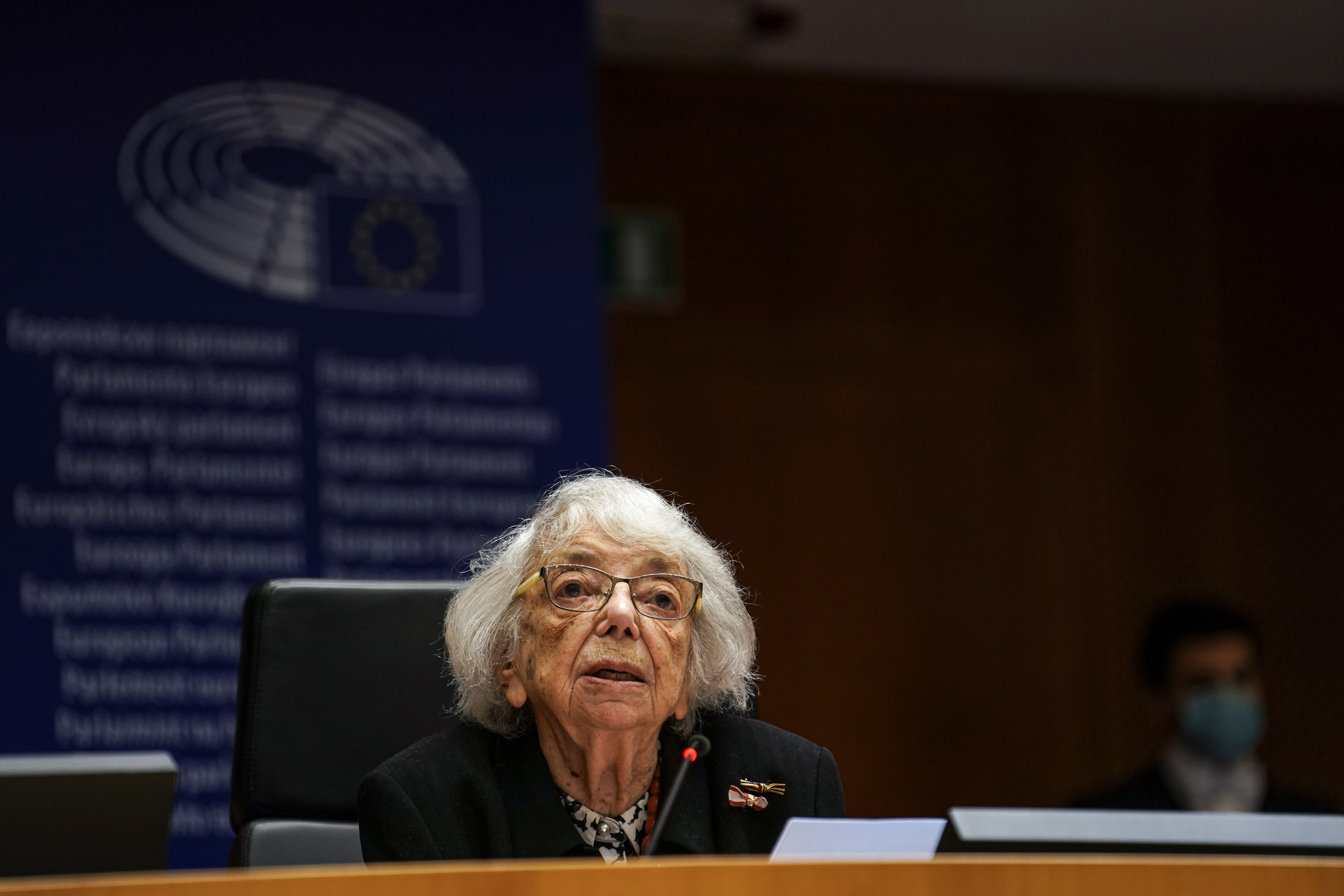
Friedländer at the International Holocaust Remembrance Day 2022

In 2010, she decided to return to Berlin permanently, aged 88, and began to give frequent talks about her experiences of the Holocaust, particularly in German schools. She decided to make it her mission to tell young people about her experiences in Nazi Germany and explained, "My brother did not have a chance. But the young people today do". Her German citizenship was restored, and she settled in the capital.

On 5 November 2021, Friedländer celebrated her 100th birthday. German President Frank-Walter Steinmeier congratulated her and described her as a "tireless fighter against hate, exclusion and far-right extremism".

On 27 January 2022, she attended a plenary session at the European Parliament in Brussels to mark Holocaust Memorial Day. The ceremony marked the 77th anniversary of the liberation of the Auschwitz German concentration camp in Poland. At the event she denounced COVID-19 protestors who had worn yellow stars that were similar to the Judenstern that Jews were forced to wear by the Nazis.

Friedländer died in Berlin on 9 May 2025, at the age of 103, the same day she was expected to receive the Commander's Cross of the Order of Merit of the Federal Republic of Germany.

== Margot Friedländer Prize ==
In 2014, the Schwarzkopf Foundation created the Margot Friedländer Prize, an annual award in her honour to help young people in fighting antisemitism and racism.

== Honours and awards ==
On 9 November 2011, Friedländer was awarded the Cross of the Order of Merit from President Christian Wulff at Bellevue Palace.

She received the German Jewish History Award from the Obermayer Foundation in 2018.

In 2018, she was made an honorary citizen of Berlin.

In May 2019, she was awarded the Talisman Prize by the Deutschlandstiftung Integration by former president and chairman of the Foundation Council Christian Wulff and Chancellor Angela Merkel at a foundation ceremony to mark the 70th anniversary of the Basic Law in Berlin.

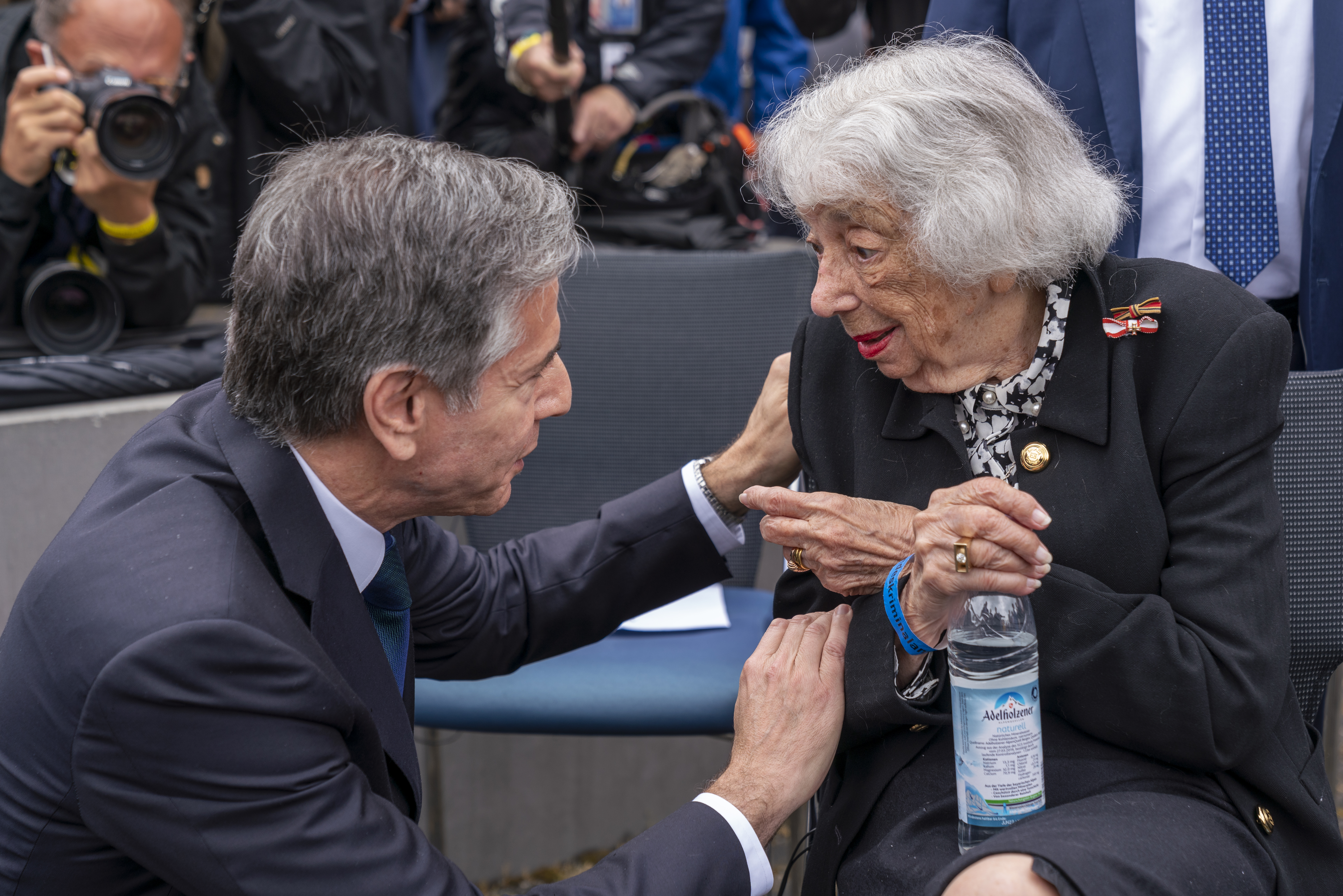
With Antony Blinken in 2021

In June 2021, she was awarded the Jeanette Wolff Medal for special merits in Christian-Jewish dialogue.

On 25 May 2022, she was awarded an honorary doctorate by Freie Universität Berlin.

On 4 July 2022, Friedländer was awarded the Walther Rathenau Prize for outstanding lifetime achievement in foreign policy at a ceremony in Berlin. German president Frank-Walter Steinmeier praised her for "working for democracy and human rights and in fighting hatred and all forms of antisemitism and prejudice".

On 23 January 2023, Berlin mayor Franziska Giffey presented her with the Officer's Cross of the Order of Merit of the Federal Republic of Germany.

== Memorial plaque ==
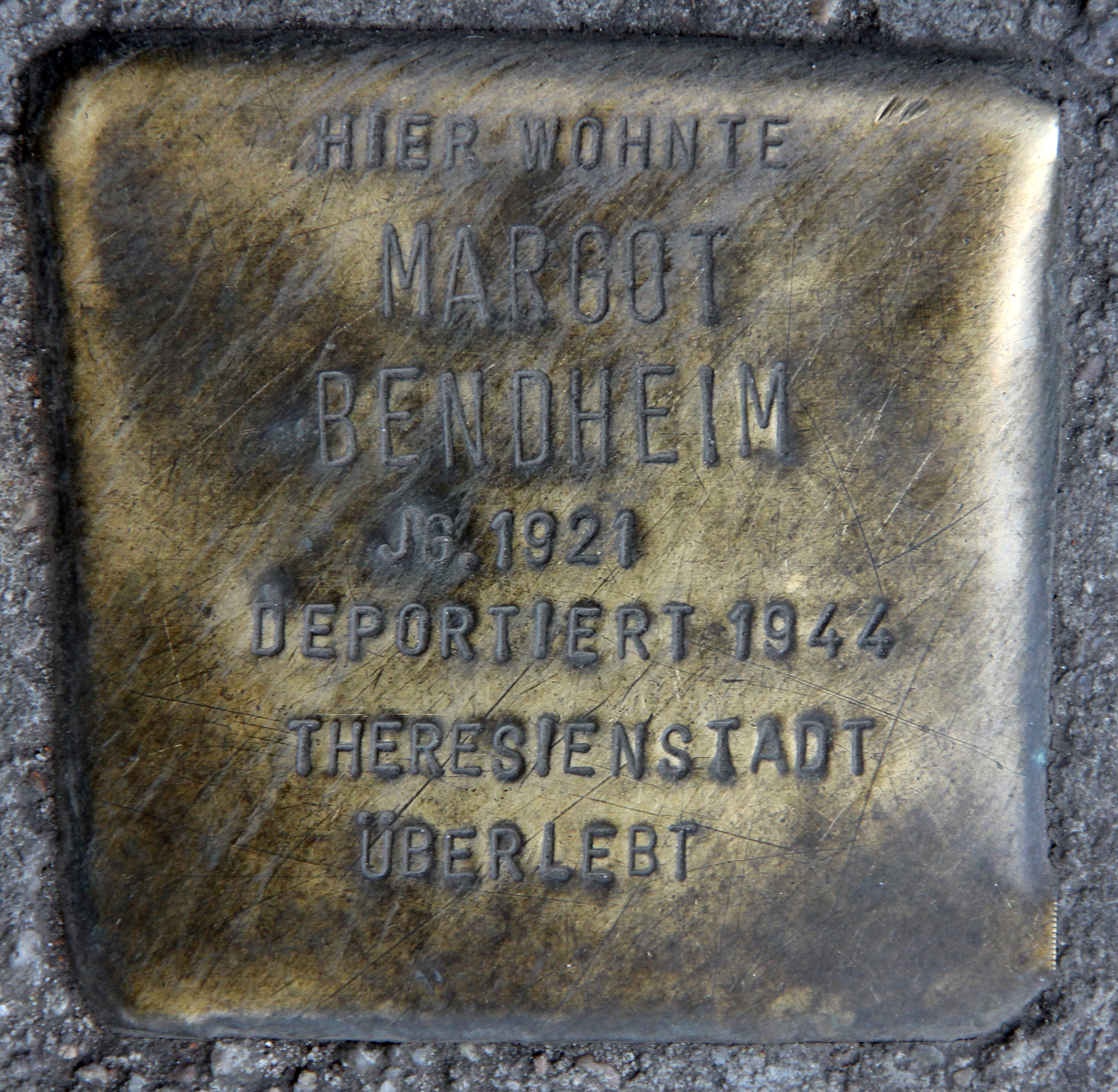
Friedländer's Stolperstein (transl. stumbling block) at Skalitzer Straße 32 (52°29′56″N 13°25′30″E) in Berlin

A Stolperstein plaque was placed on the ground in front of the building where she used to live in Kreuzberg. The plaque, inscribed in German, reads "Here lived Margot Bendheim, born in 1921, deported to Theresienstadt in 1944, survived".

== Publications ==
Friedländer's memoir Versuche, dein Leben zu machen (Try to make your life) was published in 2008 and an English translation was published in 2014. The title was her mother's final message to her. It was awarded the Einhard-Preis.

In October 2021, she presented a book titled Ich lieb' Berlin (lit. 'I love Berlin') comprising portrait photographs of various locations in Berlin taken by Matthias Ziegler, including Berlin Anhalter Bahnhof, the train station from which she was deported.

== Other media ==
Friedländer narrated passages from her autobiography as part of an audio guide city tour of Berlin by Yopegu, which begins on Skalitzer Straße in Kreuzberg where she used to live.

She appeared in the series finale of Joanna Lumley's Great Cities of the World, which aired on ITV on 31 March 2022.

In the summer of 2024, she appeared on the cover of German Vogue for an issue themed "love". In the interview for the article, she noted the rise in antisemitism and far-right nationalism, saying, "Look toward what brings us together. Be people. Be sensible".
