= Hotel Excelsior =

Hotel in Berlin, Germany

Coordinates: 52°30′16″N 13°22′59″E

Travel brochure for the "Hotel Excelsior - Grösstes Hotel des Kontinents", circa 1929.

Hotel Excelsior was a hotel in Berlin, Germany. It occupied number 112/113, Königgrätzer Straße (today's Stresemannstrasse) on Askanischer Platz in the Berlin district of Kreuzberg. It was one of the largest and most luxurious hotels in Europe, until its destruction during World War II.

== Early years ==
Otto Rehnig, the architect responsible for the similarly fated Hotel Esplanade Berlin, was commissioned to design a hotel to accommodate the floods of passengers arriving at the Anhalter Bahnhof across the street. When the Excelsior first opened on the 2nd of April 1908 after over two years of construction work it accommodated a modest 200 rooms, but when an additional section was built on Anhalter Strasse 6 in 1912/13 the hotel almost doubled in size.

The untimely re-opening of the hotel on the eve of World War I meant that the building spent its early existence relatively empty. As the war progressed, the hotel's fortunes dwindled. In 1903, Curt Elschner took out a lease on the Hotel Metropol in Erfurt, before taking over the Hotel Esplanade in Hamburg and then a number of other hotels and restaurants across Germany. After his war service, Elschner spent a short time in 1919 working as an advisor and front man to the politician and industrialist Hugo Stinnes, when the latter was elected to parliament in Berlin before Elschner finally took the reins of the Excelsior.

== Excelsior expansion in the golden twenties ==
Under Elschner's management, the 1920s witnessed the Excelsior transformed into a 7,500 square metres (81,000 sq ft) hotel complex.

Using contemporary deluxe US hotels as inspiration, Elschner installed new power and water systems and gas heating, and the coal-powered bakery and kitchens were introduced to electricity. Between 1925 and 1926, the hotel's guest capacity was expanded under the guidance of architects Heidenreich und Michel. In 1927-28, under the direction of architect Johann Emil Schaudt (1871–1957), an 1800 m² area of the hotel cellars was transformed into a spa.

An image from an Excelsior travel brochure circa 1931 showing the tunnel connecting the hotel to Anhalter Bahnhof.

In 1929, an underpass connecting the hotel with the Anhalter Bahnhof across the street was constructed. The 80-metre long, 3-metre wide and 3-metre high 1.2 million Reichsmark construction, is believed to have been the largest of its type in the world. The tunnel meant that the hotel's guests could travel from their train compartment to their hotel bedroom and back again without ever having to step out into the Askanischen Platz and outside weather. There was also an official railway ticket booth built in the hotel.

When the renovations were completed, the Hotel Excelsior accommodated 600 rooms, 750 beds, 250 bathrooms, 9 restaurants, and a library. It also provided guests with 200 daily newspapers from around the world. The interior decoration included marble-covered walls and adornment by the Berlin-born artist Carl Langhammer (1868–1956).

== Excelsior in Hitler's thirties ==
At the start of the 1930s, NSDAP leadership in Munich earmarked the Excelsior as Hitler's base in Berlin until he secured leadership. The proposal was rejected by Elschner, however, and the Führer was forced to opt for the Hotel Kaiserhof in Wilhelmplatz. The NSDAP then imposed a party ban on the hotel. Nevertheless, this did not stop them from sparking further controversy within its walls. Its grand hall, known as "Saal des freien Denkens" (The Hall of Free Thought), featured numerous stain-glass windows featuring popes, religious founders and various Greek and Jewish philosophers. The NSDAP objected to the images of Jews, and after a violent debate, they were packed away in crates and replaced by portraits of the new leadership. They also objected to many of the titles in the hotel library, so these were taken away and burnt.

== World War II and the demise of the Excelsior ==
At the beginning of World War II, Elschner fled Germany, and in 1942, the NSV (Nationalsozialistische Volkswohlfahrt), a welfare subsidiary of the NSDAP, took over ownership of the Excelsior. During the wartime period, the hotel became known as the "Fehling-Bunker." The title honoured Jürgen Fehling, the then director at the theatre in Königgrätzer Straße (today known as the Hebbel Theater). A sign hung over the main entrance saying "Wehrmacht-Betreuungsstelle (Armed-Forces Care Point) Gepäckaufbewahrung (Left Luggage)".

At the end of April 1945, as the war was coming to an end, allied bombers reduced the Excelsior to a burning ruin. The attack left many dead and the hotel largely destroyed. In 1954, it was demolished completely, six years before the remains of the Anhalter Bahnhof were pulled down. Whether or not the underpass that connected them still exists is unclear.

== Aftermath ==
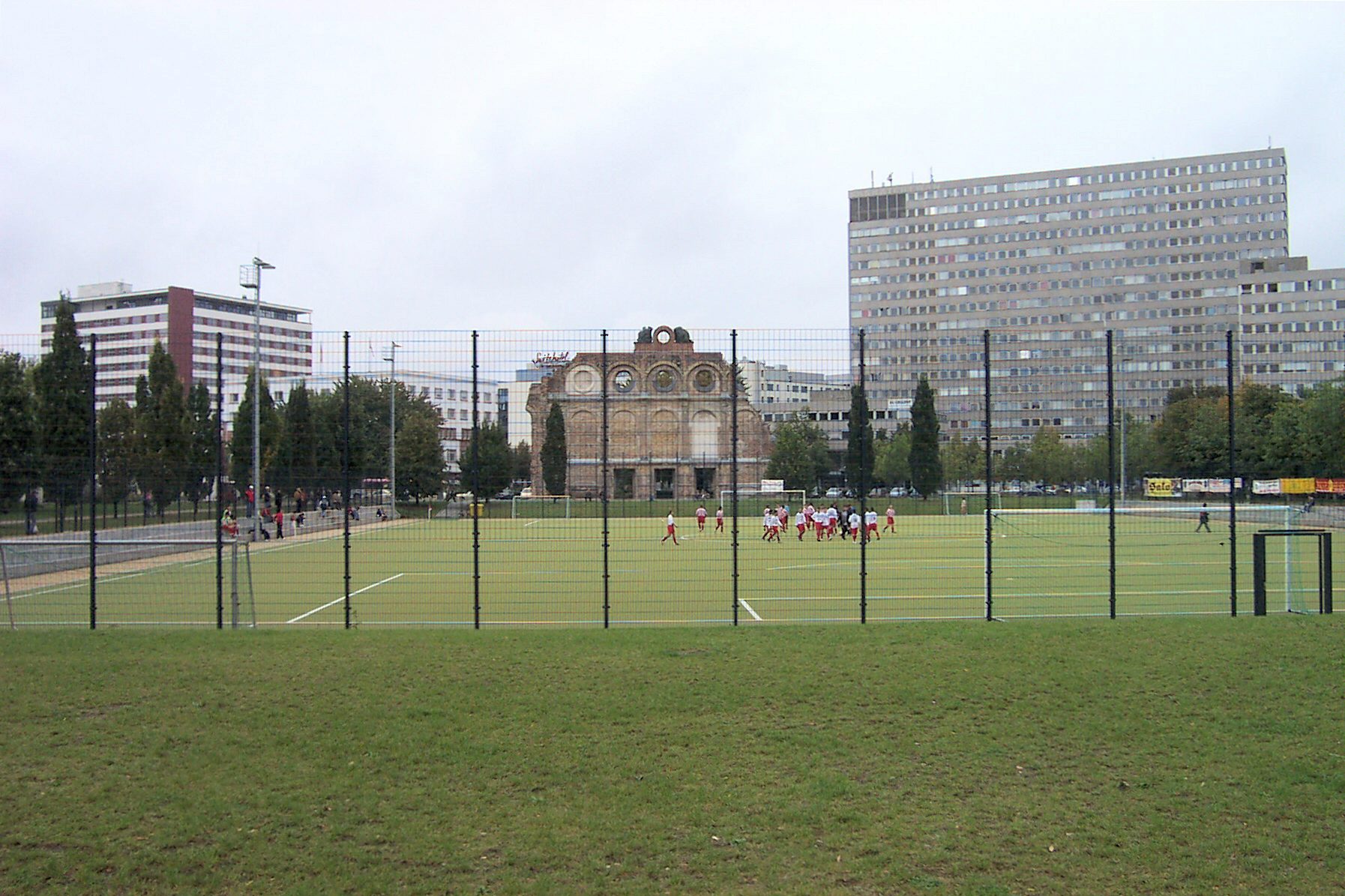
Current view with Excelsiorhaus from the sixties in the background and remnants of the former Anhalter train station in the foreground.

Between 1967 and 1972, the architect group G. Krebs and Sobotka & Müller erected a building called Excelsiorhaus with 500 apartments, shops, and business offices on the hotel site for the "Excelsior-Petrol Station GmbH & Co KG".

A hotel with the traditional name "Hotel Excelsior" is located today in the Hardenbergstraße in the Berlin district of Charlottenburg-Wilmersdorf and is managed by the hotel management company "Grand City Hotels & Resort".

== Legacy ==
The Excelsior was the inspiration for the novel Menschen im Hotel (1929) by the Austrian writer Vicki Baum (1888–1960). The book in turn inspired the Academy Award-winning Hollywood film, Grand Hotel. The hotel appears in Walter Ruttmann's 1927 film Berlin: Symphony of a Metropolis.

It is believed that it was here, on 11 November 1918, that Karl Liebknecht and Rosa Luxemburg's leftist revolutionary group renamed themselves the Spartakusbund (The Spartacus League).

The 1967–1972 replacement apartment building of the same name is featured in the 2017 film Berlin Excelsior.
