= Excelsiorhaus =

Residential building in Berlin (built 1968)

Coordinates: 52°30′14.3″N 13°23′02.2″E

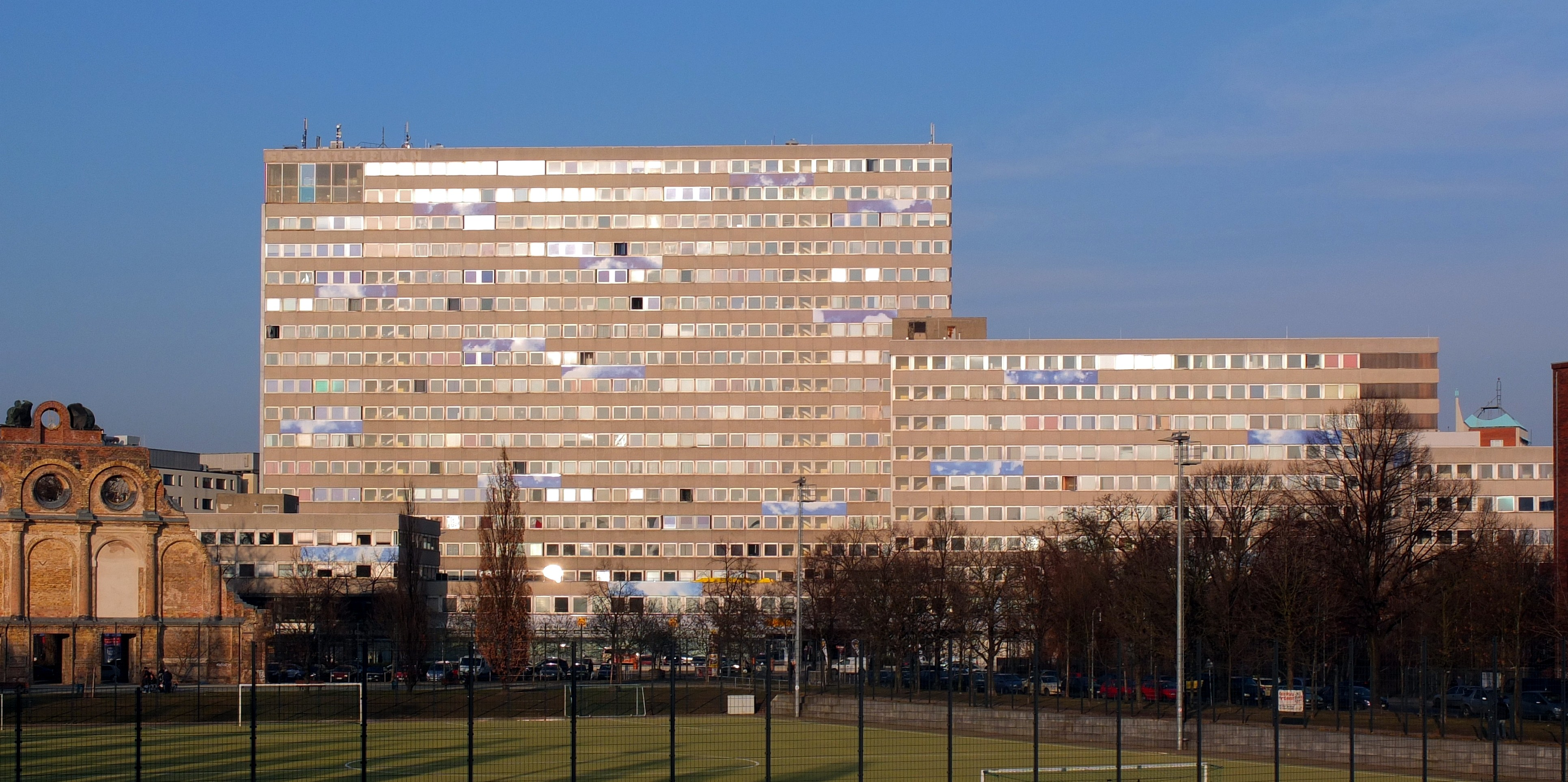
The Excelsiorhaus as seen from the nearby Tempodrom. In the left foreground is the entrance portal of the Anhalter Bahnhof, which was destroyed during World War II.

The Excelsiorhaus is a residential and commercial high-rise building in the Kreuzberg district of Berlin, located at Stresemannstraße 68–78. It was designed from 1965 as an apartment building modeled on developments in New York City by the Berlin architectural firm Sobotka and Müller, and constructed between 1966 and 1968 for Excelsior Tankstellen GmbH & Co. KG. The company belonged to investor Artur Pfaff.

After initial financing difficulties, construction costs amounted to approximately 50 million Deutsche Mark (equivalent to roughly several hundred million euros in today's purchasing power). The building is 59.7 m tall, has 18 storeys, and offers 33,203 m^{2} of usable space, including 506 apartments and 39 commercial units. Since summer 2011, it has been owned by the holding company of investor Nicolas Berggruen.

The name refers to the former Hotel Excelsior, which stood on the site before World War II and was considered one of the largest hotels in continental Europe.

== Usage ==
The 16th and 17th floors of the Excelsiorhaus contain premises for a gastronomic establishment. They are connected internally by a spiral staircase and can be accessed via a glass external elevator running along the northern façade, which travels non-stop between the ground floor and the 16th floor. At the time of the building's opening, this panoramic elevator was the first of its kind in West Berlin and was regarded as an attraction.

In the early years, the Canadian restaurant Saskatchewan occupied the space. Its highly visible illuminated sign initially gave the building the nickname “Saskatchewan high-rise”.

Later, the nightclub Turn Tower used the premises, becoming particularly popular within the West Berlin art scene in the 1980s. After several years of vacancy, the Solar Bar opened there in December 2005.

On the ground floor, there was a nine-pin bowling alley until the early 2010s, as well as, for a short time, the Café Europa, where cars could also be purchased. In 2014, a branch of the supermarket chain Lidl opened on the ground floor. Since 2019, the basement has housed the Basement Boulderstudio.

A fallout shelter for around 3,100 people was opened beneath the Excelsiorhaus in 1976. It included medical rooms, a soup kitchen, 40 toilets and washbasins, and its own well at a depth of 60 m. The emergency power generator ran on diesel fuel and consumed 50 liters per hour. The tanks held up to 27,000 liters, allowing occupants to remain sheltered for up to 14 days.

== Features ==
The building's metal windows do not open in the usual side-hinged manner; instead, they are mounted at the top and bottom in the center and rotate along a vertical axis. This allows the exterior side to be turned inward for cleaning, significantly simplifying maintenance.

Since 2013, an art installation has been mounted on the façade facing Stresemannstraße. It consists of elongated panels distributed across the façade, printed with a pixelated cloud sky.

In October 2017, the documentary film Berlin Excelsior, produced by Peter Rommel, premiered at the Hof International Film Festival. Director Erik Lemke—himself a resident—focuses on the postwar building, whose fluctuating history between ambitious plans and foreclosure is suggested through archival footage from Sender Freies Berlin. The film portrays residents “who unsuccessfully attempt to realize the promises of happiness of our society”, while largely avoiding interviews and voice-over narration.

On 2 July 2014, a brutal murder occurred in the Excelsiorhaus that attracted national attention. The victim was killed with 67 stab wounds. According to media reports, it was a crime of passion.
