= Berlin Anhalter Bahnhof =

Formerly terminus and today underground S-Bahn station in Berlin

Coordinates: 52°30′11″N 13°22′55″E

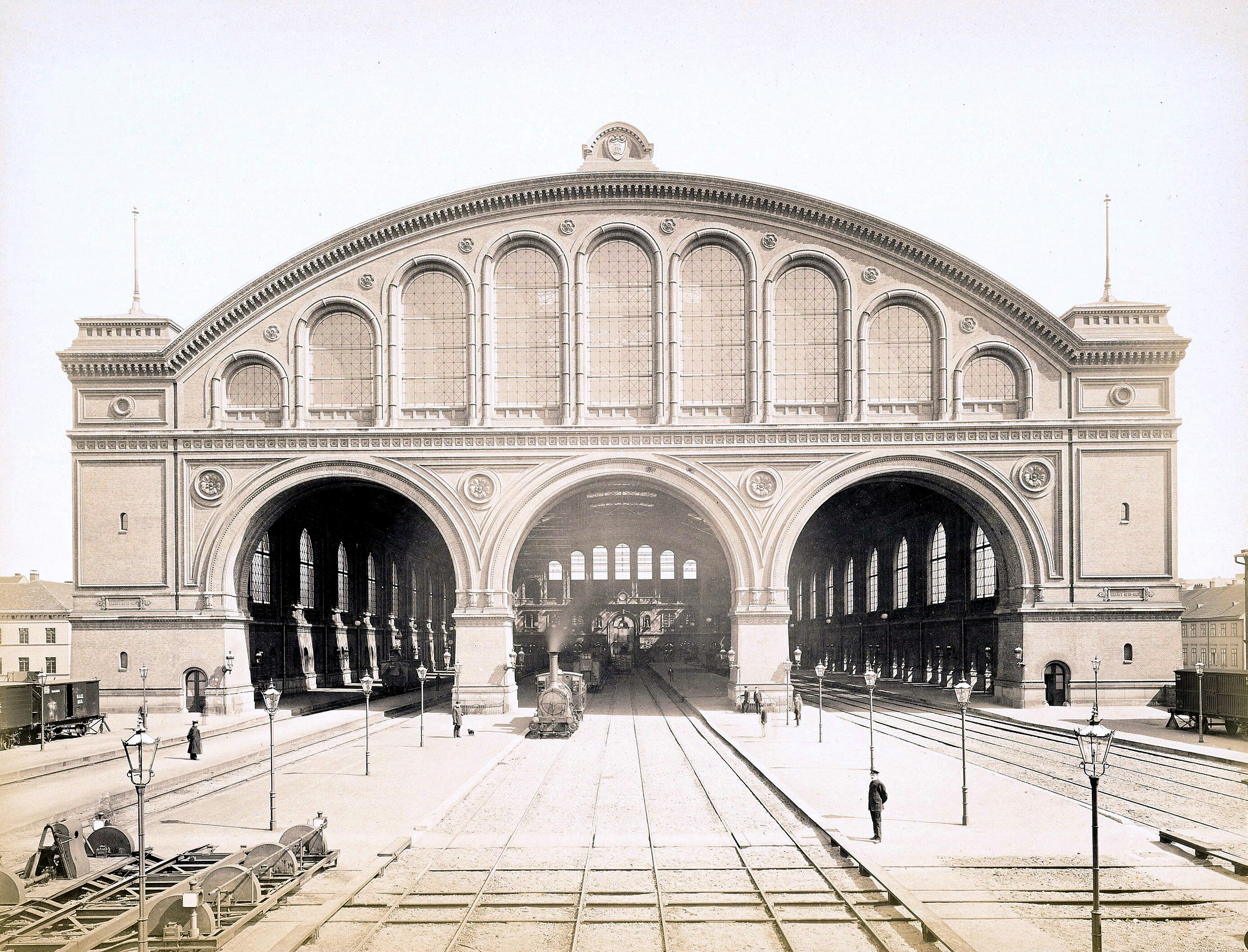
- The south facade in 1881

General information
- Location: Friedrichshain-Kreuzberg, Berlin; Germany

Other information
- Station code: n/a
- DS100 code: BAHU
- Category: 4
- Fare zone: VBB: Berlin A/5555

History
- Opened: 1841
- Closed: 1952

Services
| Preceding station | Berlin S-Bahn | Following station |
|---|---|---|
| Potsdamer Platz towards Oranienburg | S1 | Yorckstraße towards Wannsee |
| Potsdamer Platz towards Bernau | S2 | Yorckstraße towards Blankenfelde |
| Potsdamer Platz towards Hennigsdorf | S25 | Yorckstraße towards Teltow Stadt |
| Potsdamer Platz towards Blankenburg | S26 | Yorckstraße towards Teltow Stadt |
Location

The Anhalter Bahnhof is a former railway terminus in Berlin, Germany, approximately 600 m (2,000 ft) southeast of Potsdamer Platz. Once one of Berlin's most important railway stations, it was severely damaged in World War II, and finally closed for traffic in 1952, when the GDR-owned Deutsche Reichsbahn rerouted all railway traffic between Berlin and places in the GDR avoiding the West Berlin area. The station's name lives on in the Berlin S-Bahn station of the same name, opened in October 1939 as part of the North-South S-Bahn link.

== Construction ==
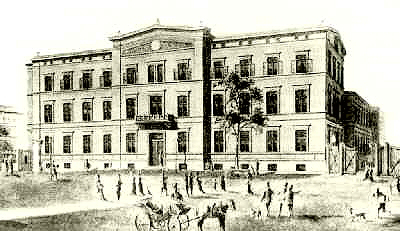
The 1841 frontage.

Work to build the Anhalter Bahnhof began on 15 April 1839. As the Berlin terminus, of what become known as the Anhalt Railway, it opened on 1 July 1841 as far as Jüterbog (the inaugural train being hauled by the very first Borsig locomotive), and extended to Dessau, Köthen and beyond at later dates. It became known as the "Anhalt line" because it ran through the historical state of Anhalt, which in turn gave the new Berlin terminus its name. The network quickly grew to serve train services between Leipzig, Frankfurt am Main and Munich.

The front façade faced Askanischer Platz, which was basically a widened section of a street that at that time was known as Hirschelstraße (later Königgrätzer Straße, Stresemannstraße, Saarlandstraße and today back again to Stresemannstraße), then a fairly ramshackle thoroughfare linking Askanischer Platz with Potsdamer Platz (and the Potsdamer Bahnhof), and with Berlin's old customs or excise wall (German: Akzisemauer) running down its centre. At the time of the Anhalter Bahnhof's construction there was no opening in the customs wall at this location, and so one was clearly needed so that travellers could get from city to station and vice versa. And so the Anhalter Gate was created in 1839–40, and bore a strong resemblance to architect Karl Friedrich Schinkel's Potsdam Gate up the road. A new thoroughfare, Anhalter Straße, led from the gate into the city. The Anhalter Gate was one of four extra ones provided in the years after the customs wall's original erection, increasing the total number of gates around the city from 14 to 18. The customs wall eventually became redundant and was demolished in 1866–67, which allowed Hirschelstraße (newly renamed Königgrätzer Straße), to be developed into a proper street for the first time.

== Expansion ==
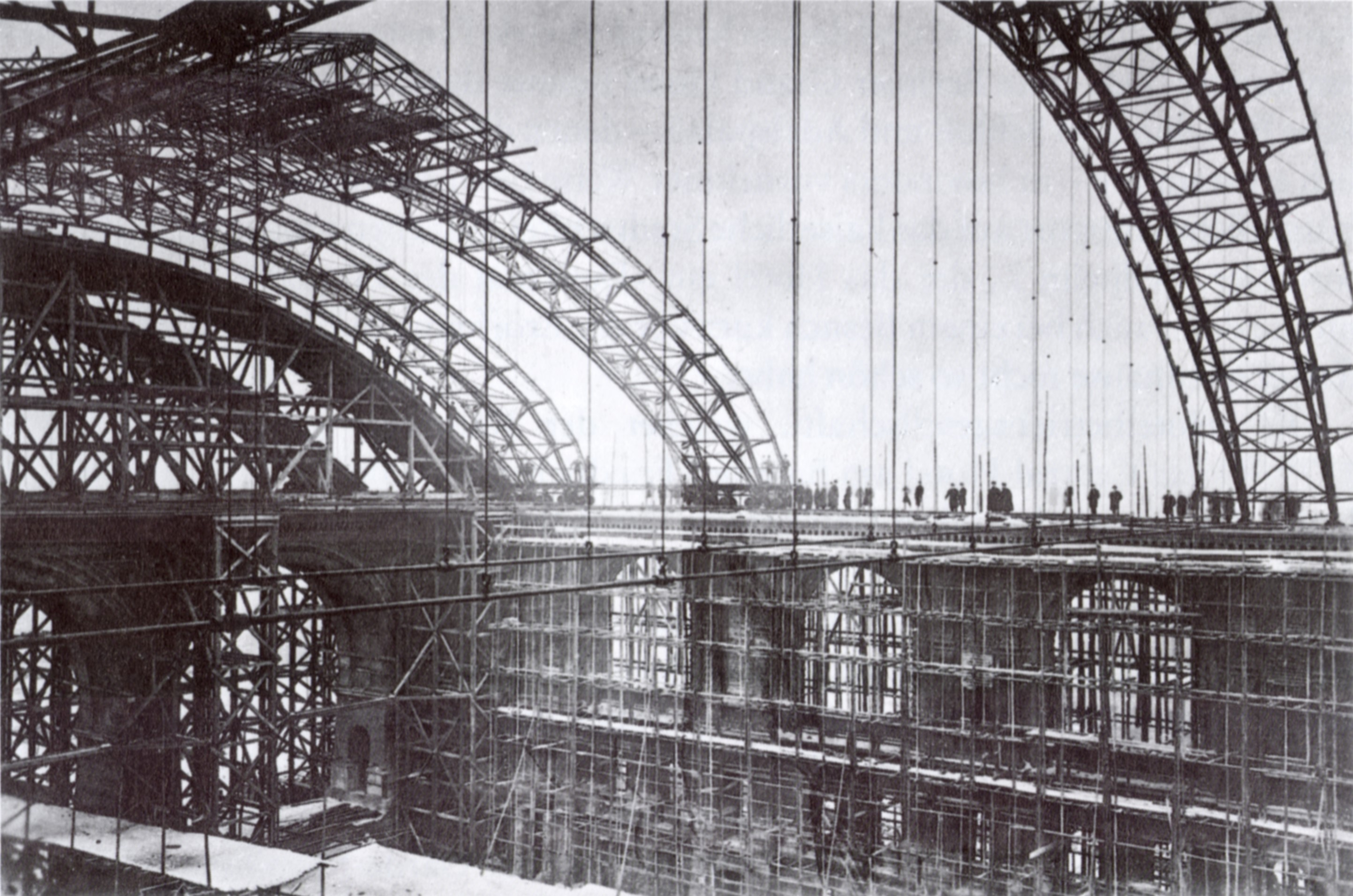
Anhalter Bahnhof - the new train shed roof takes shape c. 1878

Like nearby Potsdamer Bahnhof, the Anhalter Bahnhof opened as a fairly modest building (behind administration block); the platform was just 15 m (49 ft) wide. However, as the German rail network expanded throughout the 19th century so did the Anhalter Bahnhof to handle the growth.

In 1872, architect Franz Heinrich Schwechten (1841-1924) designed the vast new station that would also be the biggest in Germany and at the time the biggest in Continental Europe, though it was later surpassed. A temporary station was opened in 1874; the old one was demolished in 1875 and the new one begun in 1876. On 15 June 1880, the new terminus was opened by Kaiser Wilhelm I and Chancellor Otto von Bismarck. The new façade was 101 m across and embellished with zinc sculptures titled Day and Night by Ludwig Brunow (1843-1913), positioned on either side of the clock above the main entrance. Emil Hundrieser (1846-1911) was responsible for a sculpture on the very top of the façade called The International Traffic. Inside the building was a lavish and spacious booking hall with separate waiting rooms and facilities for no fewer than four classes of ticket holders. A separate entrance and reception area were provided for visiting royalty, and these saw frequent use. Behind all this, the huge iron and glass train-shed roof by writer and engineer Heinrich Seidel (1842-1906) measured 171 m long by 62 m wide (covering 10,600 m^{2}, under which 40,000 people could stand), and rose to 34 m in height along its centre line. The Anhalter Güterbahnhof (goods station), also opened, south of the Landwehr Canal on the same date as the passenger station.

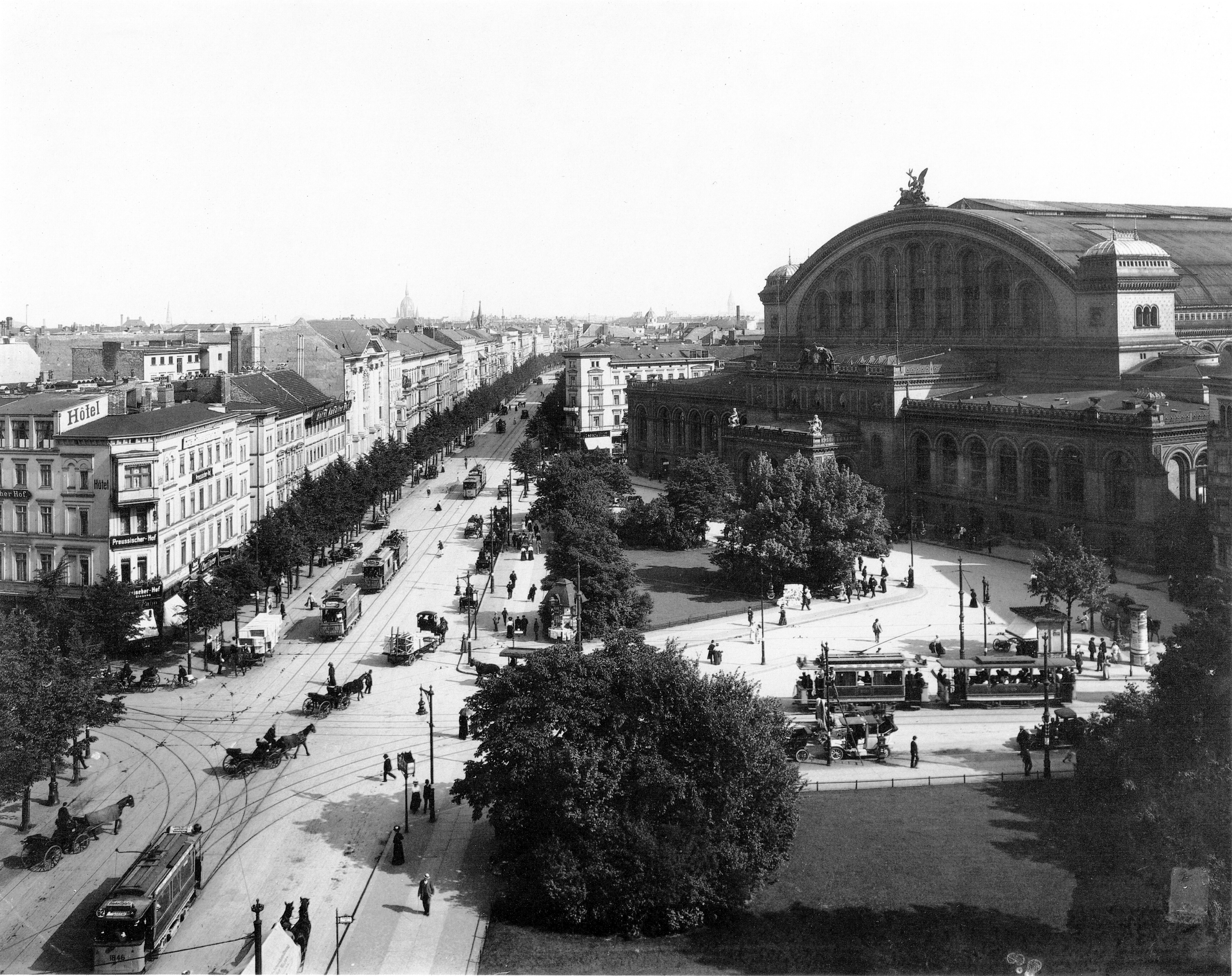
A 1900 view showing the front façade of the second Anhalter Bahnhof with Askanischer Platz and Königgrätzer Straße, as it was then known

Initially the rebuilt terminus was still handling train services mainly to and from Leipzig, Frankfurt am Main and Munich, over the old Anhalter route. However, two years later it inherited a whole new range of services with the closure of the Dresdner Bahnhof. This terminus had opened on 17 June 1875, with trains to Dresden (over the so-called "Dresdener line"), Prague and Vienna, but was small and inconveniently sited some distance from the centre of the city, south of the Landwehr Canal. The Anhalter Bahnhof was more than capable of handling these services as well, and so on 15 October 1882 they were switched, and the Dresdner Bahnhof closed (its building actually still exists, next to the present Gleisdreieck U-Bahn station, having for many years served as part of a major mail-handling facility, itself since closed, called the Postbahnhof). This move was the key to establishing the Anhalter Bahnhof's ultimate importance, as the terminus became Berlin's “Gateway to the South,” with services via Dresden not only to Prague and Vienna, but to places as far away as Rome, Naples and Athens.

Next to the passenger terminus, was the Anhalter Güterbahnhof (goods station). The building, which had also been built by Franz Heinrich Schwechten, was located on the south bank of the Landwehr Canal immediately to the east of the parallel passenger lines. This artistic representation is Schwechten's own front elevation, showing the twin administration blocks linked by an attractive bridge structure, with three arches through which road vehicles passed into the so-called "ladestrasse" (loading road), 20 m (66 ft) wide. On either side were covered goods-handling areas some 210 m (690 ft) in length, with the railway sidings on the other side, to enable efficient movement of goods from railway wagons to road vehicles or vice versa.

Since the early 20th century, the area around the Anhalter Bahnhof was popular with industrialists looking for a suitable location to build a nationwide cartel headquarters. The most renowned cartel of these was the German potash syndicate.

== Nazi Germany ==
By the 1930s, trains left its six platforms every three to five minutes, carrying an average of 44,000 people daily (around 16 million a year, compared with barely 49,000 at Berlin Tempelhof Airport). Though still less busy than the Potsdamer Bahnhof up the road, the Anhalter Bahnhof was superior in its sheer scale, and in the opulence of its train services. Also by this time, the station was connected directly with a hotel which faced it across Askanischer Platz - the Hotel Excelsior, Europe's largest - by means of a tunnel, believed to be the longest of its kind in the world at 100 m, constructed in 1927–1928. The station had an underground arcade with five shops.

However, despite its size and passenger numbers, the station was earmarked for redevelopment as part of Adolf Hitler's grand plan to transform Berlin into the Welthauptstadt (World Capital) Germania. Under the Nazis’ plan, which was to be realised by Albert Speer, the building would have ceased to be a railway terminus because the new triumphal avenue known as the North-South Axis would have severed its tracks. All rail traffic arriving in Berlin would instead have been redirected to two vast new stations located on the Ringbahn. To the north of the city centre, would have been the Nordbahnhof (North Station) at Wedding and opposite to that would have been the Südbahnhof (South Station) in Südkreuz. According to Speer's plan, the Anhalter Bahnhof was earmarked to become a public swimming pool.

== World War II ==
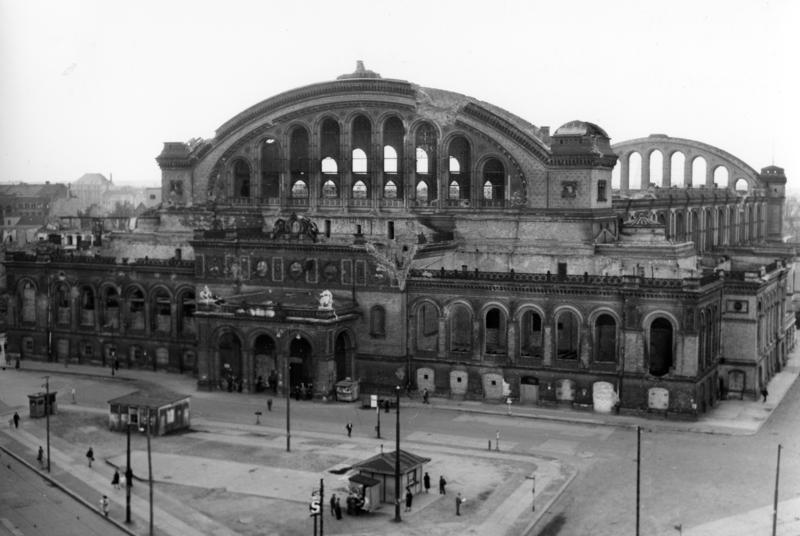
Ruin of the Anhalter Bahnhof, 1951.

During World War II, the Anhalter Bahnhof was one of three stations used to deport about 55,000 Berlin Jews between 1941 and 1945, about a third of the city's entire Jewish population (as of 1933). From Anhalter Bahnhof, 9,600 Jews left in groups of 50 to 100 at a time using 116 trains. In contrast to other deportations which used freight wagons, Jews were taken away in ordinary passenger coaches which were coupled up to regular trains running according to the normal timetable. All deportations were to Theresienstadt in Nazi-occupied Czechoslovakia and from there to other concentration camps.

Anhalter Bahnhof, like most of Berlin, was devastated by British and American bombs and Soviet artillery shells. A massive bombing raid on the night of 23 November 1943 badly affected the station and caused so much damage to rail infrastructure further out that only a few local services could operate and no long-distance trains. Two further major raids on 3 February and 26 February 1945 left the terminus with large sections of its roof missing, the rest unsafe and tottering and no trains running at all. Many sections of the S-Bahn as well as the U-Bahn were also closed during the war due to enemy action and the section through Anhalter Bahnhof was no exception.

== Post war ==
A fragmentary train service resumed along the North-South Link on 2 June 1946 once massive repairs were well advanced (water had to be pumped out at the beginning). Full services recommenced on 16 November 1947, although repairs were not complete until May 1948. The services were extended further in 1951. Another interruption of services was caused by the uprising of 1953 in East Germany, no trains running between 17 June, the day of the uprising, and 9 July. Meanwhile, above ground, American servicemen had dismantled the surviving sections of the Anhalter Bahnhof's roof in March 1948, and a limited train service had begun operating again in August, with a few trains running out into the Saxony-Anhalt and Brandenburg regions, but it was not to last. The station's final demise was caused by the rapid collapse of relations between the Allied Occupying Powers which controlled Berlin and Germany as a whole. The Anhalter Bahnhof was served by trains arriving from places in Soviet-controlled East Germany but the terminus was in West Berlin.

== Closure and demolition ==
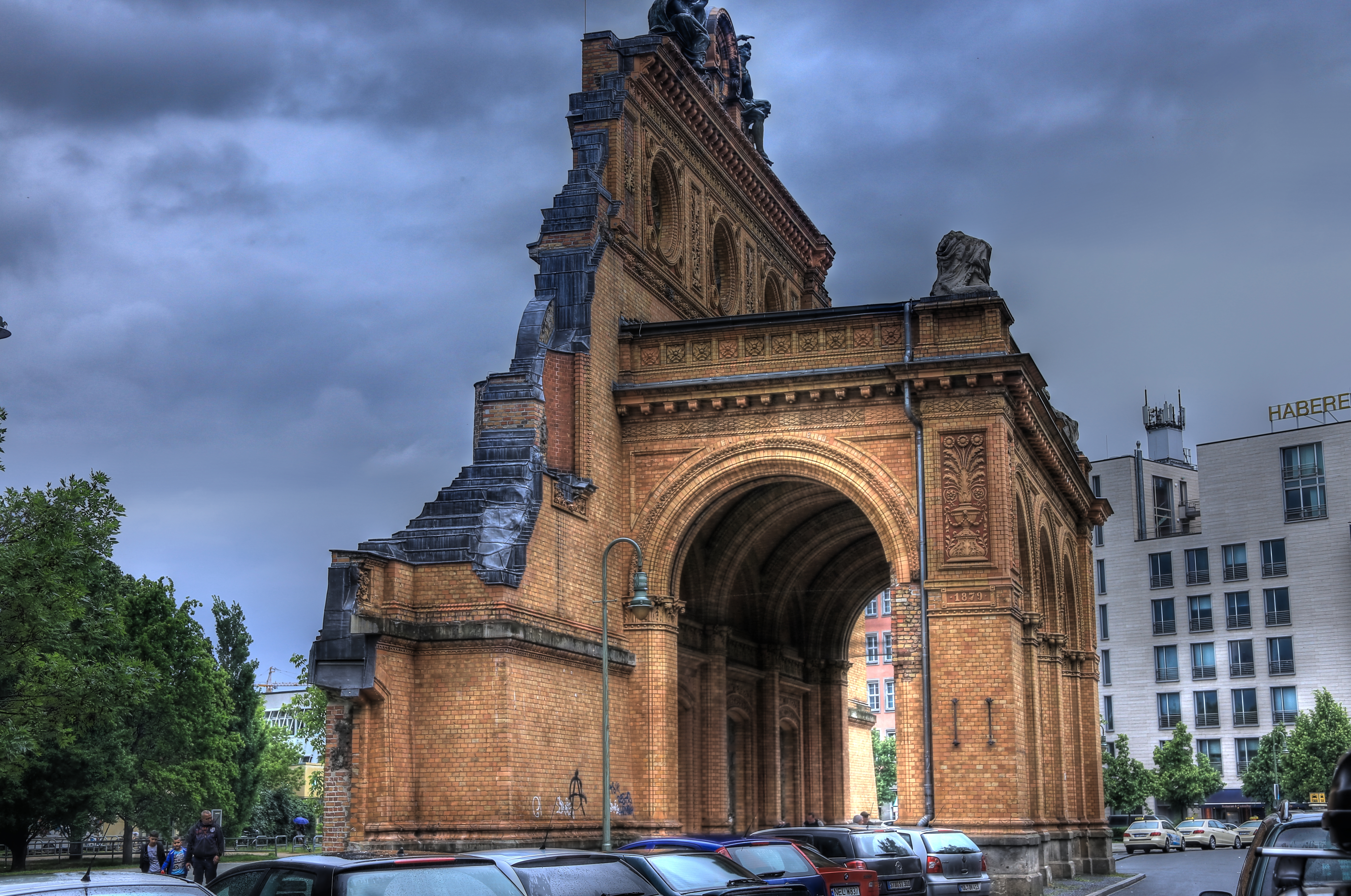
Remains of Anhalter Bahnhof, 2014

Due to its location, the Soviets switched all remaining trains to the Ostbahnhof in the Soviet sector on 17 May 1952. With no services, the Anhalter Bahnhof was closed. Although detailed plans and an architect's model were drawn up to build a vast modern terminus on the site, nothing happened.

After lying derelict for more than eight years, with some tracks and signals still in situ, demolition was begun on 25 August 1960 and completed by 27 August despite considerable public outcry. Part of the centre portion of the façade was allowed to remain standing.

== Redevelopment ==
The area around Anhalter has been significantly redeveloped since the 1950s. There is a memorial display board honouring the Berlin Jews taken from here and elsewhere to their deaths by the Nazis during World War II.

The original "Day and Night" sculptures from the façade, photographed in 2003 in their new home, the German Museum of Technology. Day is on the right, gazing into the distance, while Night, on the left, is looking away.

This view shows the rear of the façade remnant in 2005. In the left background is Europahaus, an office block dating from the early 1930s, while in the right background is the 18-storey Excelsiorhaus, on the site of the former hotel. The tunnel that once linked the station with the hotel was demolished in the mid-1980s as part of roadworks. In the foreground is a large new synthetic playing surface for sports where the train shed once stood. Immediately south, directly behind the photographer, is the Tempodrom.

The Tempodrom, a major new concert and event venue opened on 8 December 2001, extends across the site of the terminus just south of the train shed's former location. Its innovative futuristic roof rises to a height of 37.5 m.

Further south still, extending down to the Landwehr Canal, is an area of woodland, recently tidied up and new paths laid, but amongst the trees and undergrowth, several crumbling sections of platforms are still clearly visible.

This location appeared on many picture postcards in the early years of the 20th century, and in some ways it has not significantly changed since then. The red-painted bridge side-on to the camera is a recent construction for pedestrians and cyclists, approximating in appearance the railway bridge which once crossed at the same spot. The main arch was once the centre span of three of a much older structure located elsewhere in the city - the Marschallbrücke, built by Eduard Albert Paul Gottheiner in 1881–82, which carried Luisenstraße over the River Spree just to the east of the Reichstag. Concerns about its condition, coupled with the need to provide greater clearance for vessels on the river, brought about the replacement of the centre and south spans with one long new span in 1997–99, after which the old centre span was re-erected here as shown, as part of this new bridge designed by Benedict Toon and opened in February 2001. Just beyond it is where the S-Bahn North-South Link runs beneath the canal, and it was here that SS troops blew up the bulkheads in the last days of World War 2, deliberately flooding the tunnel in the hope of slowing the Soviet advance. The Anhalter Bahnhof stood out of the picture to the right (north).

The buildings in the left background, on the south bank of the canal, house the German Museum of Technology. The other bridge, the higher one crossing the canal at a sharp angle, carries a section of U-Bahn line between Gleisdreieck and Möckernbrücke stations. The only surviving parts of the Anhalter Güterbahnhof (Goods Station) is its eastern administration block (on the left in the 1874 elevation). It is now restored and today the home of 'Spectrum', the Berlin Science Centre, another part of the German Museum of Technology. Its western twin was badly damaged in World War 2 and was demolished in 1959, the bridge structure following in 1963; the grey rendered area on the side of the building in this picture marks the bridge's erstwhile location. Down the former loading road on the right, the covered goods-handling area is now used mainly by a variety of small industrial concerns. Further down again is a large overgrown area of almost total desolation. Things are however looking much brighter at the adjacent Anhalter locomotive depot to the west, sandwiched between the Anhalter Güterbahnhof and the former Dresdner Bahnhof. After decades of dereliction its buildings have been restored and also incorporated into the German Museum of Technology.

== Subway station ==
The idea for an S-Bahn North-South Link transversal rail line connecting the northern suburban lines terminating at Stettiner Bahnhof ("Nordbahnhof" since the early 1950s) with the southern suburban lines terminating at Potsdamer Bahnhof had first been mooted in 1892, ten years after the building east–west transversal line, the Stadtbahn connecting the Charlottenburg station and Berlin Schlesischer Bahnhof, but it was not planned in detail until 1928, and then approval had to wait until 1933, as part of Hitler's public works projects (Arbeitsbeschaffungsmaßnahmen) to pacify workers by reducing the high unemployment.

The line to Anhalter Bahnhof, which was begun in 1934, opened in two phases. First the northern section from Stettiner Bahnhof to Unter den Linden, was inaugurated on 28 July 1936, just in time for the Berlin Olympic Games. But in 1937, construction work was paused for several months after Hitler proclaimed his plans for Welthauptstadt (World Capital) Germania on 30 January 1937. Part of the scheme was to remodel Berlin's entire railway system. As this included the North-South S-Bahn link, the northern end of the Anhalter S-Bahn station, already largely finished in 1936, had to be rebuilt to accommodate proposed new S-Bahn lines from Görlitzer Bahnhof; as a result, the westernmost track (1) would no longer be built straight away to Potsdamer Platz station, instead it would be built later. However, war and its outcome made Hitler's plans obsolete - the S-Bahn line to Görlitzer Bahnhof was never built, and the Görlitzer Bahnhof was demolished because of its location in West Berlin with the line leading into it being in East Berlin.

=== Wartime use ===
The second stage was the southern section from Potsdamer Platz via the new underground Anhalter Bahnhof station with the Wannseebahn which opened on 9 October 1939, shortly after the start of World War II. The suburban lines to Zossen and Licherfelde-Ost via Papestraße and Priesterweg were connected to the tunnel on 6 November 1939, making the new north–south transversal line complete.

This underground station was placed at the west side of the existing overground station. At Anhalter Bahnhof S-Bahn station a direct access route to the mainline terminus above was provided from 19 December 1940. At the S-Bahn station four platforms were provided to receive the Wannseebahn and the trains from the two suburban lines coming from Priesterweg station arriving via their separate tunnel mounds on opposite tracks of the receiving platform, and to provide the same for trains departing in the two directions. The station removed two siding tracks behind its south head.

The S-Bahn North-South Link, less than six years old, became the setting for one of the most contentious episodes of the final Battle of Berlin, in late April and early May 1945. With Hitler already dead, the remaining Nazi leaders resorted to increasingly desperate measures to slow the Soviet advance, whatever the consequences for their own citizens. Fearful that the Soviets might try to storm the centre of Berlin by coming through the rail tunnels, on 2 May the Nazi leaders ordered SS troops to blow up the bulkheads where the North-South Link passed beneath the Landwehrkanal. Altogether up to 26 km (16 mi) of tunnels and many stations were flooded by this action, most of which had been used as public shelters and also to house military wounded in hospital trains in underground sidings. The number of people drowned is unknown due to the large variations between estimates. According to Soviet propaganda up to 15,000 may have drowned, although a more conservative figure suggests 200–300.

=== Cold War ===
When the Berlin Wall was erected on 13 August 1961, it had a profound effect on rail services in and around the city, and on the S-Bahn and U-Bahn in particular. Essentially both were divided into two systems, with lines being physically severed where they crossed the border between East Berlin and West Berlin. In most cases trains on either side would simply run as far as the last stop before the border and then reverse back. The S-Bahn North-South Link saw a more bizarre - though not unique - state of affairs. This line, plus two U-Bahn lines elsewhere in the city, suffered from a quirk of geography in that they briefly passed through East German territory en route from one part of West Berlin to another. This gave rise to the infamous "Geisterbahnhöfe" (ghost stations), those unfortunate ones on the eastern side that were sealed off from the outside world and which trains ran straight through without stopping. (One exception was the station Bahnhof Friedrichstraße, where passengers could change trains to the western part of the east–west-S-Bahn and one line of the U-Bahn (today U6).

The S Bahn station also served as a border checkpoint for people entering East Berlin. Trains would generally slow down, however, affording passengers the strange sight of dusty, dimly lit platforms patrolled by armed guards, there to prevent any East Berliners from trying to escape to the West by train. At the points where the lines passed directly beneath the actual border, concrete "collars" were constructed within the tunnels with just the minimum clearance for trains, to prevent people clinging to the sides or roof of the coaches. Anhalter Bahnhof station itself remained open; being in West Berlin, it was the last stop for northbound trains before they entered the "restricted section", and the first stop for southbound trains after they had left the section. However, of its four platforms just two (sometimes only one) saw regular use, and the station appeared to receive only a minimum of cleaning and maintenance.

=== Modern services ===
After the fall of the Wall on 9 November 1989, Anhalter Bahnhof S-Bahn station and all the ghost stations underwent a major refurbishment before being re-opened on 1 March 1992.

The S-Bahn station remains the only one open at the location, and still called "Anhalter Bahnhof" although it is over half a century since the great terminus aboveground closed. As for the terminus itself, today the centre portion of the façade still looks out over Askanischer Platz, having been restored several times since the demolition of the rest of the building. At the top, Ludwig Brunow's Day and Night sculptures, somewhat the worse for wear, still sat on either side of the now empty clock space until the most recent restoration of the structure in 2003–2004, but to avoid further corrosion they have now been replaced by copies (the originals can be seen in the German Museum of Technology, close by on the south bank of the Landwehr Canal). The photograph on the right shows the façade remnant in 2005. The oddly-shaped white building faintly visible in the distance on the right is the Tempodrom, a major new concert and event venue.

== Gallery ==
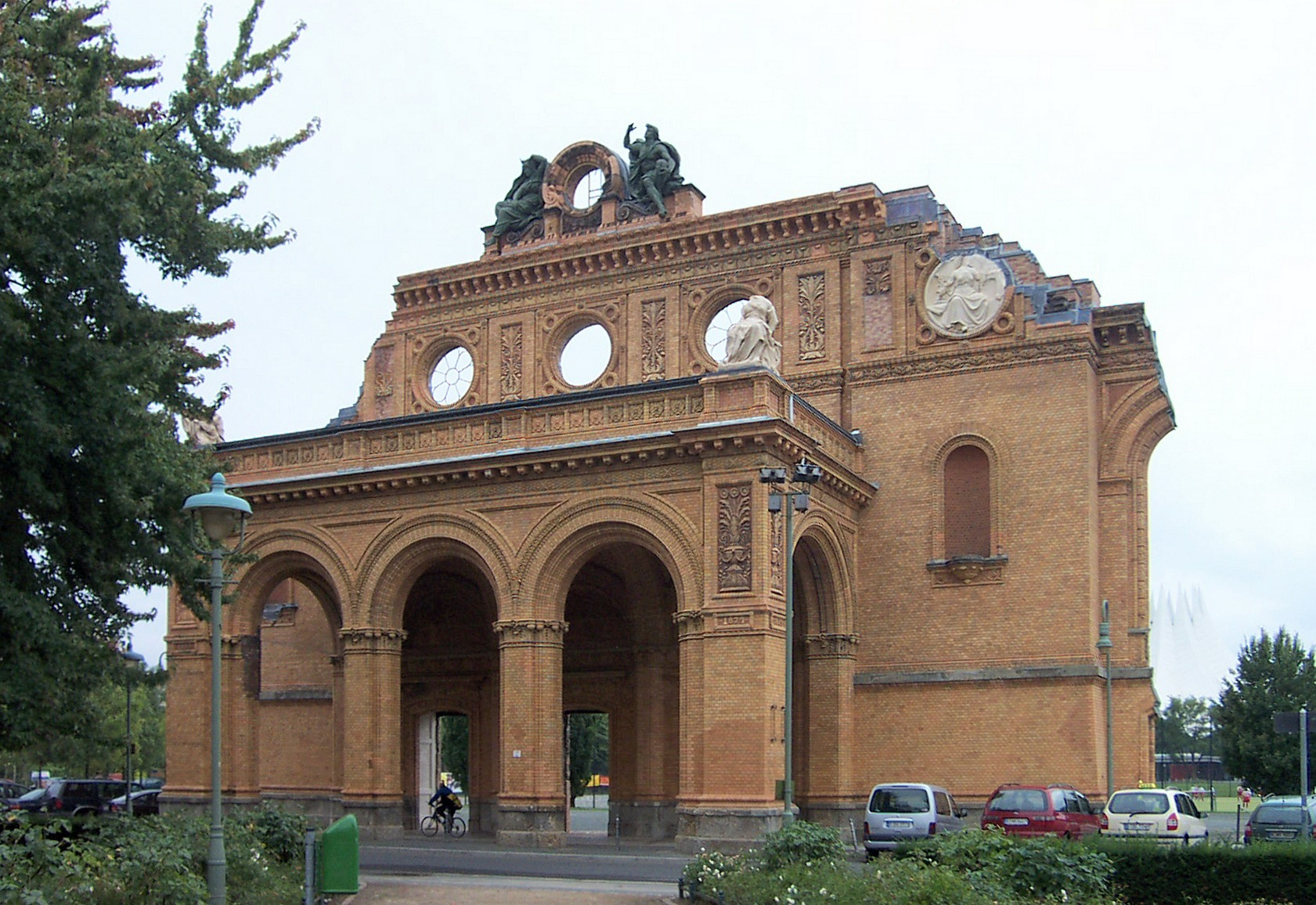
Anhalter Bahnhof 2005. The surviving central portion of the façade.

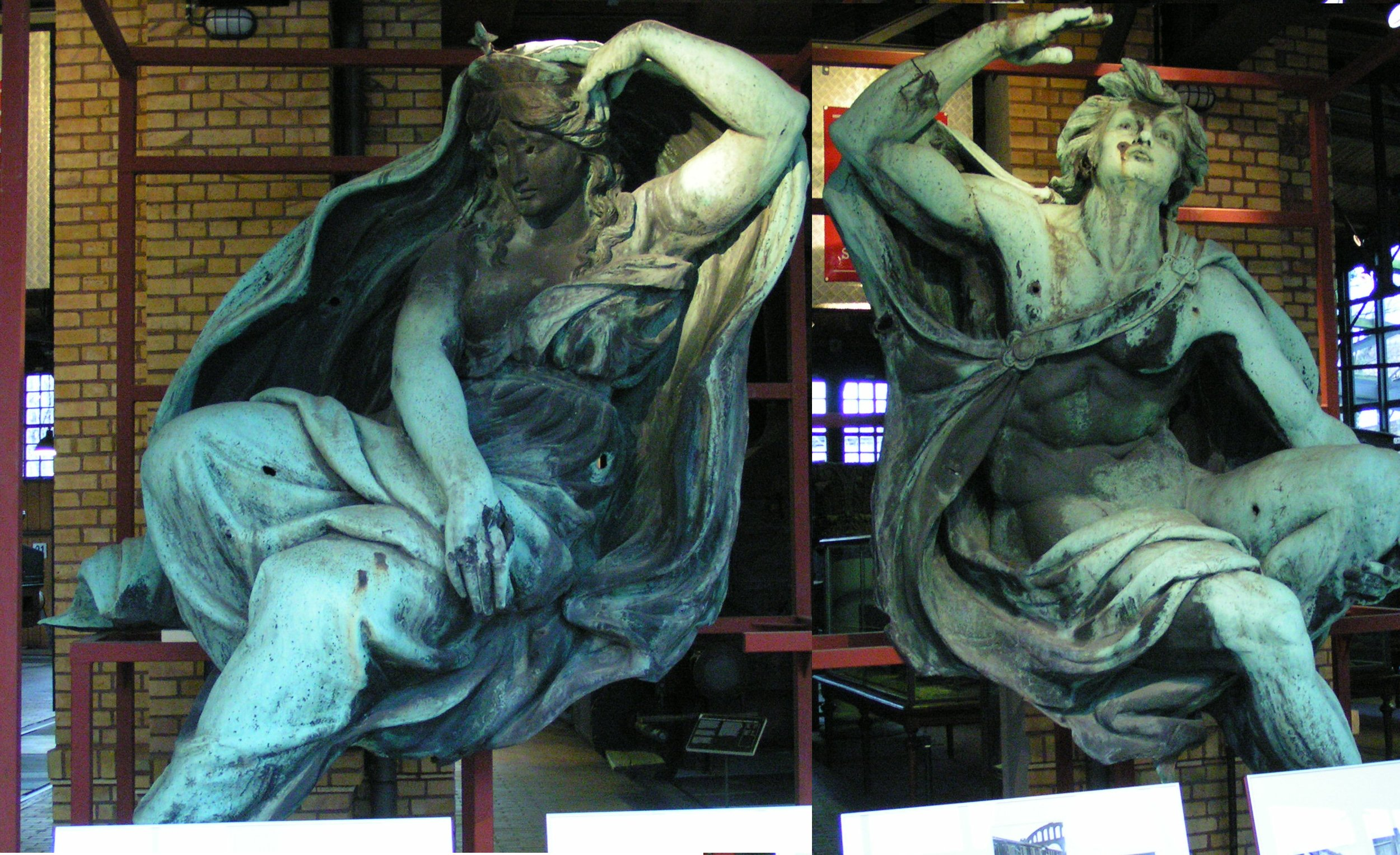
Anhalter Bahnhof 2003. The original Day and Night sculptures from the façade.

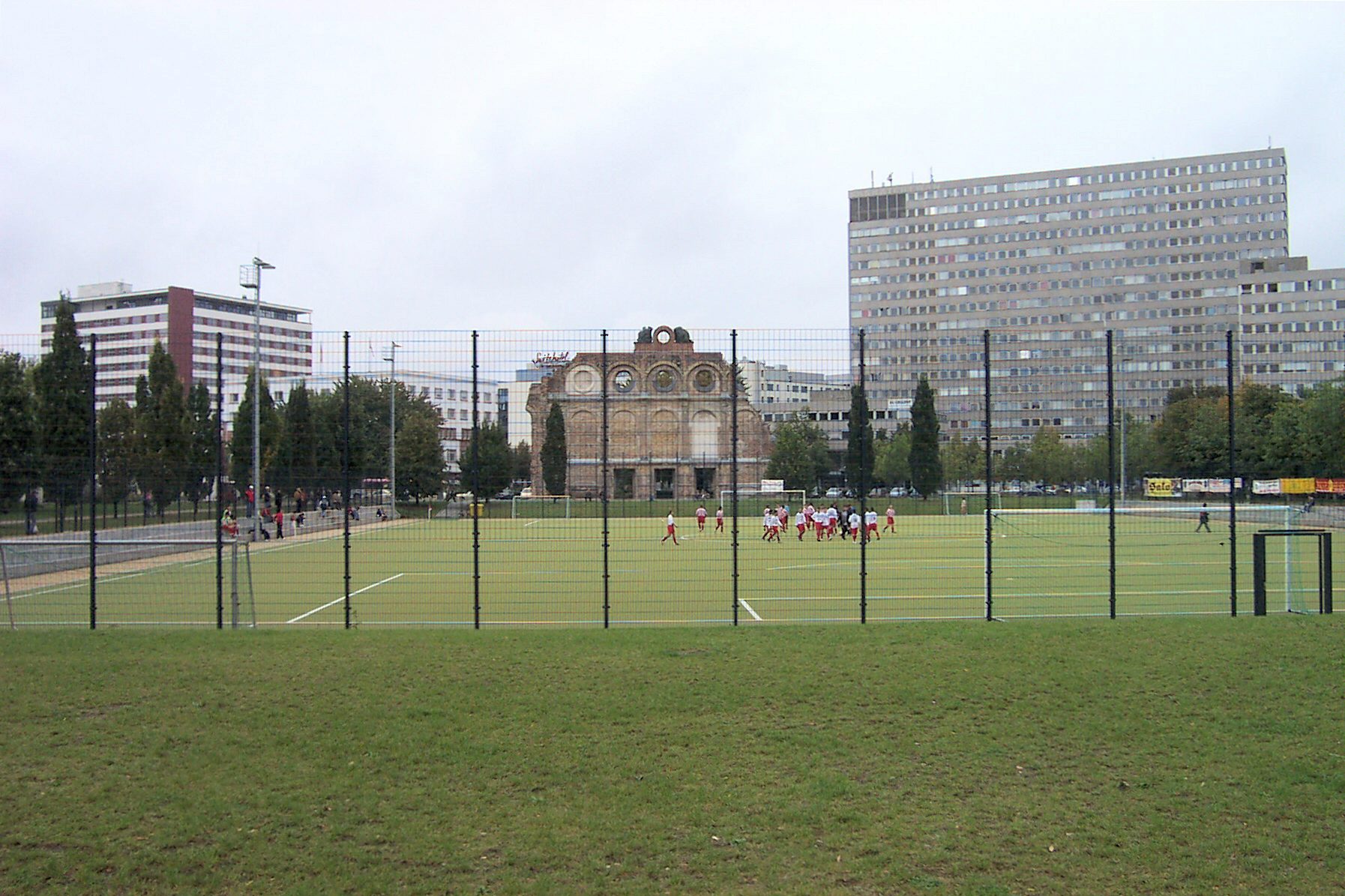
The site of the train shed in 2005, the Excelsiorhaus in the background

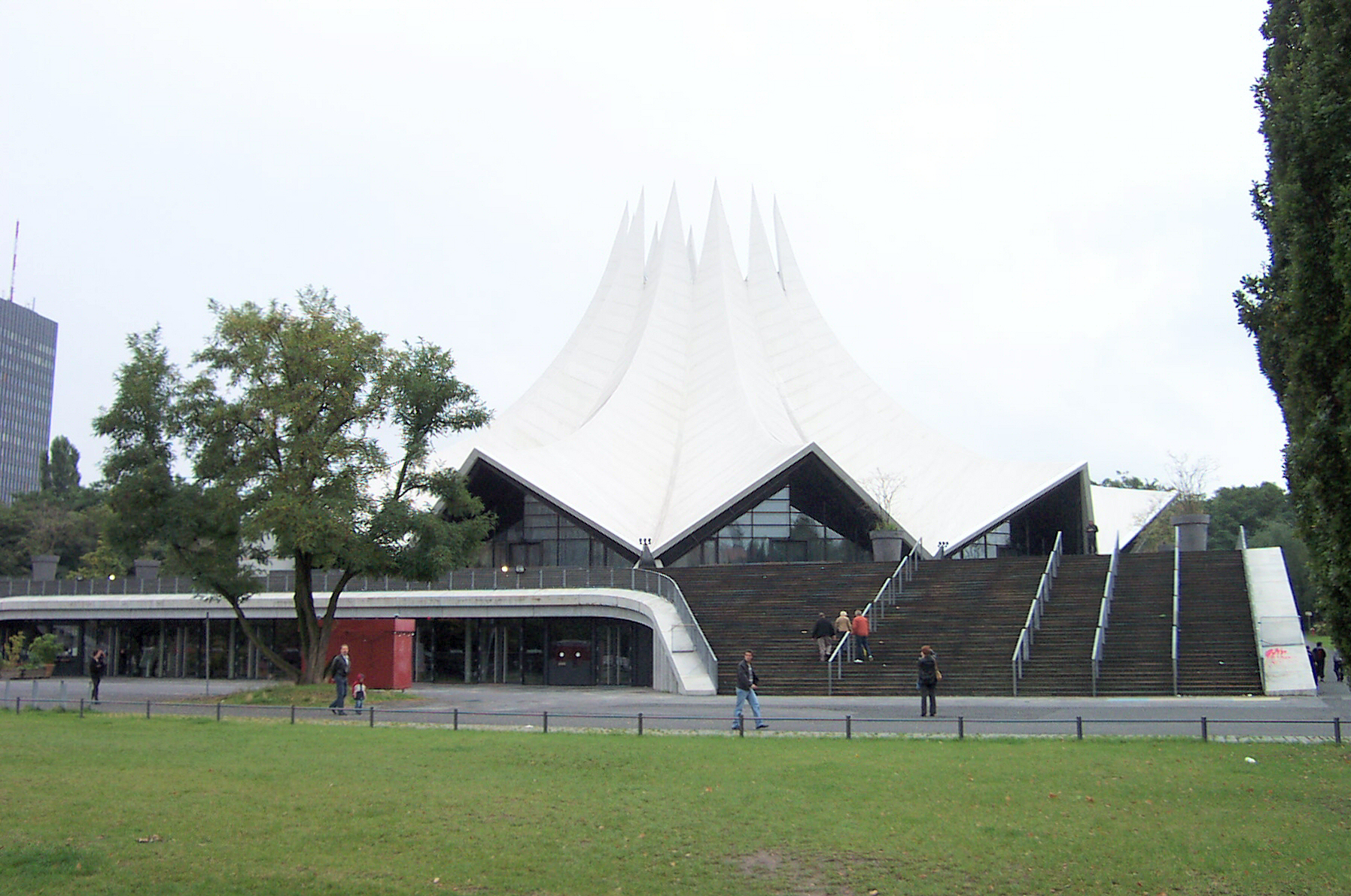
Anhalter Bahnhof 2005 - The Tempodrom.

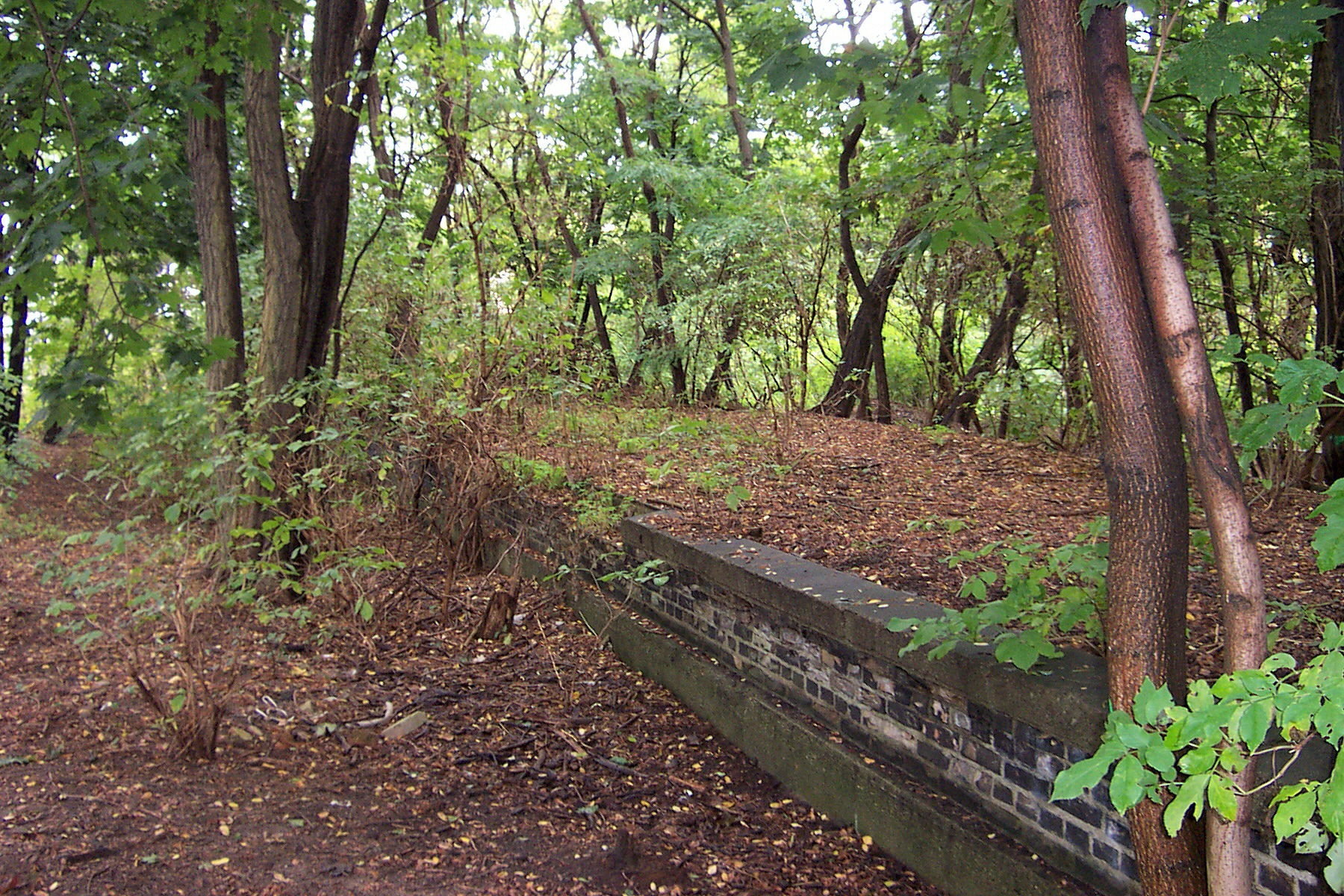
Anhalter Bahnhof 2005. Platform remains - one of several sections still visible in the undergrowth.

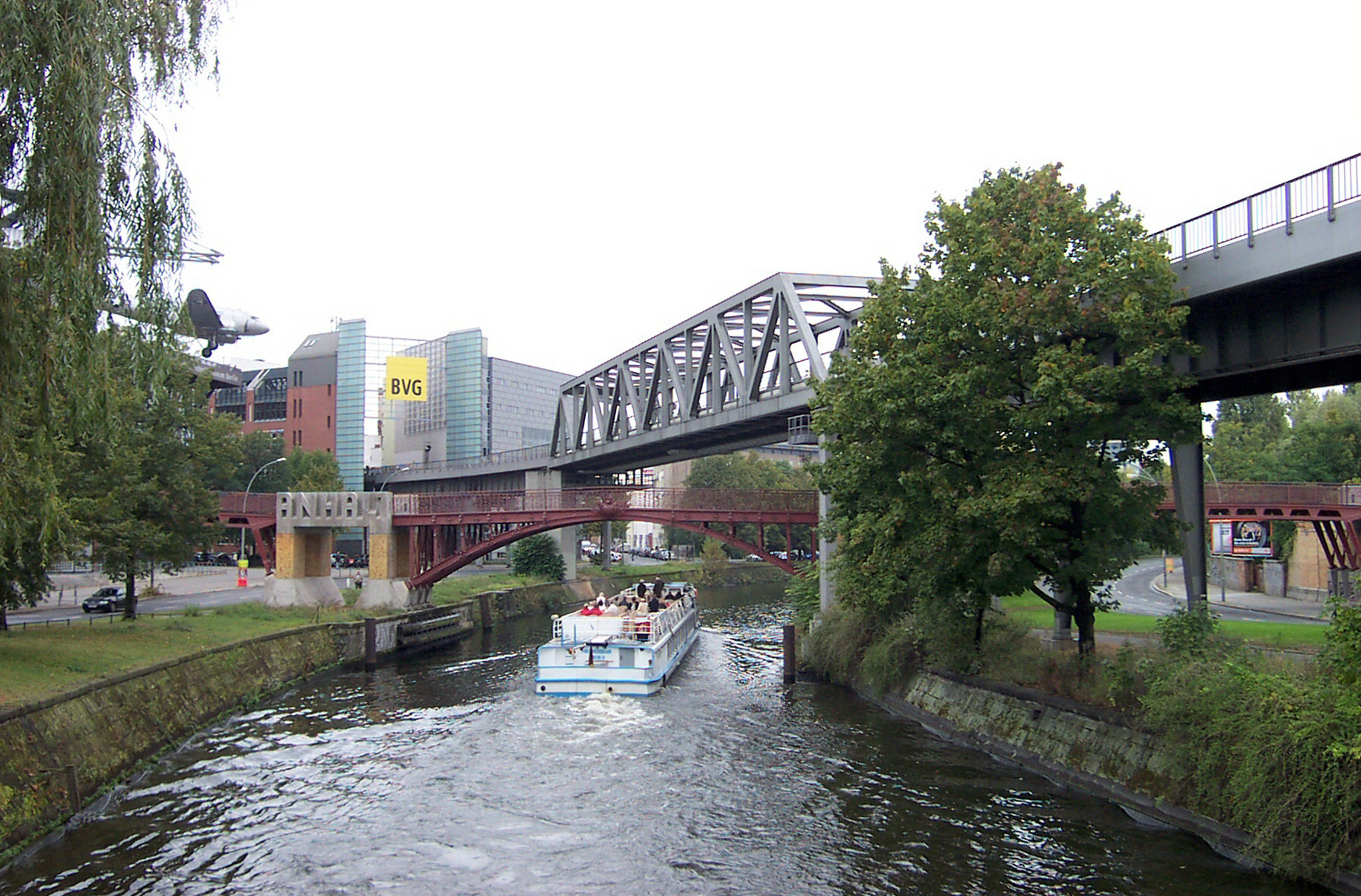
The Landwehr Canal, at the point where the lines into the Anhalter Bahnhof once crossed it, photographed in 2005

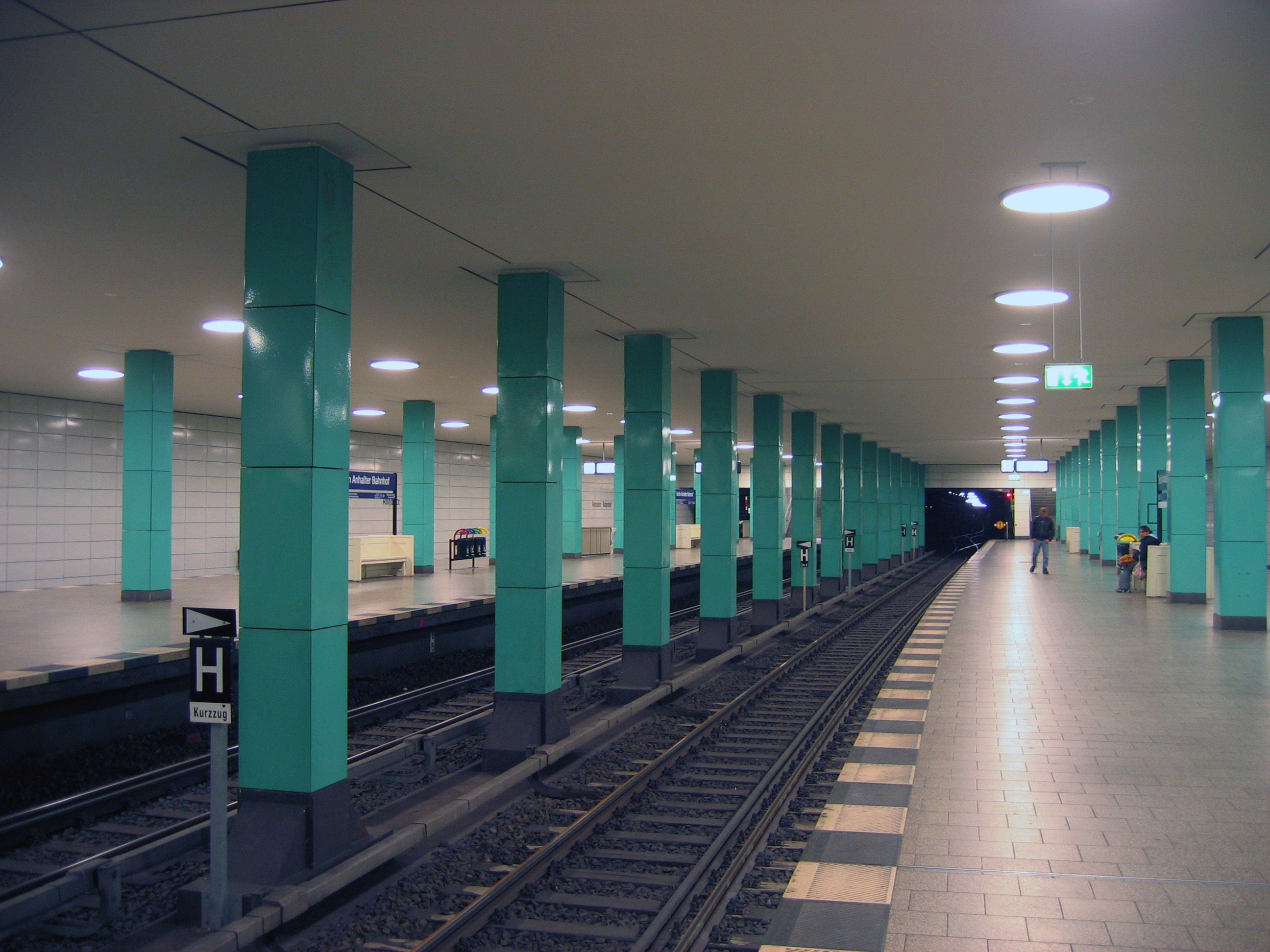
Platform.

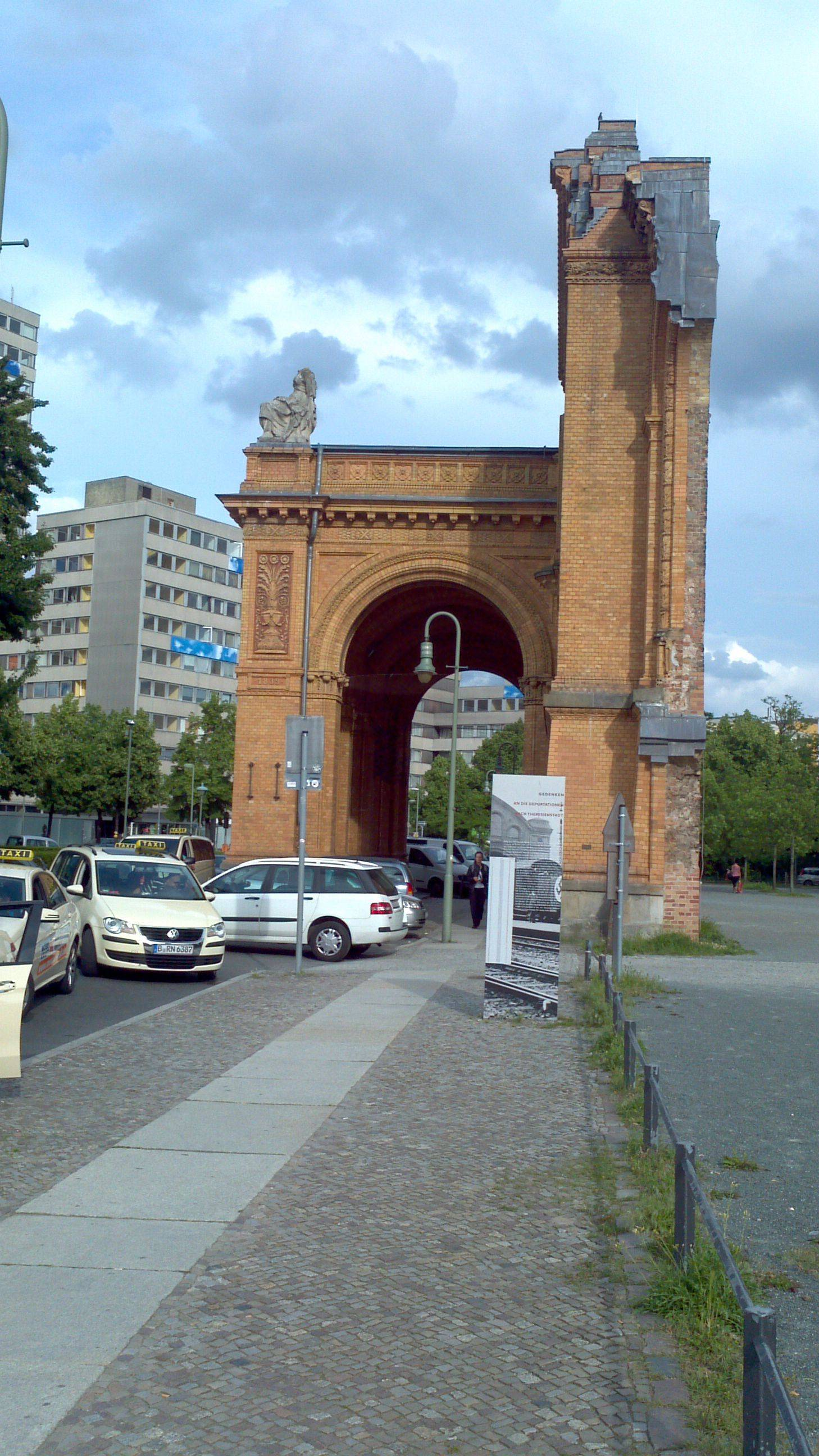
Monument.

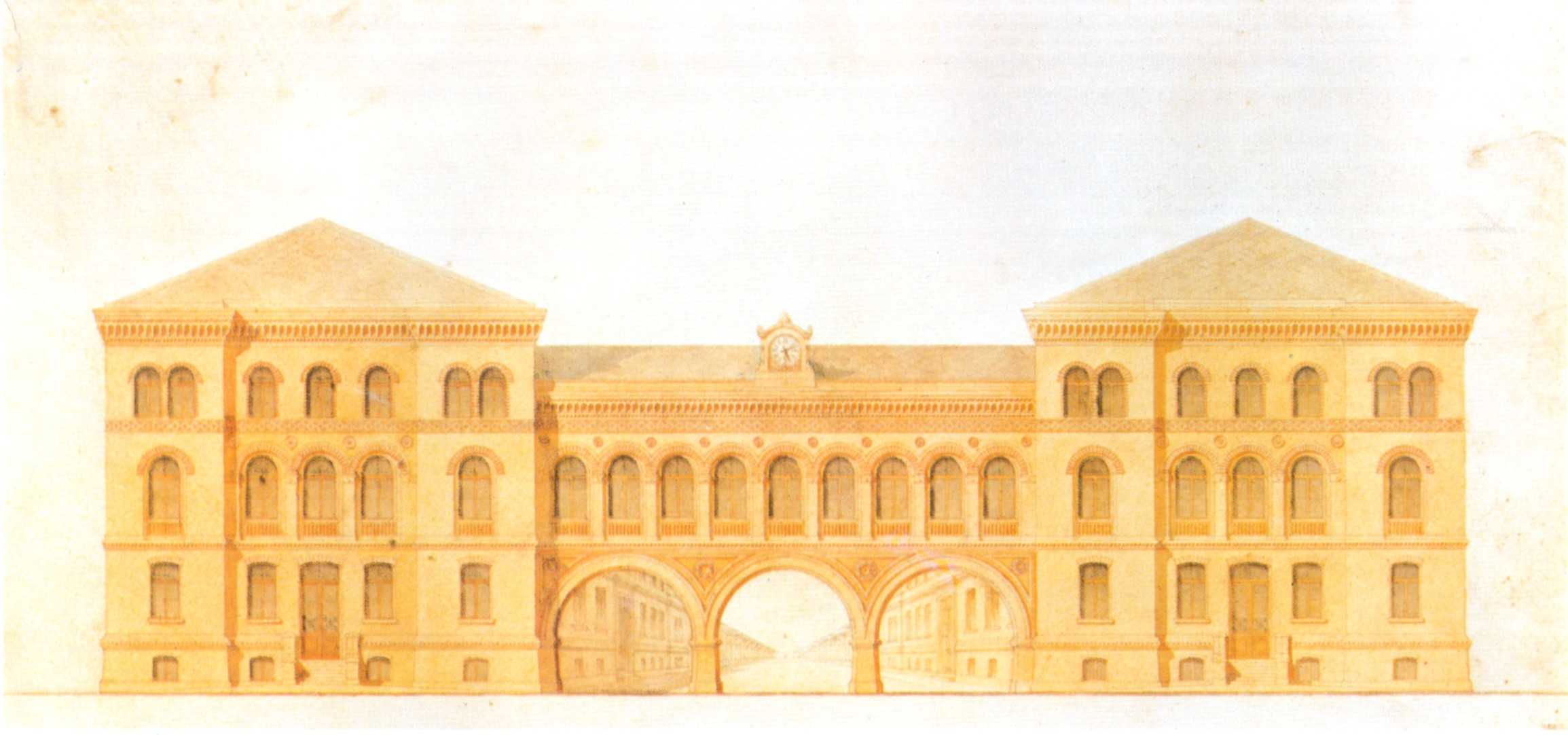
Anhalter Güterbahnhof (Goods Station). Architect Franz Schwechten's original elevation from 1874. Note the loading road visible through the arches.

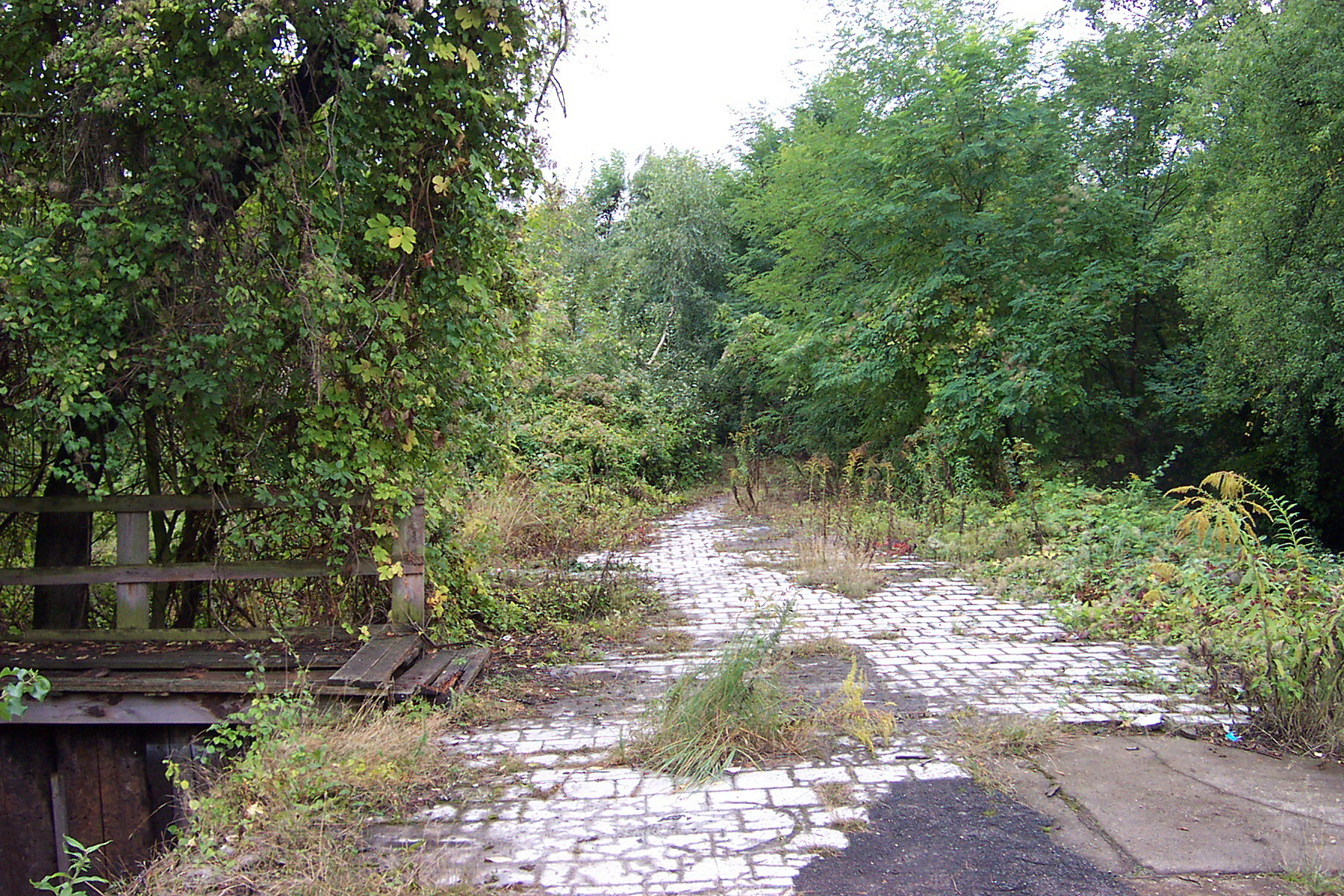
Anhalter Güterbahnhof 2005 - part of the overgrown area further south.

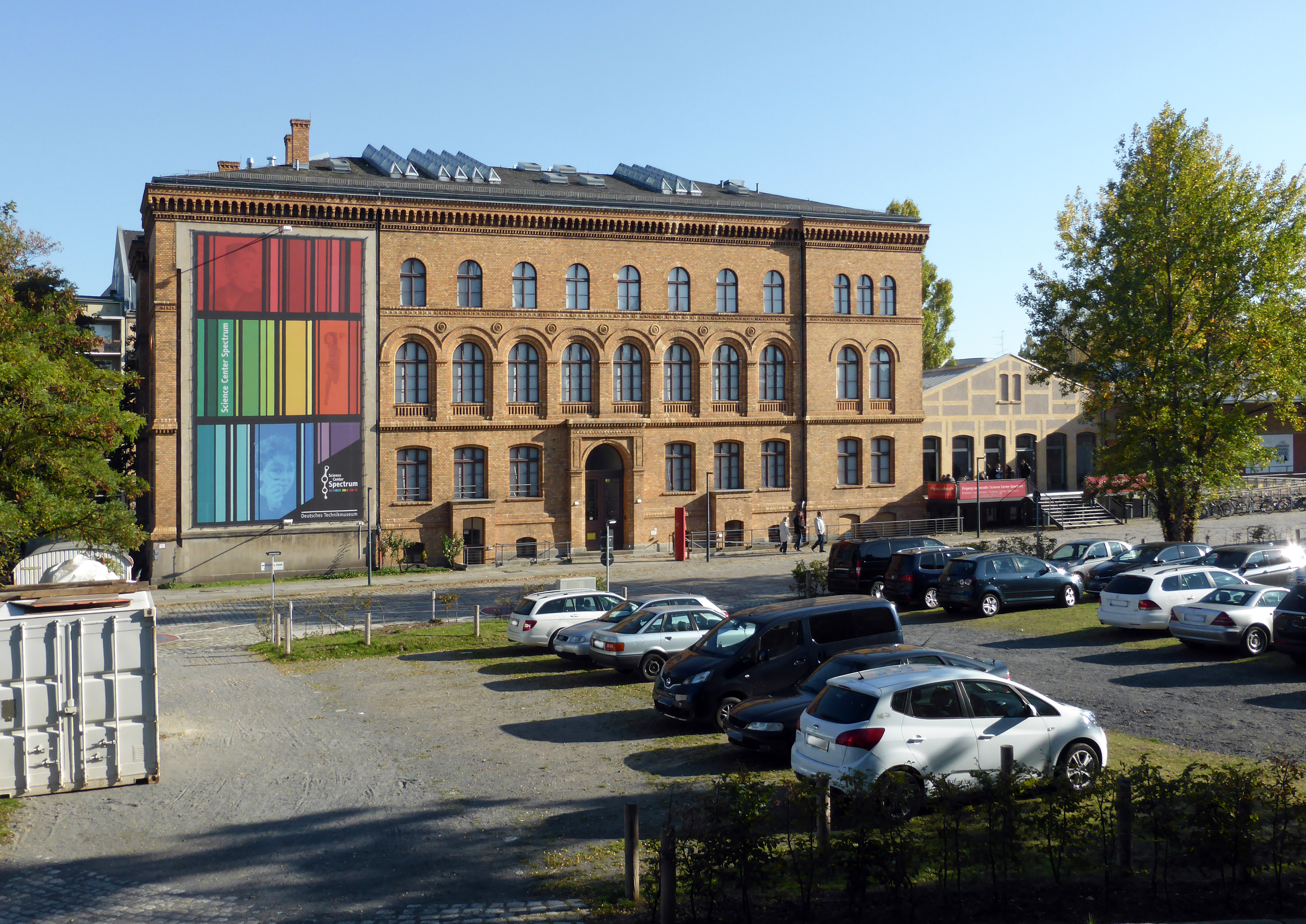
Surviving administration block of the Anhalter Güterbahnhof, now the Science Center Spectrum of the German Museum of Technology

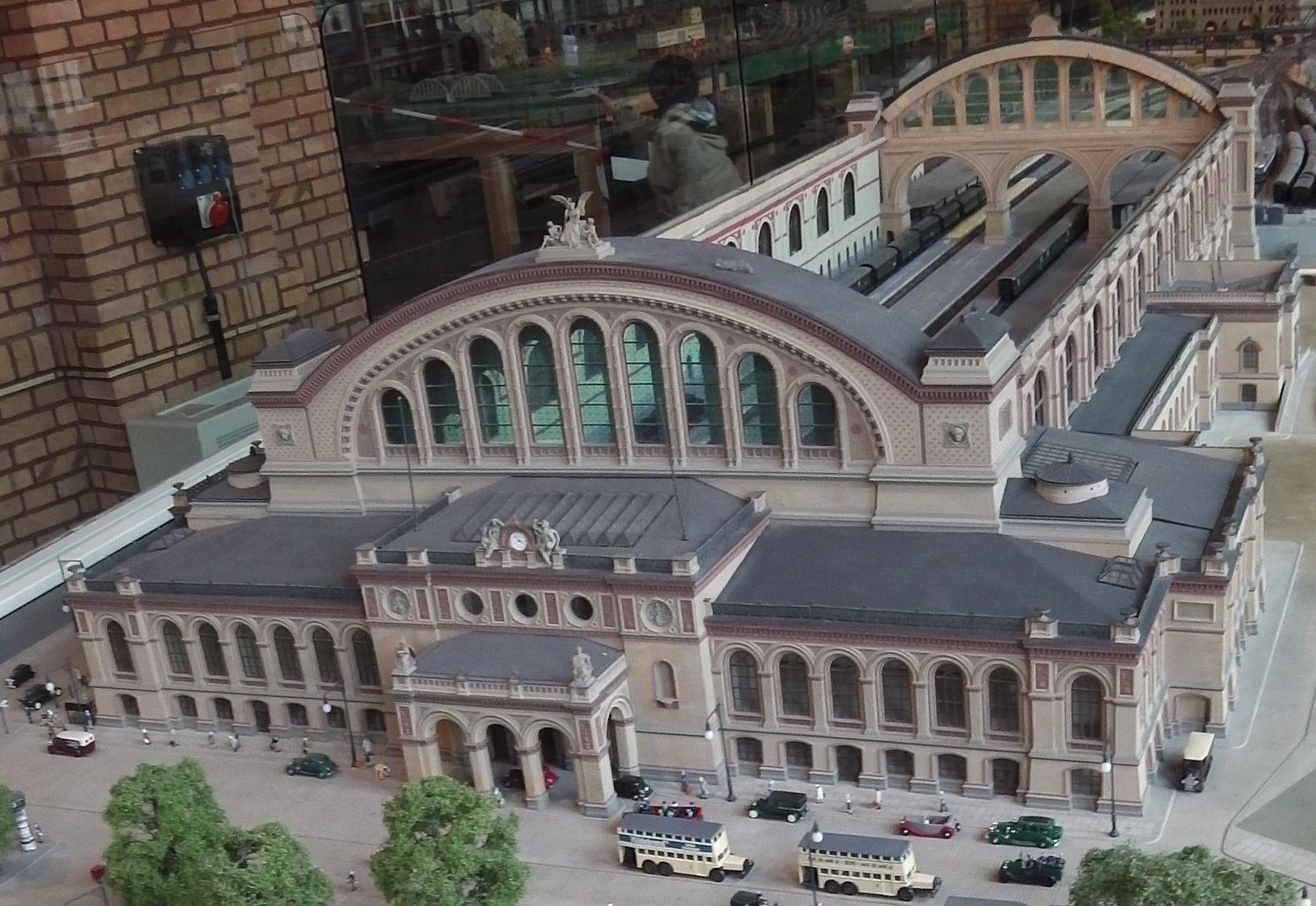
Model of the station as it appeared before World War II

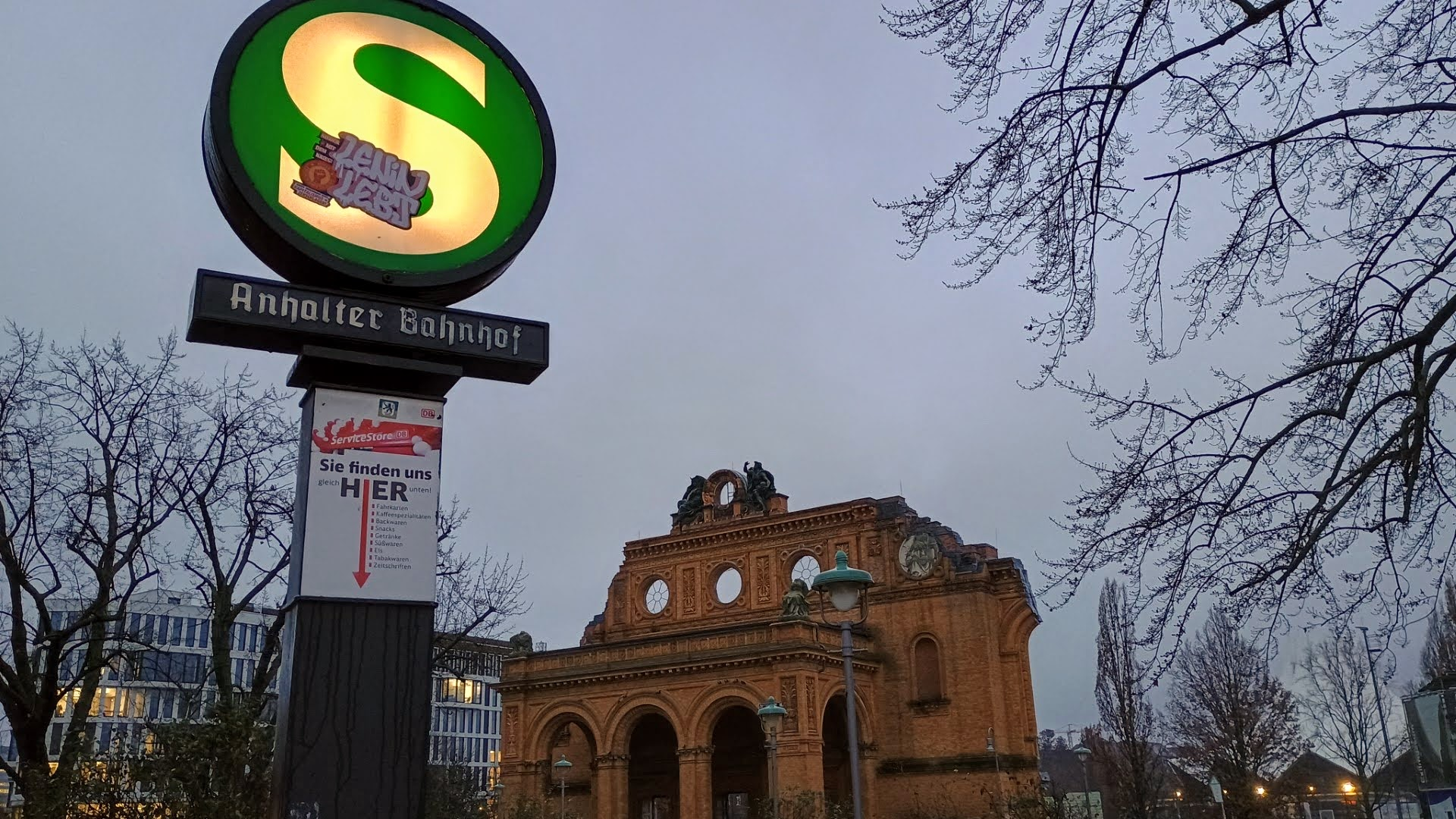
S-bahn entry sign at Anhalter Bahnhof (2024)

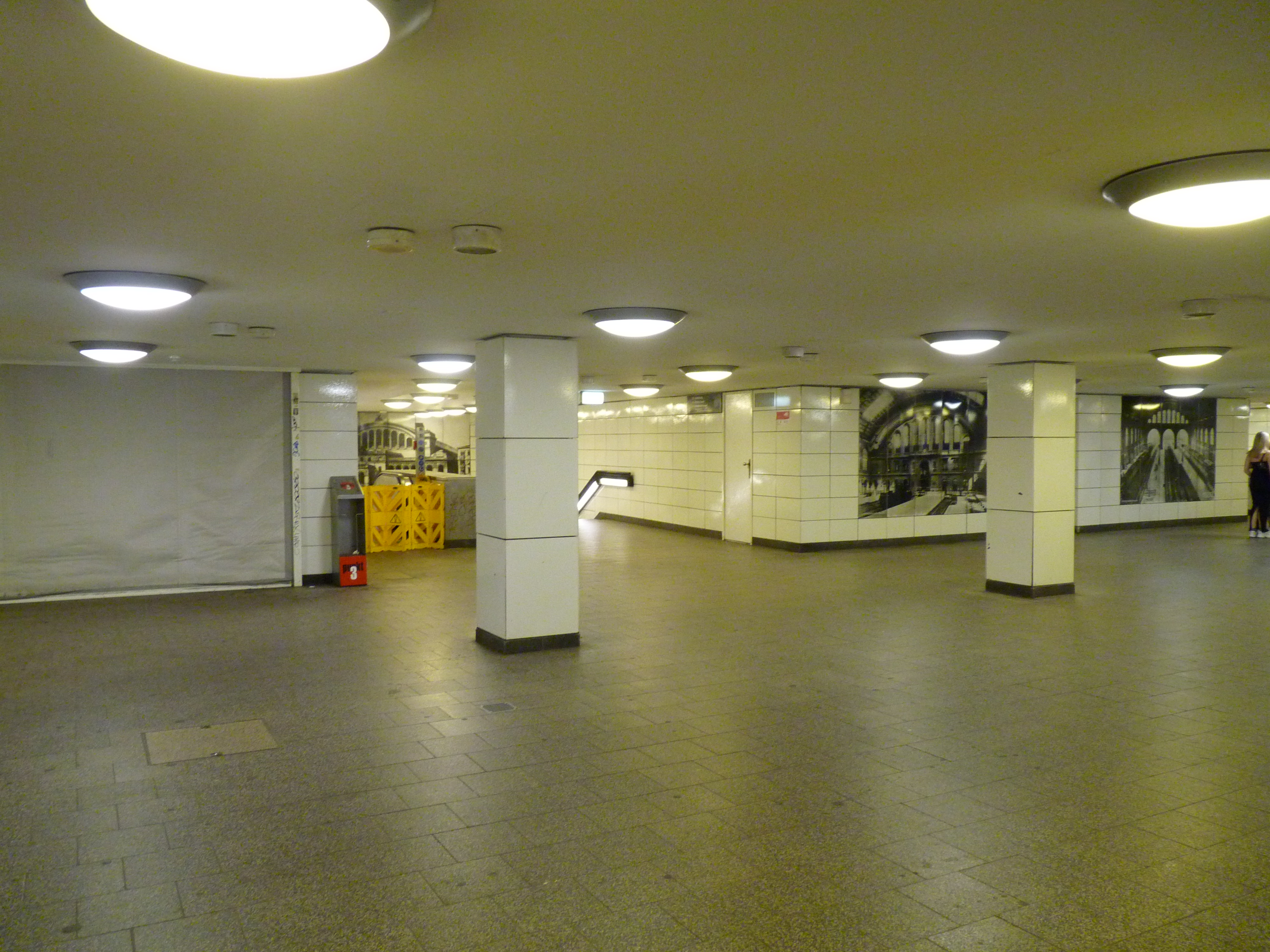
Station concourse (2025)

== Sources ==
- Knothe, Rainer (1997). Anhalter Bahnhof Entwicklung und Betrieb Zeugen und Zeugnisse aus über hundert Jahren. ISBN 978-3-88255-681-0.
- Maier, Helmut (1983). Berlin Anhalter Bahnhof. ISBN 978-3-88245-108-5.
- Alfred B. Gottwaldt (1994). Berlin, Anhalter Bahnhof. ISBN 978-3-87094-226-7.
- Peter G. Kliem (1984). Berlin Anhalter Bahnhof. ISBN 3-550-07964-8.
