= Coalition for International Justice =

International non-profit organization

The Coalition for International Justice (CIJ) was an international, non-profit organization based in both Washington D.C. and The Hague that supported the international war crimes tribunals for Rwanda and the former Yugoslavia, and criminal and transitional justice initiatives for East Timor, Sierra Leone, Cambodia, and Sudan. CIJ initiated and conducted advocacy and public education campaigns, targeting decision-makers in Washington and other capitals, media, and the public.

In the field, CIJ provided practical assistance on legal, technical, and outreach matters to the tribunals and other justice initiatives. From 2000 to 2003, CIJ conducted a substantial rule of law project in East Timor. Most recently, in July 2004, CIJ assembled an international team of professionals who conducted over 1,200 interviews in Chad with refugees who had fled the conflict in Darfur, Sudan.

On March 31, 2006, the Coalition for Justice closed operations. In a letter from its board of directors, they noted that CIJ "was not intended to become a permanent institution."
