= Center for Human Rights & Humanitarian Law =

The Center for Human Rights and Humanitarian Law at American University Washington College of Law (AUWCL) was founded in 1990 as a way to coordinate all the human rights and humanitarian law activities at AUWCL. The center's objective is "to work with students, faculty and the international legal community to provide scholarship and support for human rights initiatives around the world."

The center has founded and administered expansive programming on emerging human rights issues, focused on core areas including the human rights of persons with disabilities, human rights in business, human rights education, and the Anti-Torture Initiative, designed to support the mandate of the UN Special Rapporteur on Torture through the development of a model for effective in-country follow-up, and through monitoring and assessing implementation of the recommendations of the Committee Against Torture.

Each year the center also co-hosts the Human Rights Film Series with the American University's Center for Media and Social Impact to demonstrate how film can be used as a tool to promote human rights. In addition, the center hosts 50-70 events throughout the academic year, including panel discussions, lectures by human rights practitioners, and seminars for law students interested in human rights. Beyond that, the Center co-sponsors human rights event series organized by other organizations.

The current Faculty Director is legal scholar Macarena Sáez, who was appointed in Sept 2015.

== See also ==
- Washington College of Law
- American University
- Human Rights
- Humanitarian Law
