= Berlin-Friedrichshagen station =

Railway station in Berlin, Germany

Berlin Friedrichshagen
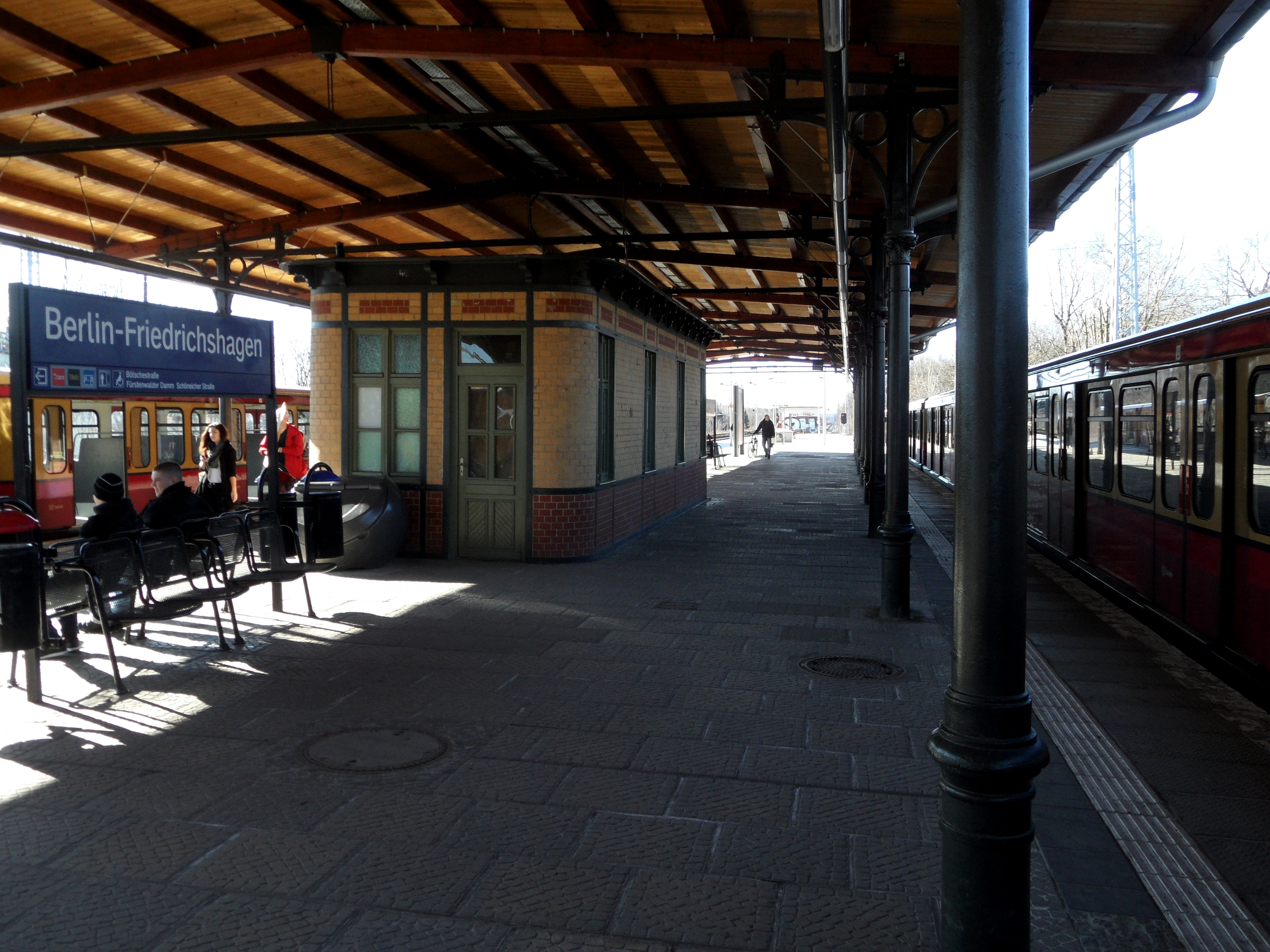
- Platform

General information
- Location: Fürstenwalder Damm 484, Friedrichshagen, Treptow-Köpenick, Berlin; Germany
- Coordinates: 52°27′27″N 13°37′24″E
- Line: Berlin–Guben (km 14.7)
- Platforms: 2

Construction
- Accessible: Yes
- Architect: Karl Cornelius; Waldemar Suadicani

Other information
- Station code: 5100
- DS100 code: BFRH
- IBNR: 8089060
- Category: 4
- Fare zone: VBB: Berlin B/5656
- Website: www.bahnhof.de

History
- Opened: 23 October 1842

Services
| Preceding station | Berlin S-Bahn | Following station |
|---|---|---|
| Hirschgarten towards Spandau | S3 | Rahnsdorf towards Erkner |
Location

Berlin-Friedrichshagen station is a station of the Berlin S-Bahn in district of Friedrichshagen in the Berlin district of Treptow-Köpenick. It is located north of the village of Friedrichshagen on the Berlin-Frankfurt (Oder) railway.

== History ==
The station was opened on 23 October 1842 with the Berlin–Frankfurt (Oder) railway. With the development of the line to include a pair of suburban tracks to the north of the mainline tracks, the station was raised, along with the line, by about six metres to enable the removal of level crossings in 1903. The station building of that time still exists and the island platform has a typical Berlin canopy supported by pillars. The architects of the infrastructure were Charles Cornelius and Waldemar Suadicani who designed the other S-Bahn stations along the line. The station building is heritage-listed. East of the station there is a two-track reversing facility, which was built to allow trains to terminate and reverse.

The "great electrification" of the line to Erkner allowed electrical operations to commence on 11 June 1928, while some steam-powered suburban trains continued to run until October of the same year. Since 1 December 1930 the electrical services have been branded as the S-Bahn.

After the end of World War II, the suburban line to Erkner was completely dismantled. While on most other lines one suburban and one long-distance track were dismantled, the Soviet military administration decided that the dismantling of both S-Bahn tracks was needed for war reparations so that two railway tracks of the Berlin–Wrocław railway would remain open for long-distance traffic. Once sufficient capacity had become available, it was determined in 1948 that the reconstruction of one track could be carried out. By 30 April, the line was reopened for electric train operations via Friedrichshagen to Rahnsdorf. The tracks for this work partly came from dismantled sections of the two tracks of the Prussian Eastern Railway. The second S-Bahn track was restored at the station in 1957.

== Passenger services ==
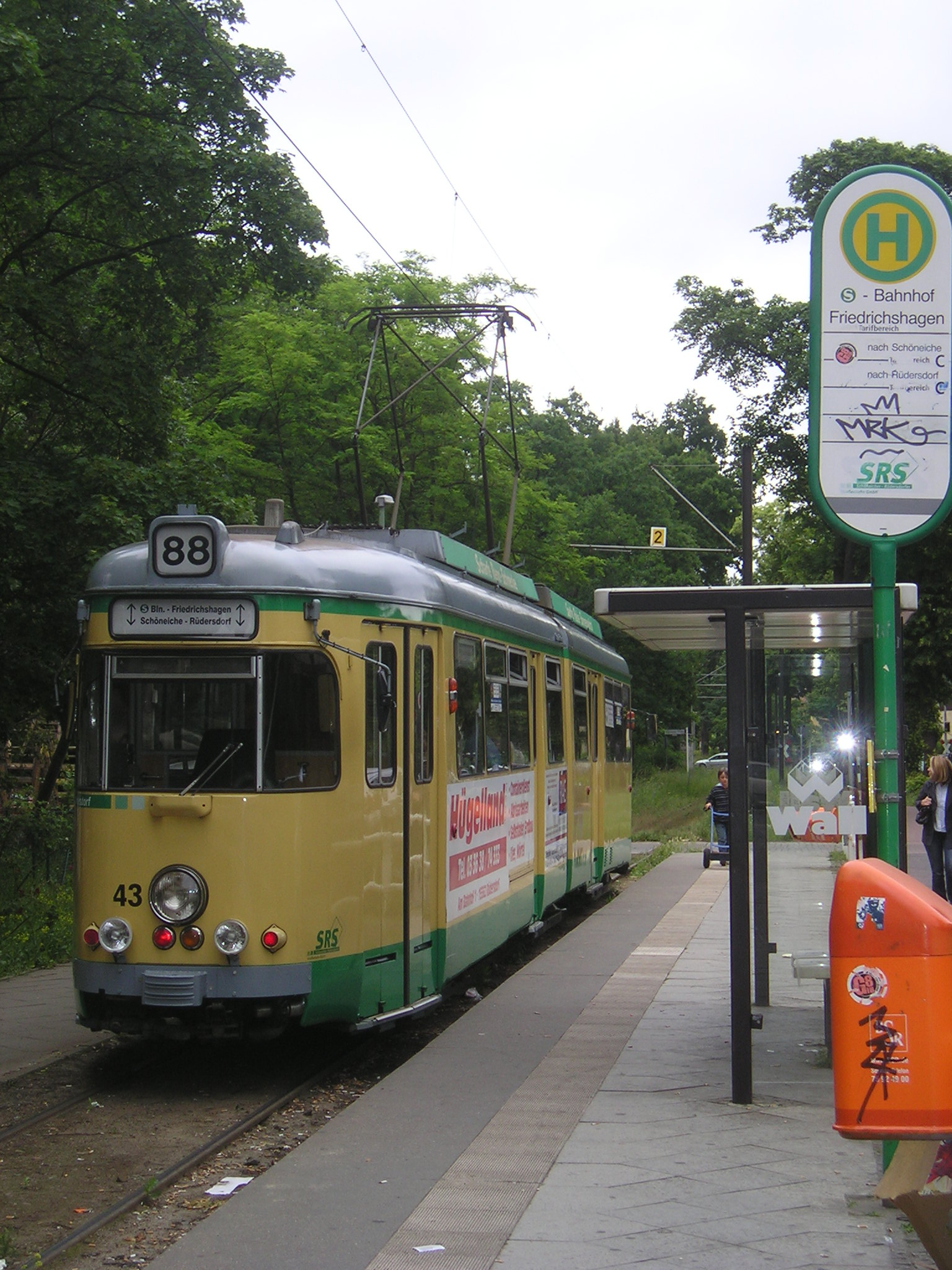
Friedrichshagen terminus of the Schöneiche-Rüdersdorf tramway

The station is served by Berlin S-Bahn line S3 between Erkner and Ostkreuz. Services operate at 10-minute intervals towards central Berlin, but only every second train continues towards Erkner outside the peak. In the summer months the 10-minute interval service continues to Erkner.

South of the station there is a stop for tram lines 60 and 61 and north of it is the terminus of tram line 88 (the Schöneiche-Rüdersdorf Tramway).

| Service | Route |
|---|---|
| S3 | Ostkreuz – Rummelsburg – Betriebsbahnhof Rummelsburg – Karlshorst – Wuhlheide – Köpenick – Hirschgarten – Friedrichshagen – Rahnsdorf – Wilhelmshagen – Erkner |
