= Berlin-Rummelsburg railway station =

Railway station in Berlin, Germany

Berlin Rummelsburg
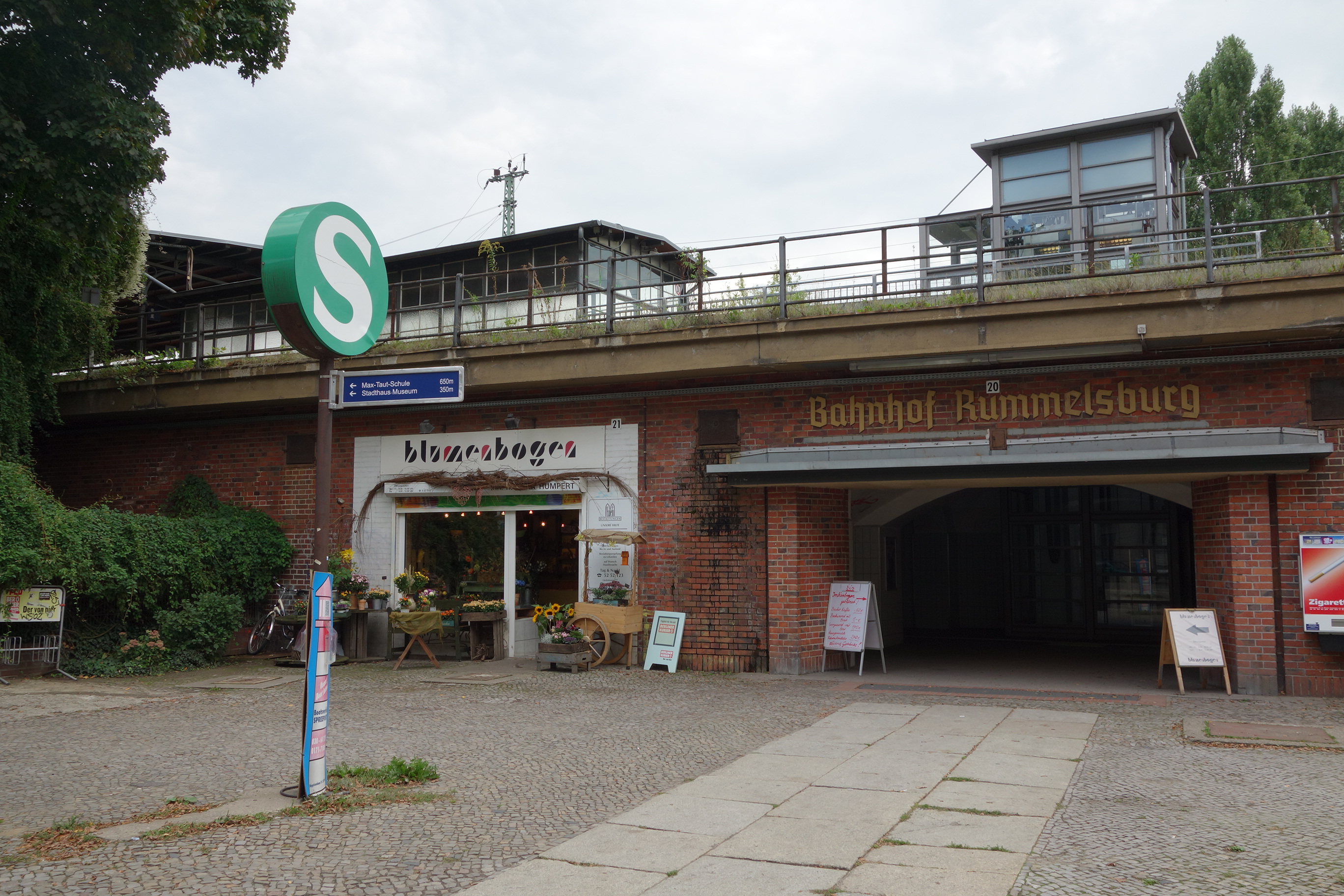
- Main entrance on Nöldnerstraße

General information
- Location: Rummelsburg, Lichtenberg, Berlin; Germany
- Coordinates: 52°30′04″N 13°28′43″E
- Line: Berlin–Guben (KBS 200.3)
- Platforms: 2 (S-Bahn)
- Train operators: S-Bahn Berlin
- Connections: S3

Construction
- Accessible: Yes

Other information
- Station code: 556
- DS100 code: BRH
- IBNR: 8089084
- Category: 4
- Fare zone: VBB: Berlin B/5656
- Website: www.bahnhof.de

History
- Opened: 1882 as Kietz-Rummelsburg; 1901 or 1902 at current location

Services
Preceding station	Berlin S-Bahn	Following station
Ostkreuz towards Spandau	S3	Rummelsburg Betriebsbahnhof towards Erkner
Location
- Location within Berlin

Berlin-Rummelsburg station is a station in the suburb of Rummelsburg in the Lichtenberg district of Berlin. The station is located on the Berlin–Frankfurt (Oder) railway (“Lower Silesian–Markish Railway”) and is served by line S3 of the Berlin S-Bahn.

It is not to be confused with Berlin-Rummelsburg Betriebsbahnhof, which lies further east and was formerly a freight yard and is now used for the maintenance of long-distance trains. Berlin-Rummelsburg Betriebsbahnhof S-Bahn station is also in the precinct of that station.

== Location and construction ==
The S-Bahn station is located at kilometre 3.2 of the Berlin–Frankfurt (Oder) railway. The entrance from Nöldnerstraße and Hauptstraße connects with the western end of the platform. The station includes an island platform, but it has no independent entrance building as facilities for passenger handling are located in the entrance passage. This was built within the rail viaduct. A lift provides barrier-free access to the platform.

The mainline tracks of the Berlin–Frankfurt (Oder) railway and a connecting track to the Berlin-Rummelsburg Betriebsbahnhof depot run to south of the S-Bahn station.

== History ==
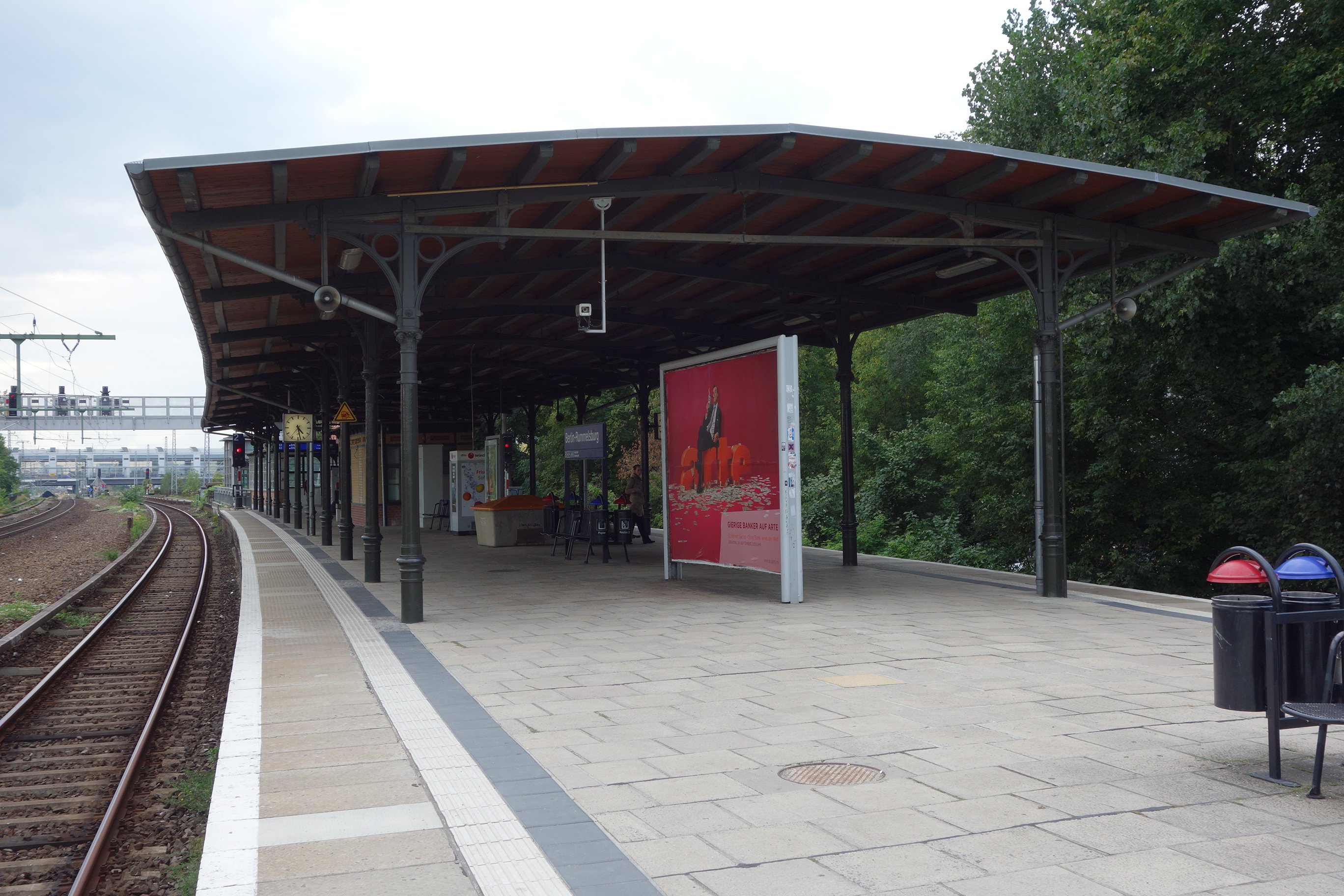
Platform

The first station, located east of the current Schlichtallee, was put into operation in 1882 under the name of Kietz-Rummelsburg. In 1901 or 1902, the railway line was raised from ground level and placed on a viaduct and the station was built in its current location. In addition, bridges were built over the nearby Karlhorster Strasse, immediately to the west of the station. In 1914, the station was given its current name of Rummelsburg.

On 11 June 1928, the first electric suburban trains served the station and they were branded as the Berlin S-Bahn from 1 December 1930. As a result of the Second World War, Deutsche Reichsbahn ceased services at the station in April 1945. The first services were restored on 5 January 1948. The station received a southern entrance on Hauptstraße in 1984.

Modification of the viaduct arches of the mainline tracks and the entire track infrastructure in this area is planned in the coming years as part of the redevelopment of the Ostkreuz station.

== Passenger services ==
Berlin-Rummelsburg station is served by line S3 between Berlin Ostkreuz and Erkner. Next to Nöldnerstraße there is a bus stop and bicycle parking and on Hauptstraße, there is a stop on tram line 21. Bus routes 194, 240 and N94, operated by Berliner Verkehrsbetriebe (Berlin Transport Company), serve the station.

Service	Route
S3	Ostkreuz – Rummelsburg – Betriebsbahnhof Rummelsburg – Karlshorst – Wuhlheide – Köpenick – Hirschgarten – Friedrichshagen – Rahnsdorf – Wilhelmshagen – Erkner

== See also ==
- List of railway stations in Berlin
