= Berlin-Köpenick station =

Train station in Berlin

Berlin Köpenick
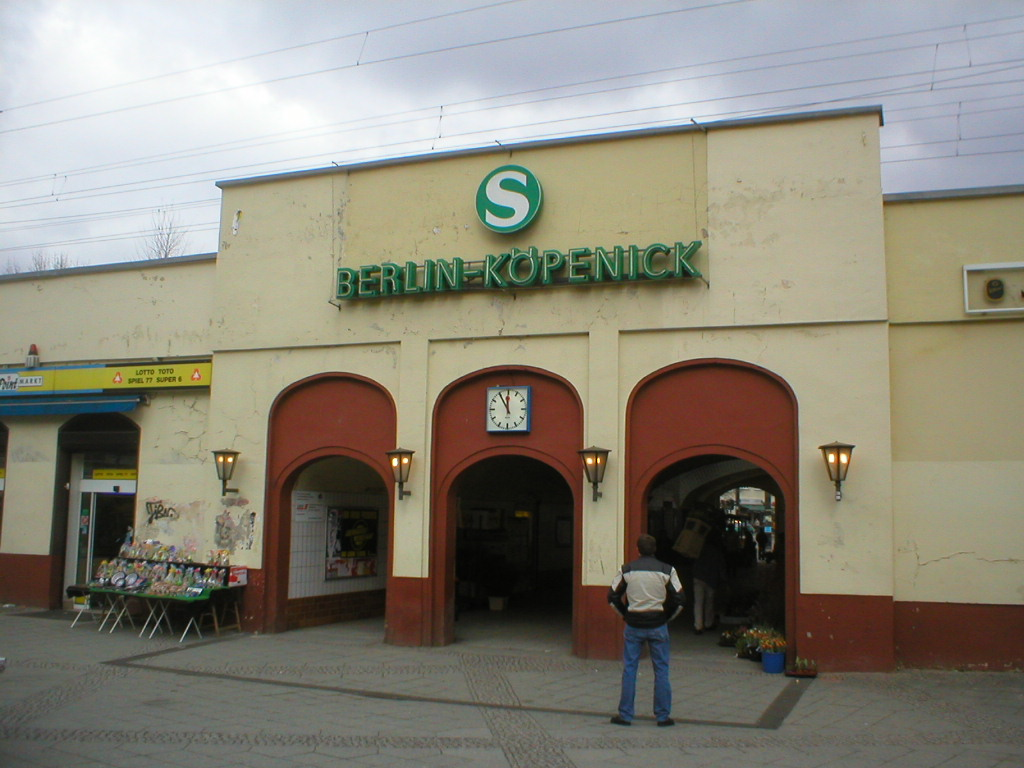
- Entrance to Berlin-Köpenick

General information
- Location: Bahnhofstr. 1, Treptow-Köpenick, Berlin; Germany
- Coordinates: 52°27′31″N 13°34′51″E
- Owner: Deutsche Bahn
- Operator: DB Station&Service
- Line: Berlin–Guben (KBS 200.3)
- Platforms: 2
- Train operators: S-Bahn Berlin

Construction
- Accessible: Yes
- Architect: Karl Cornelius; Waldemar Suadicani

Other information
- Station code: 548
- DS100 code: *BKP long distance: BKPK S-Bahn
- IBNR: 8089069
- Category: 4
- Fare zone: VBB: Berlin B/5656
- Website: www.bahnhof.de

History
- Opened: 23 October 1842

Services
Preceding station	Berlin S-Bahn	Following station
Wuhlheide towards Spandau	S3	Hirschgarten towards Erkner
Location
- Location within Berlin

Berlin-Köpenick station is a station of the Berlin S-Bahn in the Berlin district of Treptow-Köpenick. It is a two-track through station located at Bahnhofstrasse and Elcknerplatz on the Berlin-Frankfurt (Oder) railway ("Lower Silesian–Markish Railway").

== History ==
The station was opened on 23 October 1842 with the Berlin–Frankfurt (Oder) railway. The station was then only a few kilometres from the then independent town of Köpenick. A road was built between the town and the station, which is now called Bahnhofstrasse (station street).

Between 1899 and 1902, the station facilities were completely rebuilt for the increasing traffic. A pair of suburban tracks was laid to the north of the mainline tracks. The whole complex was built on an embankment to pass over the streets. A new entrance building was built for the Königlichen Eisenbahn-Direktion (railway division of) Berlin to a design by the architects Charles Cornelius and Waldemar Suadicani. The station has since possessed an island platform of typical Berlin design, a three-track reversing facility for suburban trains located to the east and a freight loading point on the long-distance tracks.

A horse tramway connected the station with the centre of Köpenick from 1883 and was converted to electric operation in 1903.

On 11 June 1928, a 750 volt third rail, installed at the side of the track, was brought into operation on the suburban tracks. Since initially insufficient trains were available for electrical operations, mixed diesel and electrical operations continued until 20 March 1929. The electrification involved extensive work, including the adaptation of the signalling and the raising of the heights of platforms from 760 to 960 millimetres. A sub-station was built west of the station. This electric suburban service has been branded as the S-Bahn since 1 December 1930.

=== 1930s to the post-war period ===
The Germania plan of the Nazis envisaged the upgrading of the line to Köpenick to six tracks, as a long-distance S-Bahn service (similar to the modern Regional-Express trains) would run between Köpenick and Ostkreuz and cover the nearly ten kilometre-long route without stopping. In addition, a direct connection for long-distance trains would have been provided because of the outbreak of the Second World War.

After the end of the war some tracks were dismantled by the Soviet military administration for war reparations. In the Berlin area this mostly involved the dismantling of one long-distance and one S-Bahn track. However, since the Berlin–Wrocław railway represented the main railway towards the Soviet Union, both S-Bahn tracks were dismantled rather than a long-distance track. Three years later, however, a single S-Bahn track was restored for electrical operations to Köpenick in January 1948 and as far as Erkner in November 1948. The second track was restored through Köpenick in 1957.

=== Present and future ===
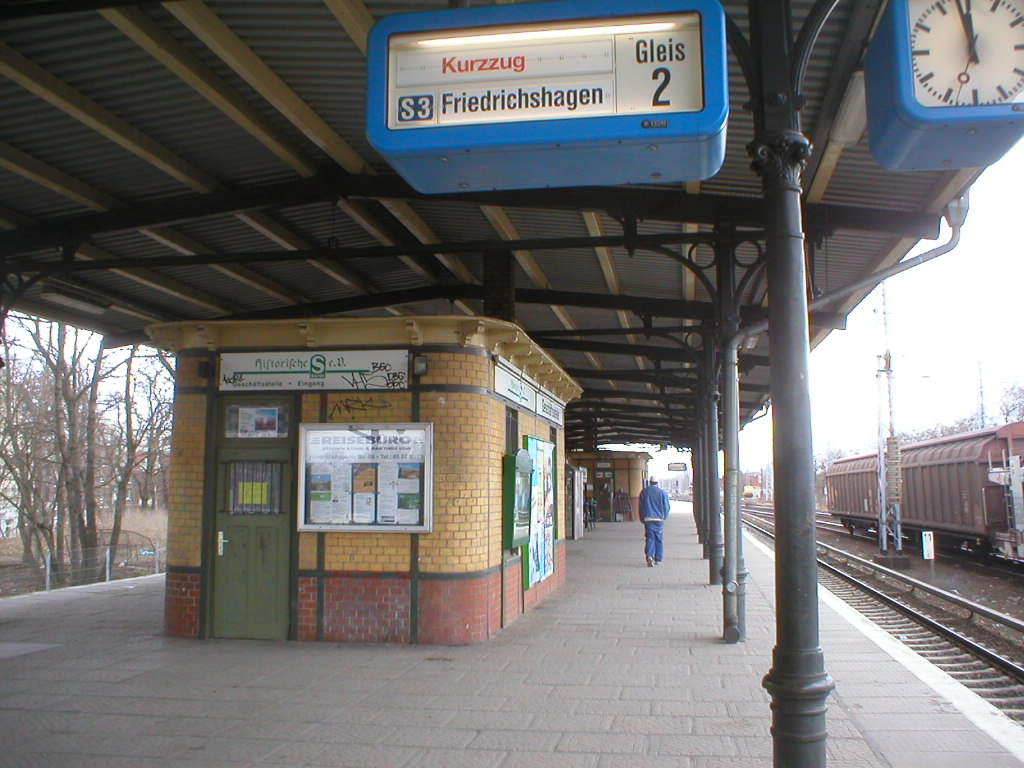
S-Bahn platforms in 2005

The city development plan traffic for Berlin includes a plan for the building of a Regionalbahn platform in Köpenick. This would replace the existing Regionalbahn station of Karlshorst. The latter was established after the building of the Berlin Wall as a temporary long-distance station. The proposal is supported by several parties, including the nearby Forum Köpenick shopping centre and football club 1.FC Union Berlin, whose expansion plans of their Stadion an der Alten Försterei rely on the additional transport capacity of the expanded station. Originally Deutsche Bahn planned to carry out this work by 2007. Following financial difficulties and the resulting delay to the building of the Köpenick Regionalbahn station, the plans were resumed in 2011 after the Berlin Secretary of State, Maria Krautzberger had asked for a parliamentary inquiry into the prospects for the assumption of the costs by the state of Berlin. It was anticipated that the station would now be completed by 2015 and would still have two S-Bahn and two Regionalbahn platforms. One metre high noise barriers are planned to protect the residents of increased noise. The entrance from Elcknerplatz would be given a glass facade. In the current urban development program, however, funding is sought from the federal government, which opposed funding it. In response to a parliamentary question to the Berlin Transport Secretary, Christian Gaebler replied in April 2012 that the State of Berlin would fund the amount of €5 million and the first stage was included in the 2012/13 budget, but this has not yet been appropriated. Construction would start in 2017 with commissioning planned for 2019.

In the spring of 2013, modern, dynamic destination displays were installed in the station.

After funding was secured under the infrastructure project i2030 of the states Berlin and Brandenburg and planning was finished in 2022, construction at Berlin-Köpenick Station started in March 2023 and is set to continue until 2027.

== Passenger services ==
The station is served by Berlin S-Bahn line S3 between Erkner and Spandau. Services operate at 10-minute intervals between Ostbahnhof and Friedrichshagen.

Tram lines 62, 63 and 68 and several bus routes operated by Berliner Verkehrsbetriebe stop at the station.

Service	Route
S3	Ostkreuz – Rummelsburg – Betriebsbahnhof Rummelsburg – Karlshorst – Wuhlheide – Köpenick – Hirschgarten – Friedrichshagen – Rahnsdorf – Wilhelmshagen – Erkner
