= Berlin-Rahnsdorf station =

Railway station in Berlin, Germany

Rahnsdorf
- Entrance building

General information
- Location: Alter Fischerweg, Rahnsdorf, Treptow-Köpenick, Berlin; Germany
- Coordinates: 52°27′6″N 13°41′23″E
- Line: Berlin–Guben (KBS 200.3)
- Platforms: 2

Construction
- Accessible: Yes
- Architect: Karl Cornelius; Waldemar Suadicani

Other information
- Station code: 5100
- DS100 code: BRD
- IBNR: 8089082
- Category: 5
- Fare zone: VBB: Berlin B/5656
- Website: www.bahnhof.de

History
- Opened: 15 May 1879

Services
Preceding station	Berlin S-Bahn	Following station
Friedrichshagen towards Spandau	S3	Wilhelmshagen towards Erkner
Location
- Location within Berlin

Rahnsdorf station is a station of the Berlin S-Bahn. It is located in the district of Rahnsdorf in the Berlin district of Treptow-Köpenick.

== History ==
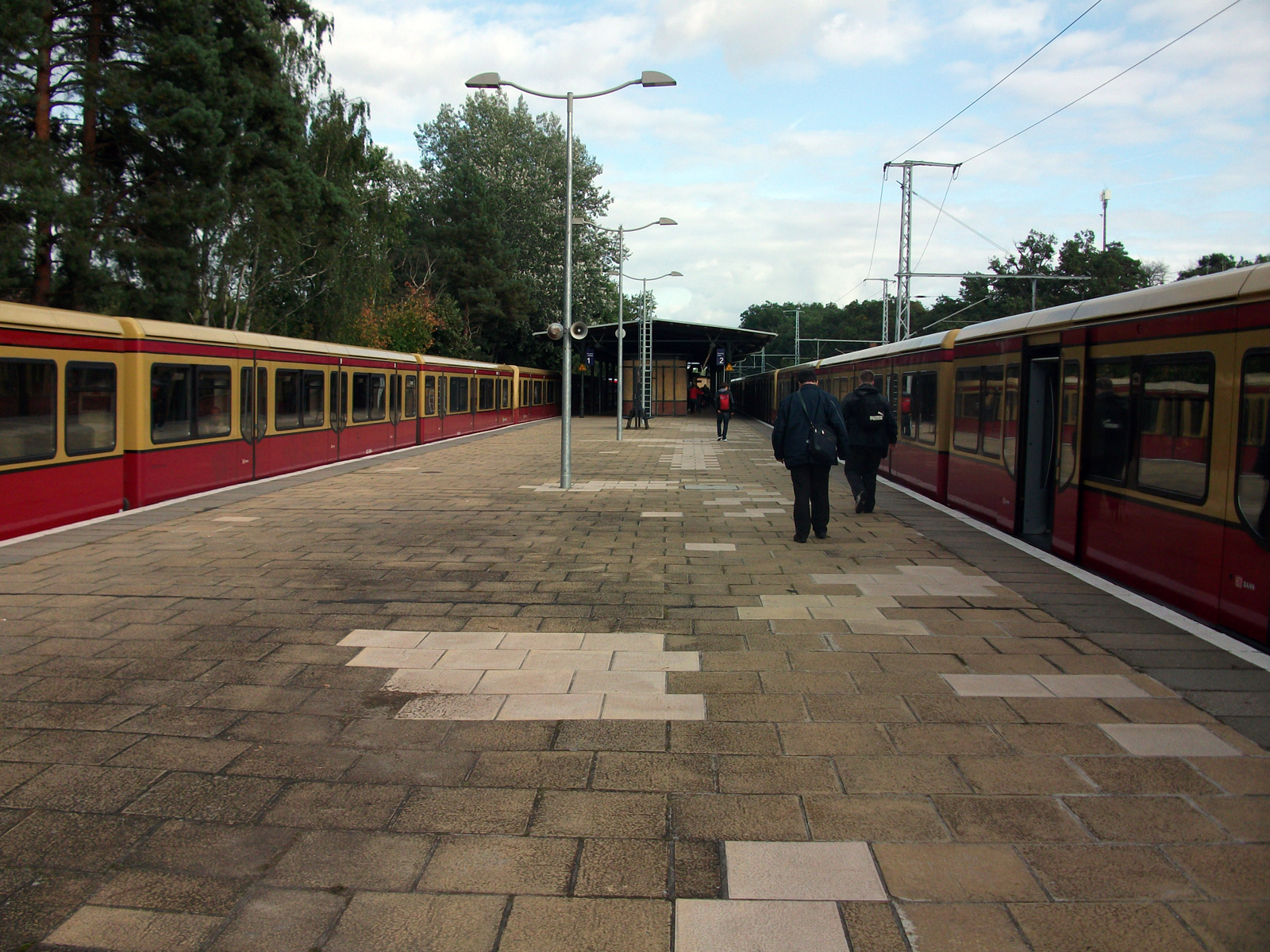
S-Bahn platforms

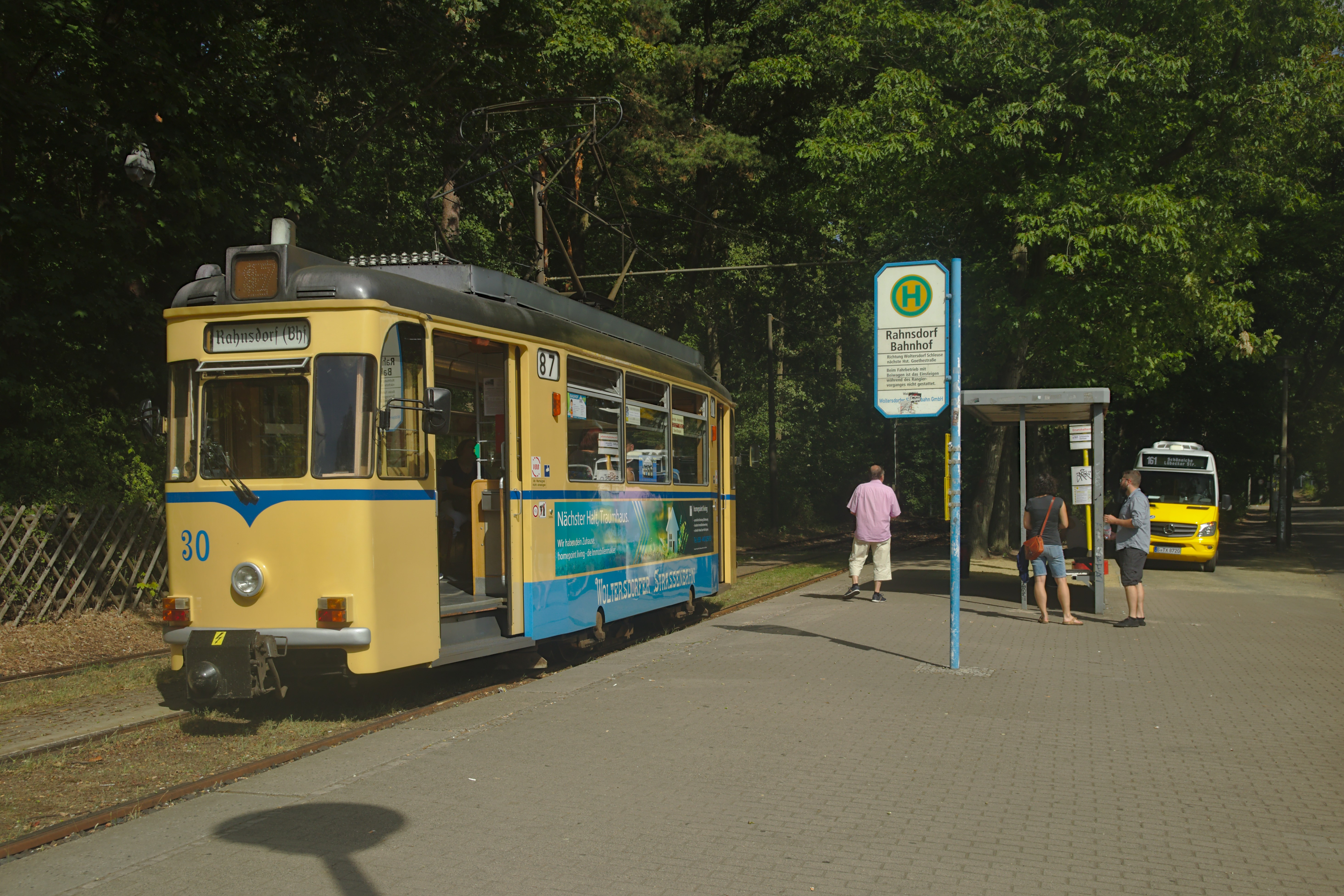
Terminus of the Woltersdorf tramway at Rahnsdorf station (August 2018)

The station was opened on 15 May 1879. The station was rebuilt to a design by the architects Charles Cornelius and Waldemar Suadicani between 1899 and 1902. This work was made necessary by the elevation of the tracks and the simultaneous construction of a separate pair of tracks for long-distance and freight traffic. The original construction of the station area is still largely preserved and the station building is heritage-listed.

There was a serious railway accident on 11 November 1916: a group of track maintenance workers made up of women—because of labour shortages as a result of the First World War—waved to the soldiers of a passing military train. Because of poor visibility due to fog, they did not hear a warning—that was given too late—of a train approaching on the track on which they stood. 19 women were killed. The look-out person was convicted and sent to prison for one year.

Electric suburban trains have stopped at the station since 11 June 1928; since 1 December 1930 they have been branded as S-Bahn services. Some steam-hauled services continued for about half a year and they ended in 1929.

Train services ended in April 1945 due to the war. After the Second World War, the Soviet occupation administration dismantled both S-Bahn tracks. The line, including the station, was returned to operation on 1 September 1948. The station was the terminus until 2 November 1948, since the line had not been restored to Erkner.

In 2009 and 2010, the platform canopy was restored, the lighting was renewed and tactile paving was installed.

== Impact on the surrounding area ==
The station is away from major settlements, but it has influenced the development of the surrounding villages. In particular Schoeneiche has extended, with the area of Fichtenau developing towards the station to produce a "nose".

== Passenger services ==
The station is served by Berlin S-Bahn line S3 between Erkner and Ostkreuz. In addition, the station is served by bus route 161, which is operated by the Berliner Verkehrsbetriebe, and is the starting point of the Woltersdorf tramway (tramline 87 of the Verkehrsverbund Berlin-Brandenburg).

Service	Route
S3	Ostkreuz – Rummelsburg – Betriebsbahnhof Rummelsburg – Karlshorst – Wuhlheide – Köpenick – Hirschgarten – Friedrichshagen – Rahnsdorf – Wilhelmshagen – Erkner
