= Berlin Wuhlheide station =

Railway station in Berlin, Germany

Wuhlheide
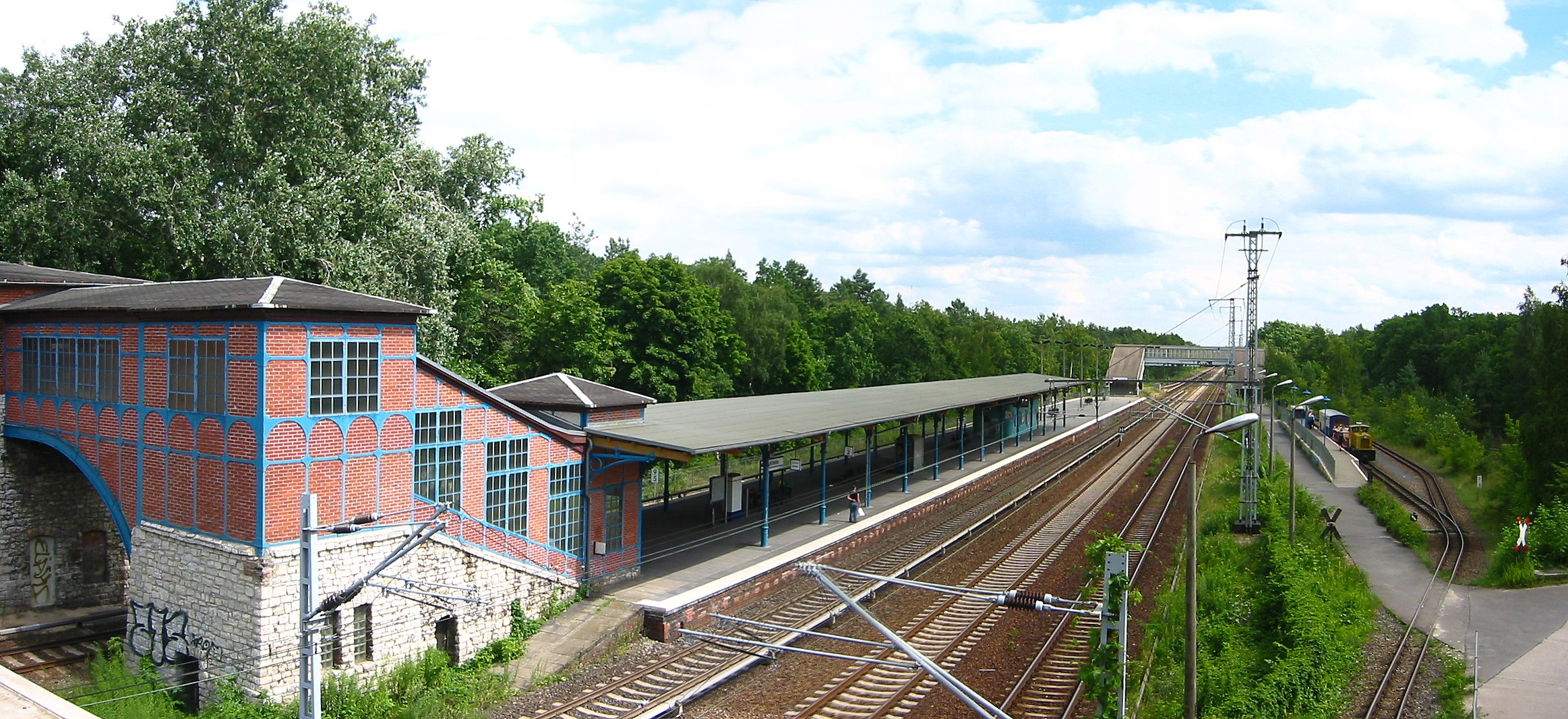
- Left: station building and platform, right: the park train platform

General information
- Location: Am Bahnhof, Wuhlheide, Berlin; Germany
- Coordinates: 52°28′8″N 13°33′12″E
- Lines: Berlin–Guben (KBS 200.3); Berlin outer ring (platform dismantled); Park Railway (KBS 12299)
- Platforms: 2
- Train operators: S-Bahn Berlin

Construction
- Accessible: Yes

Other information
- Station code: 6899
- DS100 code: BWHH
- IBNR: 8089097
- Category: 5
- Fare zone: VBB: Berlin B/5656
- Website: www.bahnhof.de

History
- Opened: 1877
- Former names: Sadowa

Services
Preceding station	Berlin S-Bahn	Following station
Karlshorst towards Spandau	S3	Köpenick towards Erkner
Location
- Location within Berlin

Wuhlheide station is a station of the Berlin S-Bahn on the Berlin-Frankfurt (Oder) railway (“Lower Silesian–Markish Railway”). It is located at the junction of the line with the Berlin outer ring in the district of Köpenick. In addition to the platform for line S3 of the S-Bahn, it also includes the terminus of the Berlin Park Railway (Berliner Parkeisenbahn) to the south of the S-Bahn line, which connects to a recreational area. The station is not to be confused with the now abandoned Wuhlheide marshalling yard on the outer ring.

== History ==
In the winter of 1877/1878, the station was opened at a crossing point with several forest roads and tracks. South of it, at the confluence of the Wuhle with the Spree, there was a tourist restaurant called "Sadowa"–after Sadová, the decisive battle of the Austro-Prussian War–which gave the station its name. A pair of tracks was added to the line for suburban trains in 1902. Following the upgrade, the station was also extended and it was given typical Berlin platform canopies and a glazed, “greenhouse” entranceway (Gewächshausgang). In 1929, the station was renamed Wuhlheide, after a forest area of the same name, which extends around the station.

The Outer Freight Ring (Güteraußenring, GAR), which crossed the main line on a bridge structure, was built immediately west of the S-Bahn station in 1940. After the war, the S-Bahn tracks were dismantled, but one track was rebuilt two years later. From July 1948 diesel railcars were used to operate suburban services running from Kaulsdorf over the so-called VnK Railway and the Berlin outer ring to Grunau. A station was established at the crossing with the Berlin-Frankfurt (Oder) line for transfers, but no direct route was built between the two platforms. Since the service passed through an almost uninhabited area, the service was discontinued after just one year. The platform on the outer ring was later demolished. In 1951, the Outer freight ring was replaced by the Berlin outer ring, which takes a similar, in places identical, route in this area.

The facilities were expanded again in 1993, this time south of the railway embankment. The Berlin Park Railway originally ran only on a circuit through the then Pioneer Park (Pionierpark), as the Pioniereisenbahn (the children's railway of the Young Pioneers), but it was extended to the S-Bahn station and received a double-track railway terminus. In July 2011, a lift was put into operation at the western end of the platform, giving the station barrier-free access.

== Passenger services ==
The station is served by Berlin S-Bahn line S3 between Erkner and Ostkreuz. Services operate at 10-minute intervals between Ostkreuz and Friedrichshagen.

Service	Route
S3	Ostkreuz – Rummelsburg – Betriebsbahnhof Rummelsburg – Karlshorst – Wuhlheide – Köpenick – Hirschgarten – Friedrichshagen – Rahnsdorf – Wilhelmshagen – Erkner

In addition to the adjacent platform of the Berlin park railway, it is possible to change to bus route 190 of operated by Berliner Verkehrsbetriebe stop at the station.
