= Berlin Wilhelmshagen station =

Railway station in Berlin, Germany

Wilhelmshagen
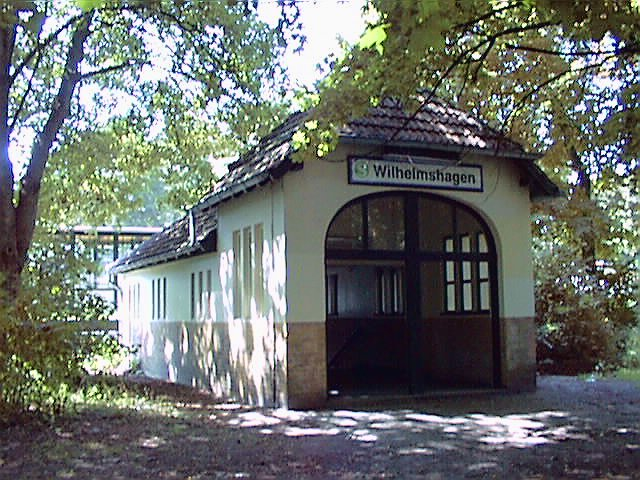

General information
- Location: Wilhelmshagen, Rahnsdorf, Berlin; Germany
- Coordinates: 52°26′19″N 13°43′20″E
- Line: Berlin–Guben (KBS 200.3)
- Platforms: 2
- Connections: S3

Construction
- Accessible: no
- Architect: Karl Cornelius; Waldemar Suadicani

Other information
- Station code: 6771
- DS100 code: BWIG
- IBNR: 8089094
- Category: 5
- Fare zone: VBB: Berlin B/5656
- Website: www.bahnhof.de

History
- Opened: 15 November 1882
- Former names: Neu-Rahnsdorf (1882–1902)

Services
Preceding station	Berlin S-Bahn	Following station
Rahnsdorf towards Spandau	S3	Erkner Terminus
Location

Berlin Wilhelmshagen station is located on the Berlin-Frankfurt (Oder) railway and the Berlin S-Bahn. It is located in the settlement of Wilhelmshagen in the suburb of Rahnsdorf in the district of Treptow-Köpenick and is the last stop in the suburbs of Berlin of the line to Erkner. It is served by the S-Bahn line S3.

== History ==
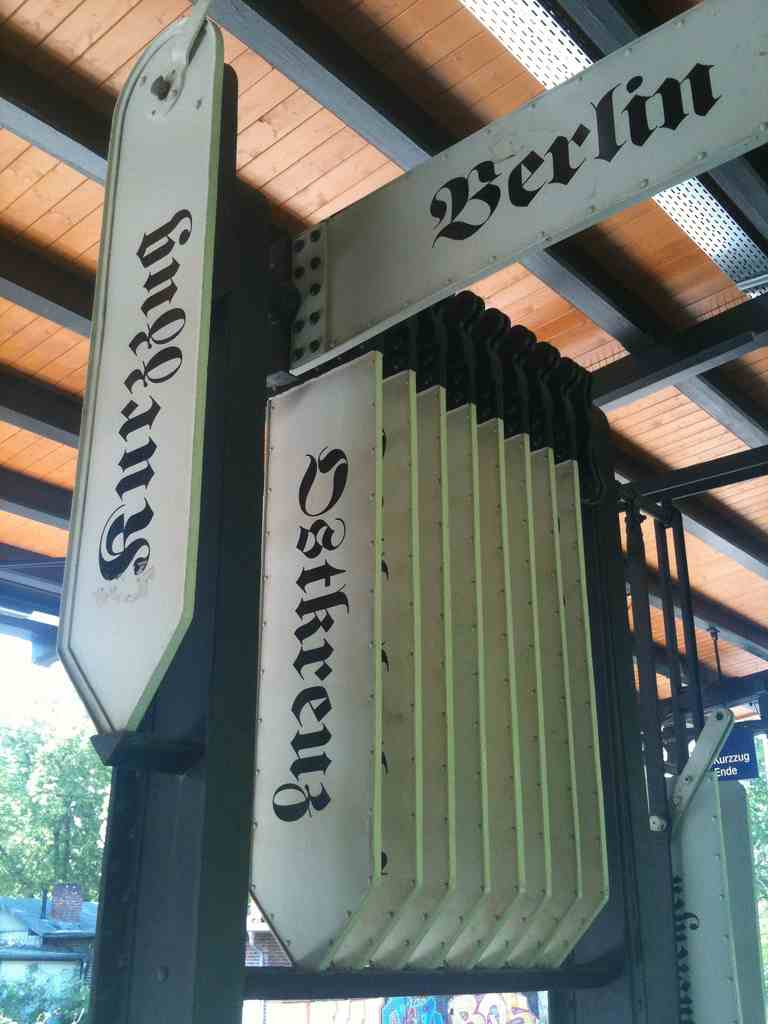
Destination indicators on the platform at Wilhelmshagen

The station was opened on 15 November 1882 as Neu-Rahnsdorf. With the rebuilding of a line (then part of the line between Berlin and Breslau—now Wrocław in Poland) with a new pair of long-distance tracks as far as Erkner, the new line was built on an embankment. The passenger station, which was now only served by suburban trains, was rebuilt in the course of this work to a design by the architects Charles Cornelius and Waldemar Suadicani. An island platform was built in the Berlin style. After the completion of the work in 1902, it was renamed Wilhelmshagen. The station building is heritage-listed.

The station underpass, which had been built at the request and expense of the inhabitants of Wilhelmshagen and the municipality of Woltersdorf, was opened in 1908.

Electric trains of the Berlin S-Bahn have stopped at the station since 11 June 1928 and the operation of steam-hauled trains ended in 1929. After the Second World War, the Soviet occupation administration dismantled both S-Bahn tracks. With released capacity and the dismantling of tracks elsewhere—including on the Prussian Eastern Railway—it was able to restore a single track in 1948. The electric S-Bahn service was resumed on 2 November 1948. The second track was reconstructed from 1957.

In January 2010, work began on the renewal of the platform canopy and the lighting system and the installation of tactile paving. The modernisation work was to have been completed by September 2010, but it was not completed until the end of the 2011.

== Passenger services ==
The station is served by line S3, operating during the day at 10 or 20 minute intervals between Erkner and Ostkreuz. In addition, the station is connected to other suburbs in the area by bus route 161, which is operated by the Berliner Verkehrsbetriebe.

Service	Route
S3	Ostkreuz – Rummelsburg – Betriebsbahnhof Rummelsburg – Karlshorst – Wuhlheide – Köpenick – Hirschgarten – Friedrichshagen – Rahnsdorf – Wilhelmshagen – Erkner
