= Berlin Hirschgarten railway station =

Railway station in Berlin, Germany

Hirschgarten
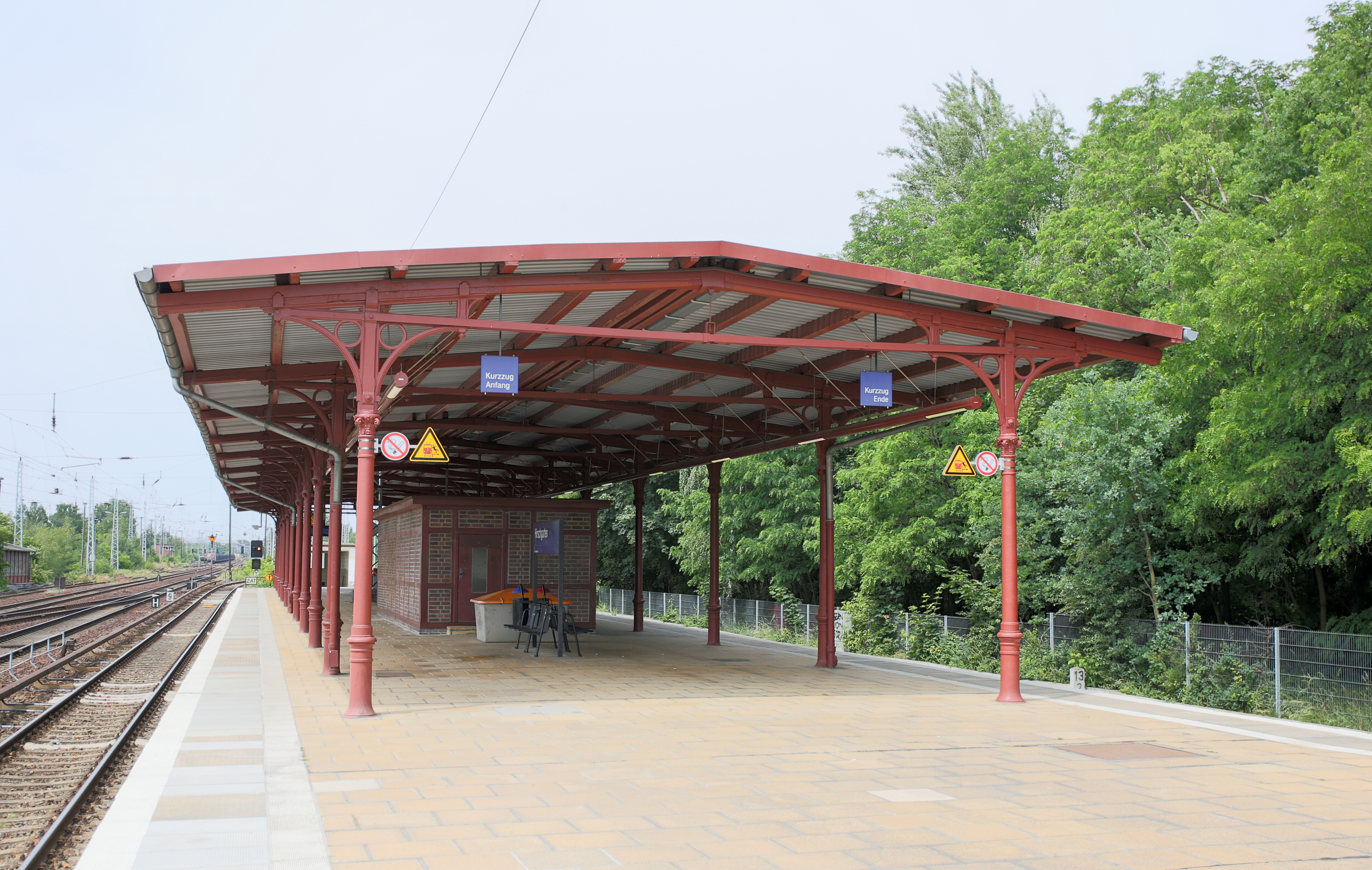

General information
- Location: Berlin Hirschgarten, Berlin; Germany
- Coordinates: 52°27′28″N 13°36′12″E
- Line: Berlin–Guben (13.1)
- Platforms: 2
- Connections: S3

Construction
- Accessible: no

Other information
- Station code: 2790
- DS100 code: BHI
- Category: 5
- Fare zone: VBB: Berlin B/5656
- Website: www.bahnhof.de

Services
Preceding station	Berlin S-Bahn	Following station
Köpenick towards Spandau	S3	Friedrichshagen towards Erkner
Location

Berlin-Hirschgarten station is a station of the Berlin S-Bahn in district of Hirschgarten in the Berlin district of Treptow-Köpenick. It is located north of Hirschgarten on the Berlin-Frankfurt (Oder) railway.

The station is served by Berlin S-Bahn line S3 between Erkner and Ostkreuz. Services operate at 10-minute intervals between Ostkreuz and Friedrichshagen.

Service	Route
S3	Ostkreuz – Rummelsburg – Betriebsbahnhof Rummelsburg – Karlshorst – Wuhlheide – Köpenick – Hirschgarten – Friedrichshagen – Rahnsdorf – Wilhelmshagen – Erkner
