= Berlin-Rummelsburg Betriebsbahnhof station =

Railway station in Berlin, Germany

Berlin-Rummelsburg Berlin-Rummelsburg Betriebsbahnhof
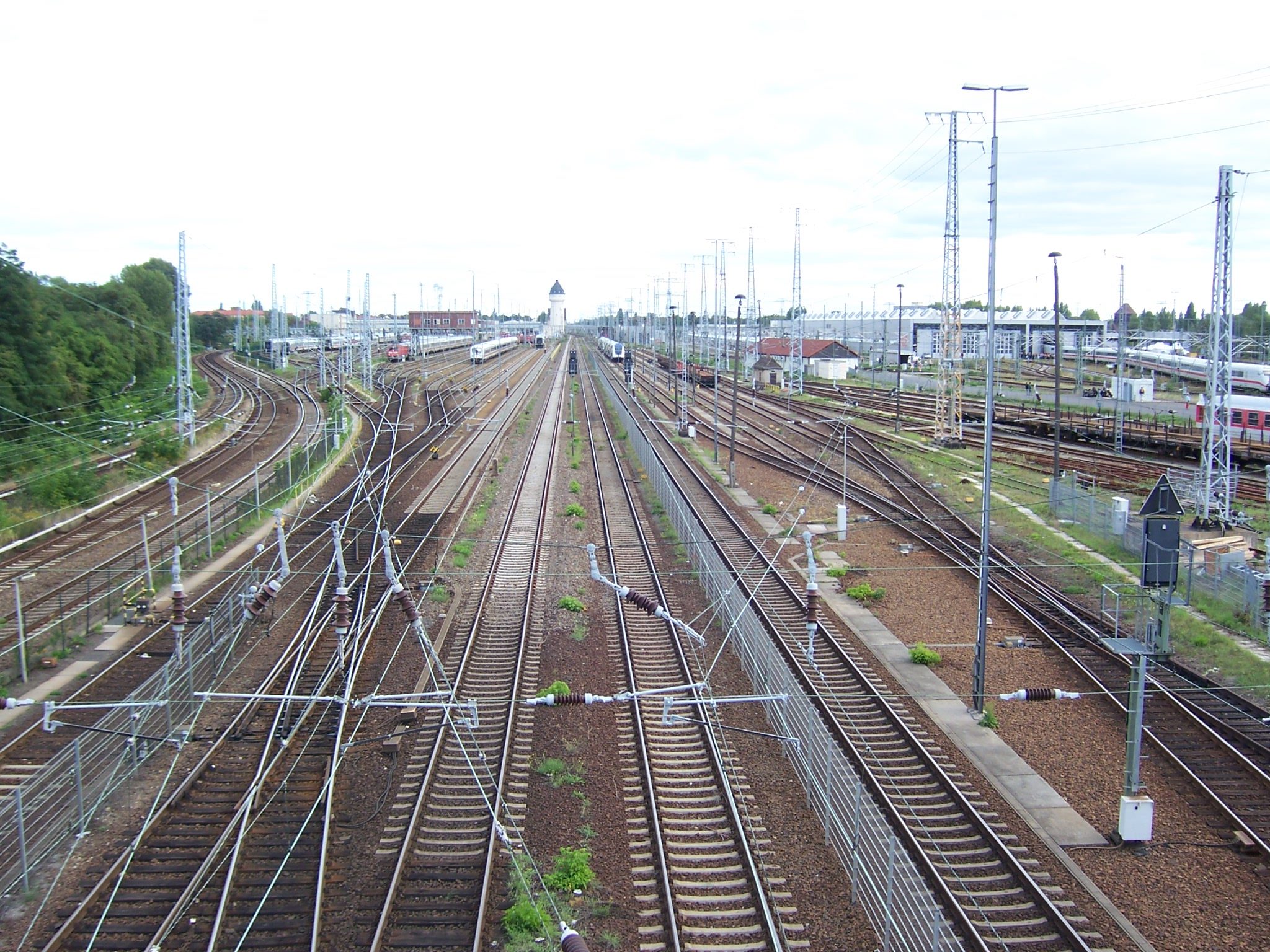
- Facilities of the service station Berlin-Rummelsburg

General information
- Location: Rummelsburg, Lichtenberg, Berlin; Germany
- Coordinates: 52°29′38″N 13°29′52″E
- System: Depot/S-Bahn station
- Lines: Berlin–Guben (KBS 200.3); Berlin Frankfurter Allee–Berlin-Rummelsburg; VnK Railway
- Platforms: 2 (S-Bahn)
- Train operators: S-Bahn Berlin
- Connections: S3

Construction
- Accessible: Yes

Other information
- Station code: 545
- DS100 code: BRGB (depot) BRB (S-Bahn)
- IBNR: 8089006
- Category: 4
- Fare zone: VBB: Berlin B/5656
- Website: www.bahnhof.de

History
- Opened: 1879 (marshalling yard); 5 January 1948 (opening of S-Bahn station)

Passengers
- 5,400

Services
Preceding station	Berlin S-Bahn	Following station
Rummelsburg towards Spandau	S3	Karlshorst towards Erkner
Location

Berlin-Rummelsburg Betriebsbahnhof is a halt of Berlin S-Bahn. It is named after the adjacent former freight yard Berlin-Rummelsburg, currently used as a Betriebsbahnhof (“service station”), in the suburb of Rummelsburg in the Lichtenberg district of Berlin. It is not to be confused with the more westerly Berlin-Rummelsburg S-Bahn station.

The station Berlin-Rummelsburg is primarily used as a depot for the storage and maintenance of passenger train sets used for long-distance traffic. In particular, InterCity Express trains terminating in Berlin are stored there. The halt Berlin-Rummelsburg Betriebsbahnhof is served by S-Bahn line S3.

== Location ==
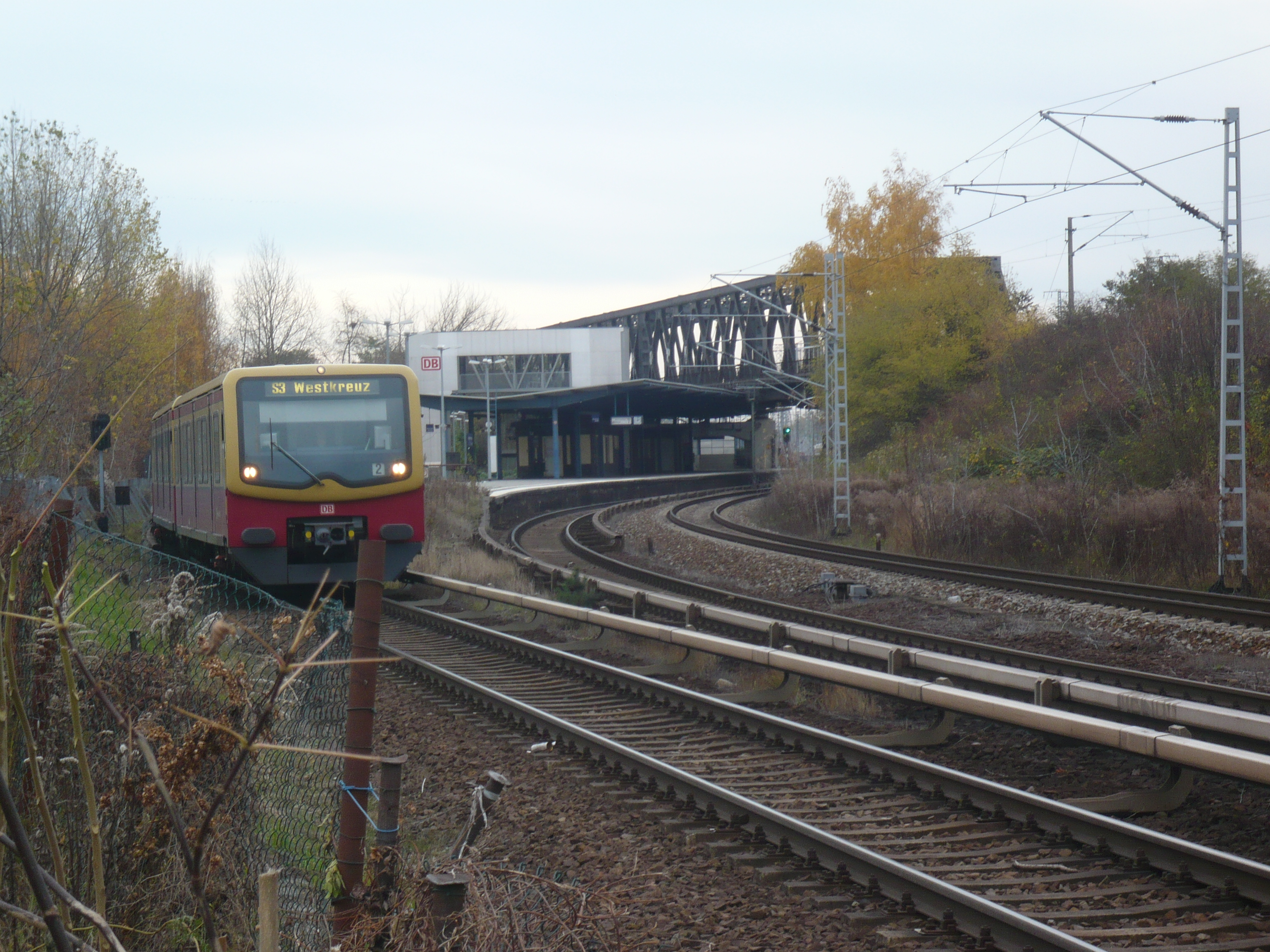
View of the S-Bahn-Station with its people mover (behind the S-Bahn train) and the overhead railway bridge of the VnK Railway in the background

The station is located on the Berlin-Frankfurt (Oder) railway (“Lower Silesian–Markish Railway”) between the S-Bahn Berlin-Rummelsburg station and Berlin-Karlshorst station. The northern pair of tracks is used by S-Bahn services, while the remaining tracks serve regional and mainline services and are not connected to the station. To the west of the station, the VnK Railway (which once connected to Kaulsdorf station) branches from the northeast and crosses the S-Bahn station over a long iron truss bridge. The Berlin Frankfurter Allee–Berlin-Rummelsburg railway connects to the Berlin Ringbahn in the area. In the southeast was the electrified Oberschöneweide Industrial Railway ("Bulls Railway") for freight traffic, which linked to the industrial area in Oberschoeneweide until the mid-1990s.

Betriebsbahnhof Rummelsburg S-Bahn station has a set of exit stairs to the southeast, which leads to an underpass under the tracks to Hönower Weg and to the operations station in the other direction. The latter is reserved for Deutsche Bahn employees. A Schmid peoplemover was established in June 2007 to provide barrier-free access instead of a conventional lift because of a lack of space.

== History ==
The freight yard was originally opened in 1867 to handle cattle. The construction of the existing yard commenced in 1875 when the Prussian state railways decided to build a marshalling yard to sort freight wagons using the new Ringbahn. It was opened on 1 September 1879 as the first railway yard of its kind in the Berlin area. For the first time sloping tracks were used for shunting. A connection was built as a two-track line running from the yard to the west to the Ringbahn.

In 1902, the Lower Silesian-Markish Railway was rebuilt with four tracks, with the northern pair reserved for suburban traffic. The marshalling yard was converted in 1914 to a depot for storing passenger carriages. There was also a station on the suburban tracks, which was initially reserved for workers at the carriage depot. Since 11 June 1928, the suburban trains have been operated electrically and since 1 December 1930, the services have been branded as the "S-Bahn".

The Welthauptstadt Germania plans of the Nazis envisaged a major expansion of the railway infrastructure in Rummelsburg to serve as a point for marshalling trains for a new Ostbahnhof (“East station”) to be built at Ostkreuz. However, the plans remained only on paper.

On 5 January 1948, the S-Bahn station was opened for general passenger traffic.

In the 1970s, the yard was used almost exclusively for storing passenger trains. From 1980, a storage and treatment plant was built for the transit trains that ran between West Berlin and the West Germany without stopping in East Germany, which were inaugurated on 15 December 1983. The infrastructure was co-financed by West Germany under an intra-German Transit Agreement that came into force after 1972.

The Rummelsburg Intercity Express (ICE) depot trains was opened in 1998 for the servicing of ICE trains that begin or end in Berlin to coincide with the renovation of the Berlin Stadtbahn. Together with the depot for express carriages, the site is just under two kilometres long and 400 meters wide. In 2002, the facility was extended with the addition of another five workshop tracks.

A renewal of facilities for the servicing of passenger rollingstock is planned. Thus, the central hall will be rebuilt, the engine shed and the large wagon shed will be extended and three new maintenance platforms will be built. The pedestrian bridge between the S-Bahn station and the depot is to be replaced by a new bridge. The hall for the exterior cleaning was extended in 2013, so a complete ICE 2 set can be de-iced there. It will be possible to treat six ICE trains in 24 hours.

== Passenger services ==
The station is served by the S-Bahn line S3.

Service	Route (before enlongment to Spandau)
S3	Ostkreuz–Rummelsburg–Betriebsbahnhof Rummelsburg–Karlshorst–Wuhlheide–Köpenick–Hirschgarten–Friedrichshagen–Rahnsdorf–Wilhelmshagen–Erkner
