= Friedrichshagen =

- Quarter of Berlin
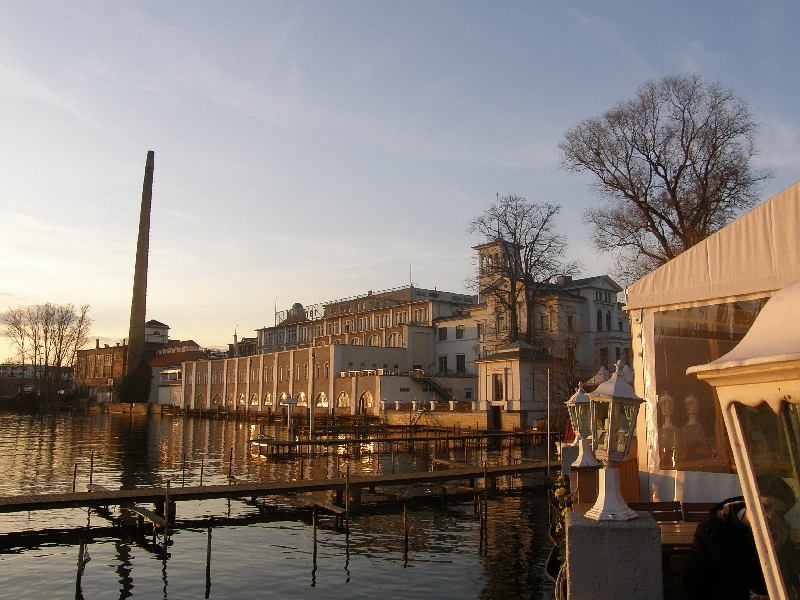
- "Berliner Bürgerbräu" building over the Müggelspree

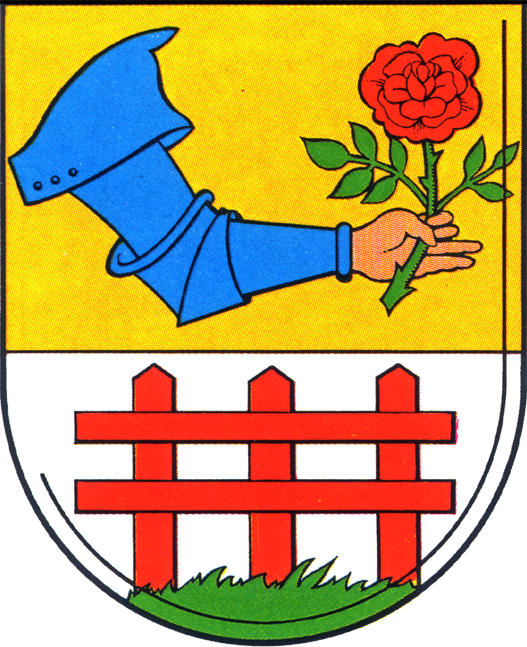
- Coat of arms

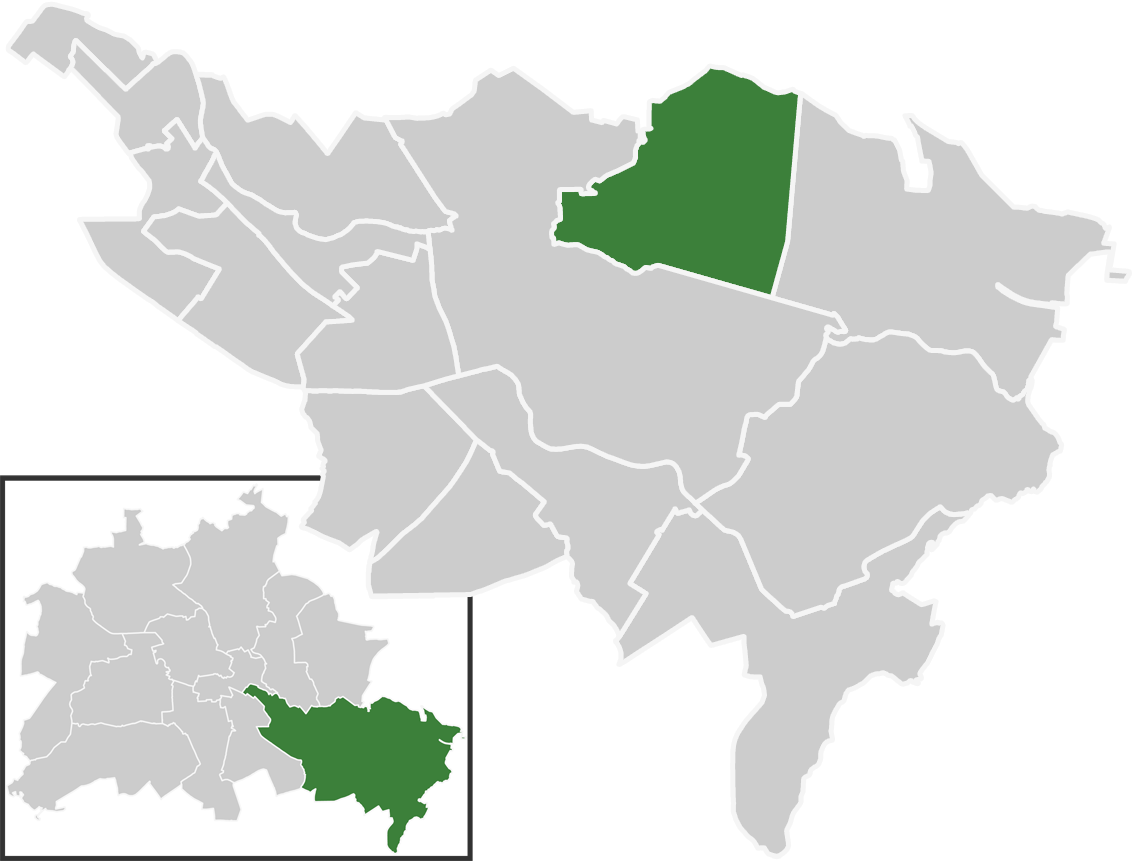
- Location of Friedrichshagen in Treptow-Köpenick and Berlin
- Interactive map of Friedrichshagen
- Location within Germany Location within Berlin
- Coordinates: 52°27′00″N 13°37′00″E
- Country: Germany
- State: Berlin
- City: Berlin
- Borough: Treptow-Köpenick
- Founded: 1753
- Subdivisions: 1 zone

Area
  - Total: 14 km^{2} (5.4 sq mi)
- Elevation: 34 m (112 ft)

Population (2024-12-31)
  - Total: 19,036
  - Density: 1,400/km^{2} (3,500/sq mi)
- Time zone: UTC+01:00 (CET)
  - Summer (DST): UTC+02:00 (CEST)
- Postal codes: 12587
- Vehicle registration: B
- Website: Official website

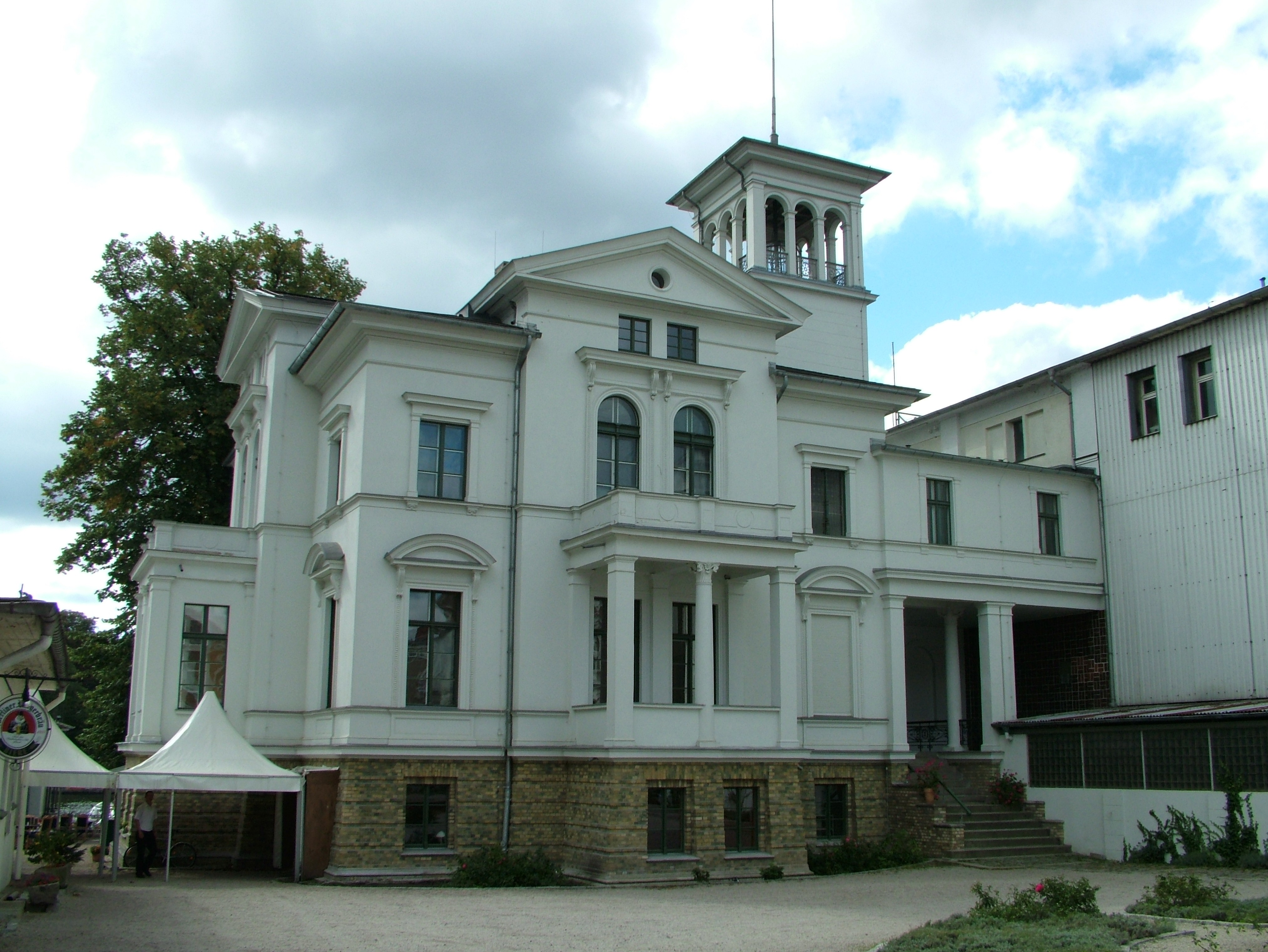
The Weiße Villa (White Villa)

Friedrichshagen (German pronunciation: [fʁiːdʁɪçsˈhaːɡn̩]) is a German locality (Ortsteil) within the Berlin borough (Bezirk) of Treptow-Köpenick. Until 2001 it was part of the former borough of Köpenick.

== History ==
The colony of Friedrichsgnade was founded on May 29, 1753, by King Frederick II of Prussia. Autonomous Prussian municipality of the former Niederbarnim district of the Province of Brandenburg until 1920, it merged into Berlin with the "Greater Berlin Act." From 1949 to 1990, like the rest of the borough of Köpenick, it was part of East Berlin.

The ornithologist Jean Cabanis (1816–1906) died in Friedrichshagen.

== Geography ==
=== Overview ===
Located in the south-eastern suburb of Berlin, Friedrichshagen borders with the Brandenburger municipalities of Hoppegarten (in Märkisch-Oderland district), and Schöneiche (in Oder-Spree). It is also bounded by the Berliner localities of Köpenick and Rahnsdorf. The residential area is surrounded in north by a big portion of the Berliner Stadtforst (city forest), and in south by the river Müggelspree (tributary of the Spree), and by the western side of Müggelsee, the biggest lake in Berlin.

=== Subdivision ===
Friedrichshagen counts 1 zone (Ortslage):

- Hirschgarten

== Transport ==
As urban railways, the locality is served by S-Bahn line S3, at the stations of Friedrichshagen and Hirschgarten. It is also served by the tram lines 60 and 61. The line 88, not operated by BVG and partially separated from the citizen network, connects Friedrichshagen station to Schöneiche and Rüdersdorf.

== Photogallery ==
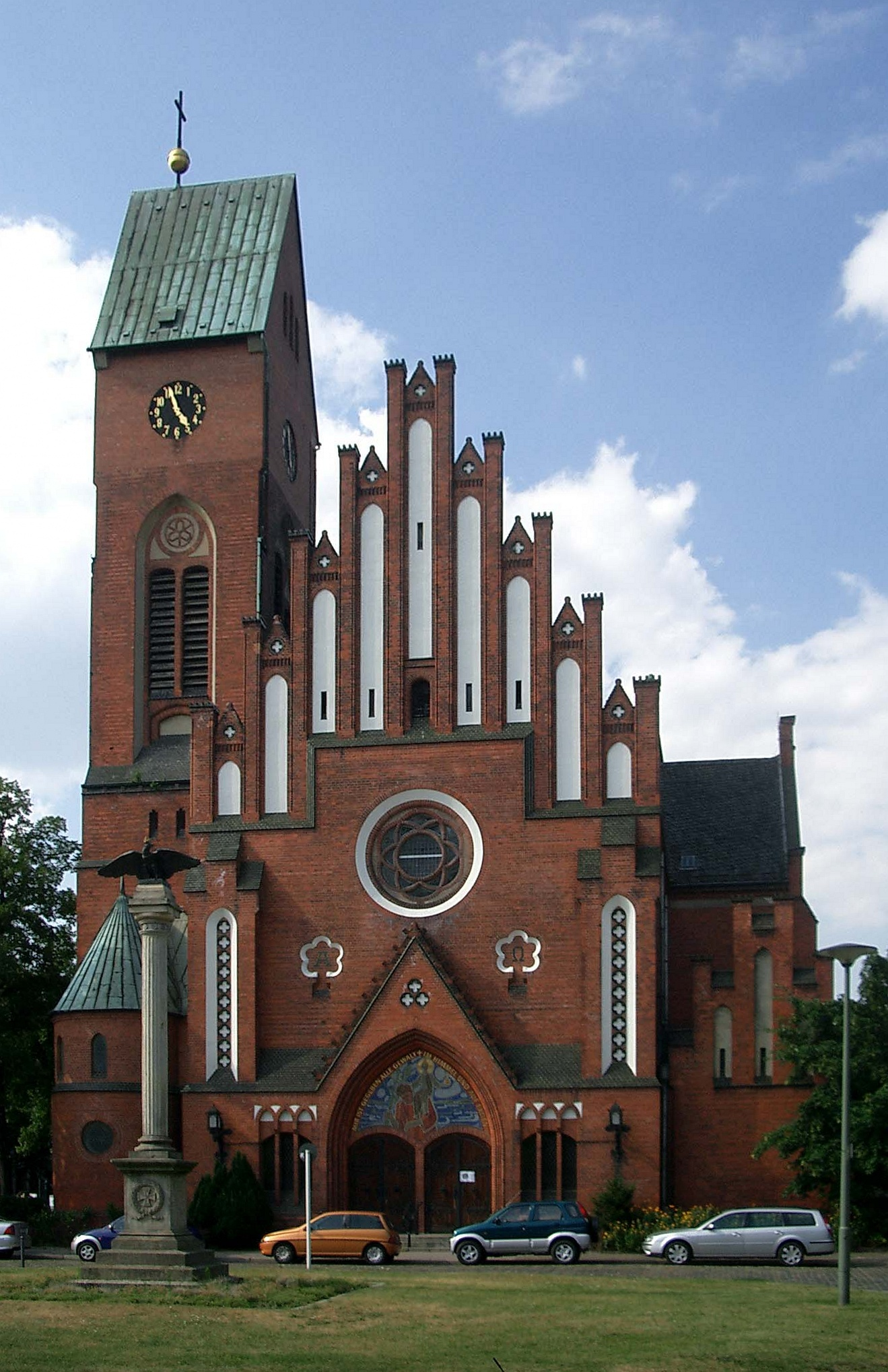
Saint Christopher's church

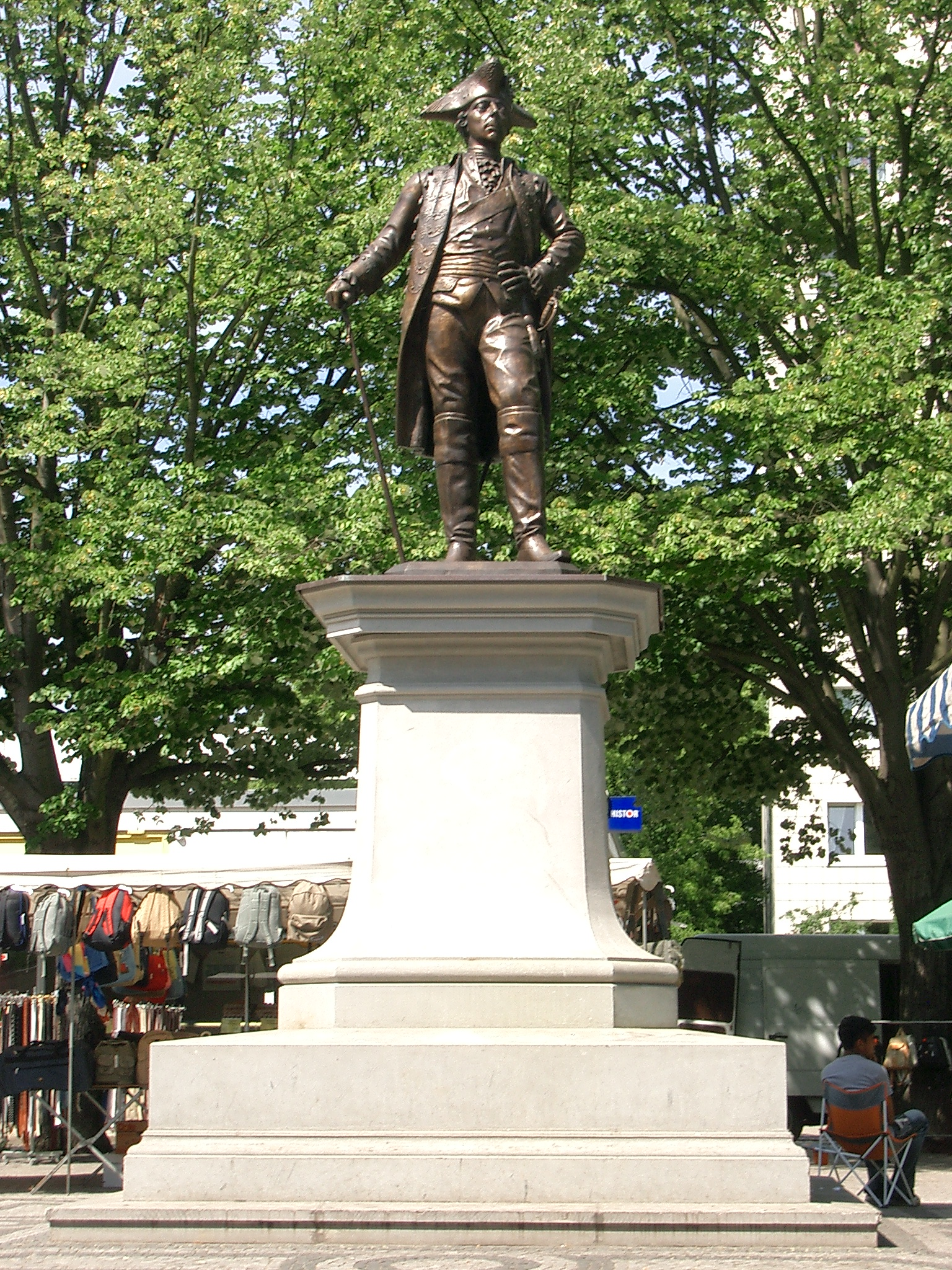
Monument to Friedrich II

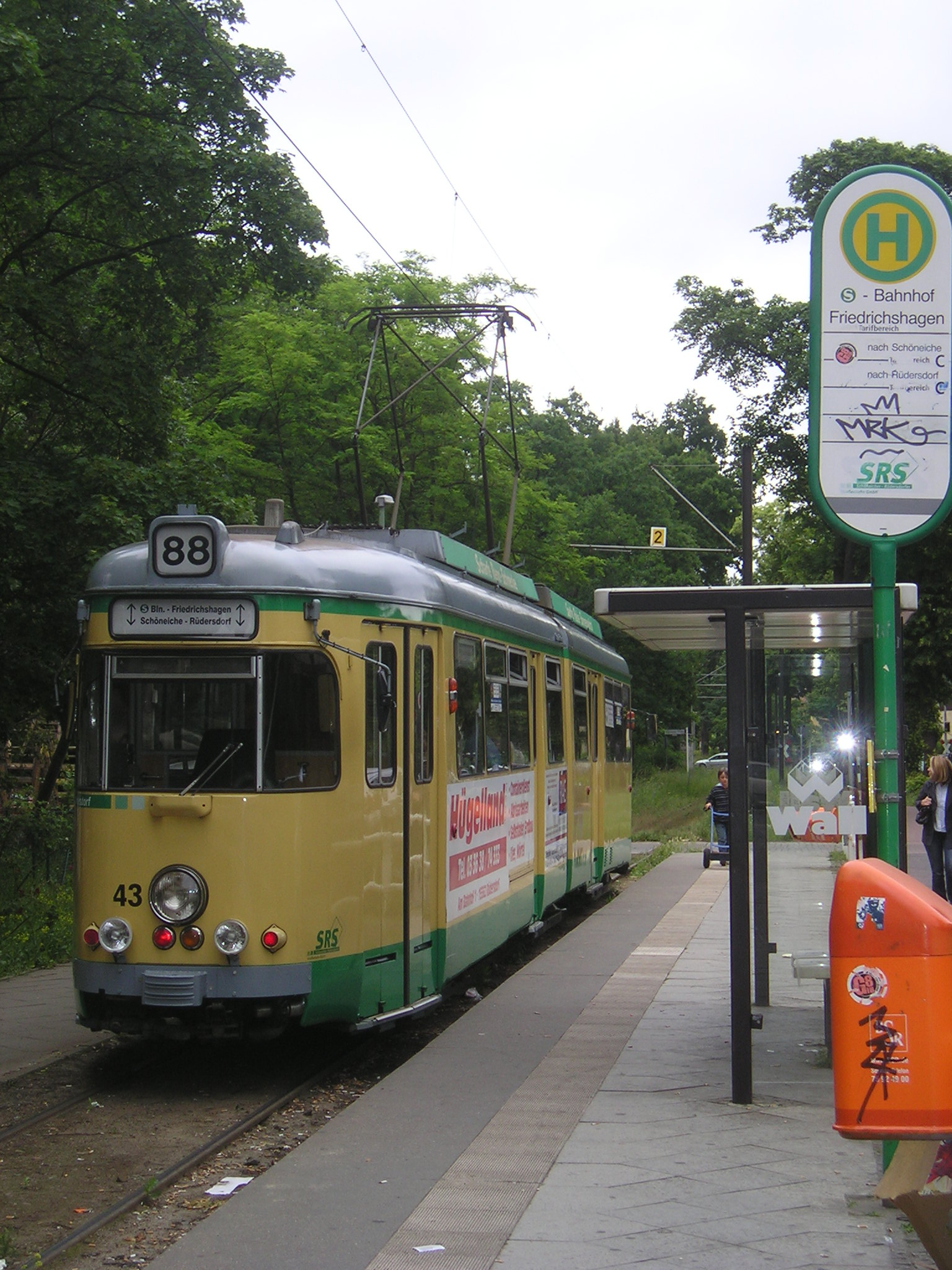
The tram 88 at Friedrichshagen station
