= Rahnsdorf =

- Quarter of Berlin
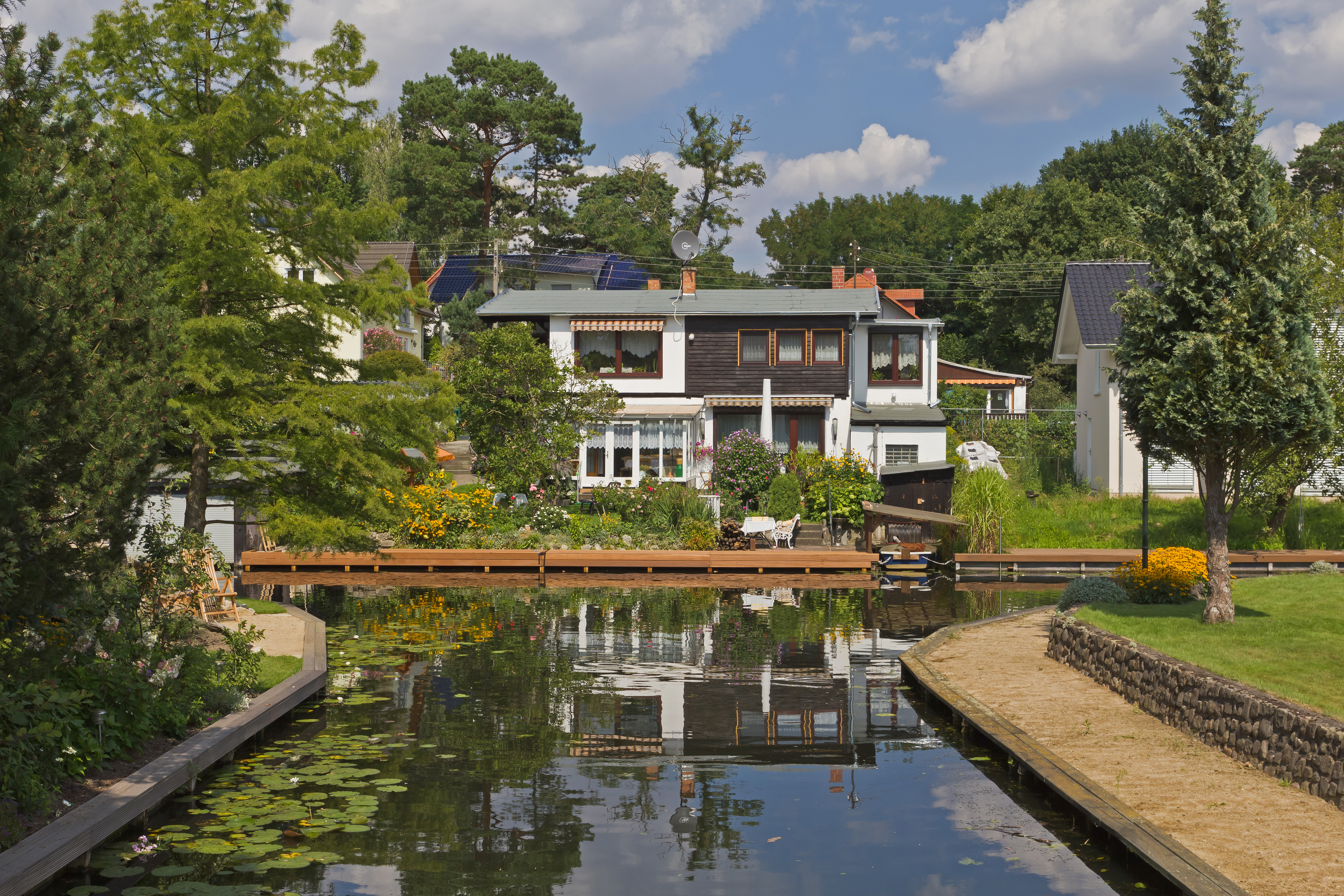
- The settlement of Neu-Venedig (New Venice)

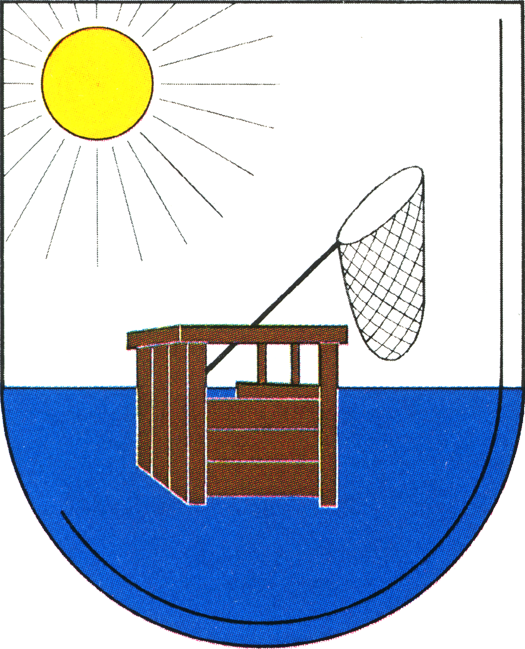
- Coat of arms

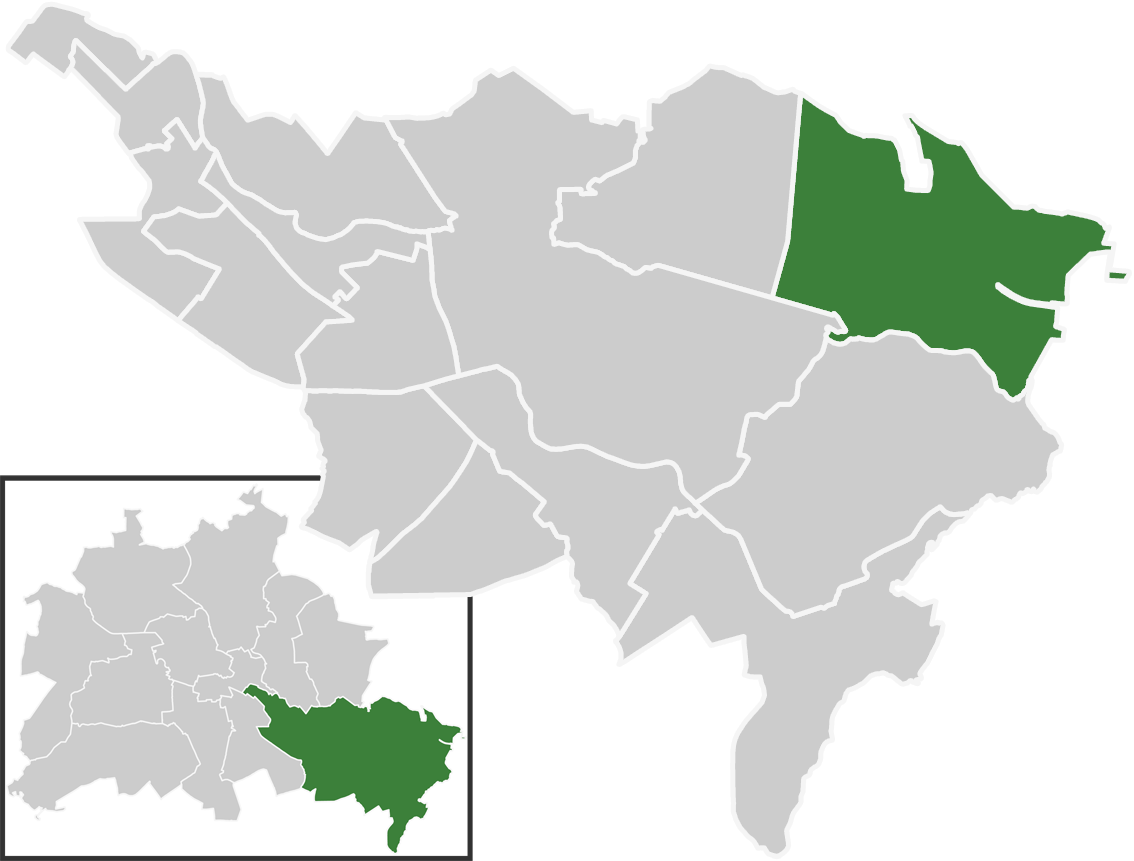
- Location of Rahnsdorf in Treptow-Köpenick and Berlin
- Interactive map of Rahnsdorf
- Location within Germany Location within Berlin
- Coordinates: 52°26′00″N 13°42′00″E
- Country: Germany
- State: Berlin
- City: Berlin
- Borough: Treptow-Köpenick
- Founded: 1375
- Subdivisions: 4 zones

Area
  - Total: 21.5 km^{2} (8.3 sq mi)
- Elevation: 34 m (112 ft)

Population (2024-12-31)
  - Total: 11,138
  - Density: 518/km^{2} (1,340/sq mi)
- Time zone: UTC+01:00 (CET)
  - Summer (DST): UTC+02:00 (CEST)
- Postal codes: 12589
- Vehicle registration: B

Rahnsdorf (German pronunciation: [ˈʁaːnsˌdɔʁf]) is a locality (Ortsteil) of Berlin, Germany, located in the southeast of the Berlin borough (Bezirk) of Treptow-Köpenick. Until 2001 it was part of the former borough of Köpenick.

== History ==
Rahnsdorf was first mentioned in 1375, having been founded as a fishermen's village with its own church. The latter burned down almost completely in 1872 and thus had to be rebuilt thereafter. In 1902, the Villenkolonie of Wilhelmshagen was built in the east of the village with Tabor Church. In 1920, Rahnsdorf was merged into the city of Berlin as a consequence of the "Greater Berlin Act" and from 1949 to 1990 it was part of East Berlin.

== Geography ==
=== Overview ===
Located in the south-eastern suburb of Berlin, Rahnsdorf is the easternmost locality of the city. The easternmost point is represented by Springeberg, a ground located in front of Flakensee lake, bordering with Woltersdorf and Erkner, two municipalities of the Oder-Spree district, Brandenburg. Similar to an exclave it is linked to Berliner mainland with a road (Woltersdorfer Landstraße) forming a strip, as in Steinstücken. The other municipality bordering with Rahnsdorf is Schöneiche, also part of Oder-Spree. Another peculiarity of Rahnsdorfer borders with Brandenburg is represented by Landjägerallee, a road parallel to the railway that forms a thin and long strip belonging to Erkner surrounded by Berliner territory. The localities of Treptow-Köpenick bordering with Rahnsdorf are Friedrichshagen, Köpenick and Müggelheim.

Surrounded by a big portion of the Berliner Stadtforst (city forest), Rahnsdorf counts two lakes in its territory: the eastern portion of Müggelsee (Berlin's largest lake by surface area), and the western one of Dämeritzsee. Between the Müggelspree river, an affluent of the Spree representing the border shared with Müggelheim, and the old town, it is located Neu-Venedig (New Venice), a residential settlement so named because it is crossed by numerous artificial canals.

=== Subdivisions ===
Rahnsdorf counts five zones (Ortslagen):

- Rahnsdorf (Rahnsdorfer Muehle)
- Alt-Rahnsdorf
- Hessenwinkel
- Neu-Venedig
- Wilhelmshagen

== Transport ==
As urban railways, the locality is served by S-Bahn line S3, at the stations of Rahnsdorf and Wilhelmshagen. It is also served by the tramway lines 61 and 87. The second, not operated by BVG and separated from the citizen network, connects Rahnsdorf station to Woltersdorf. Another separated line (88) crosses a little portion of the locality without stops. Rahnsdorf counts also two ferry lines, F23 and F24, running over Müggelspree, at Müggelwerderweg and Kruggasse.

== Personalities ==
- Karl Hillert (1927–2004), sculptor, painter, graphic designer

== Photogallery ==
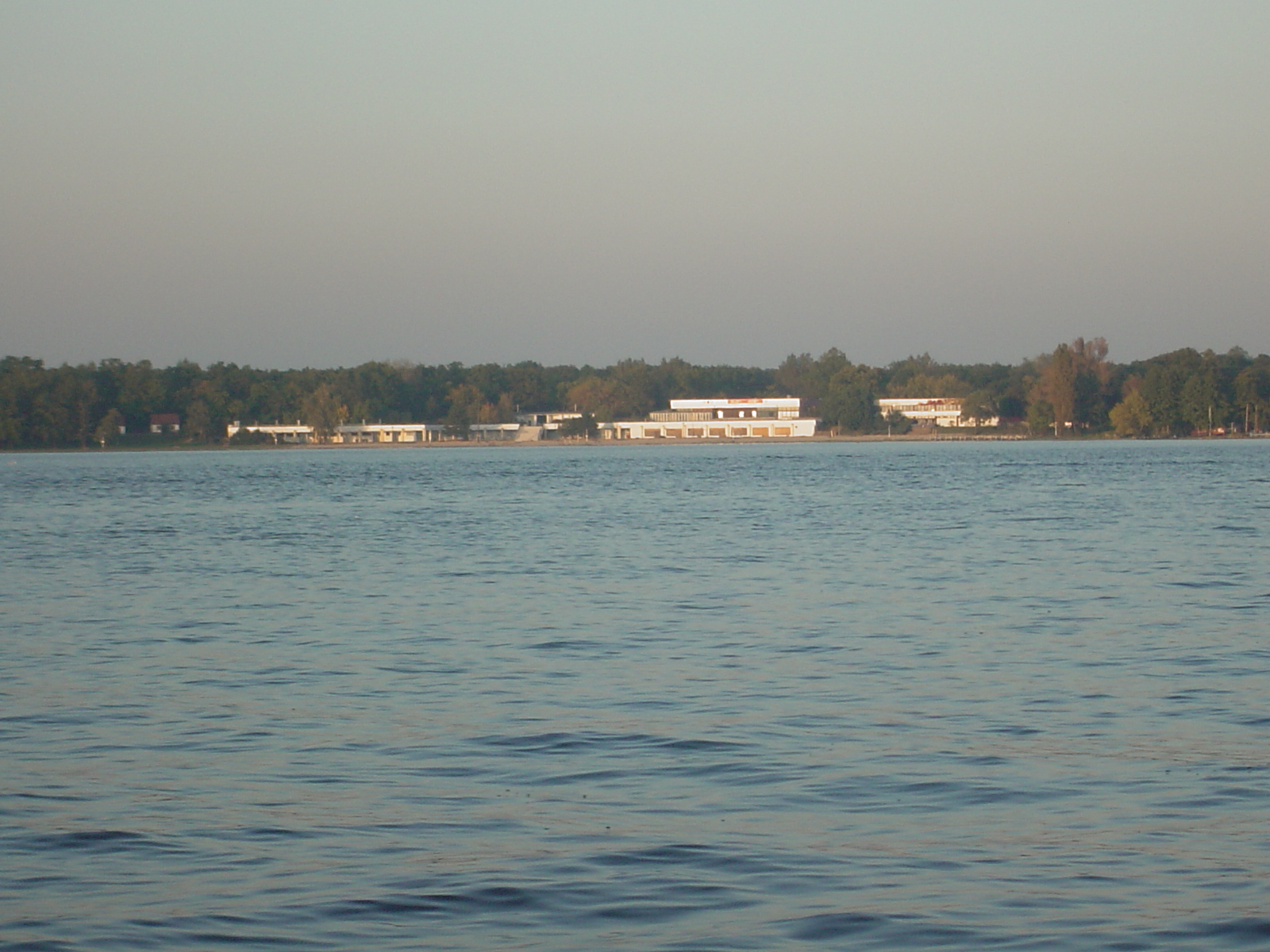
The Strandbad Rahnsdorf on Müggelsee

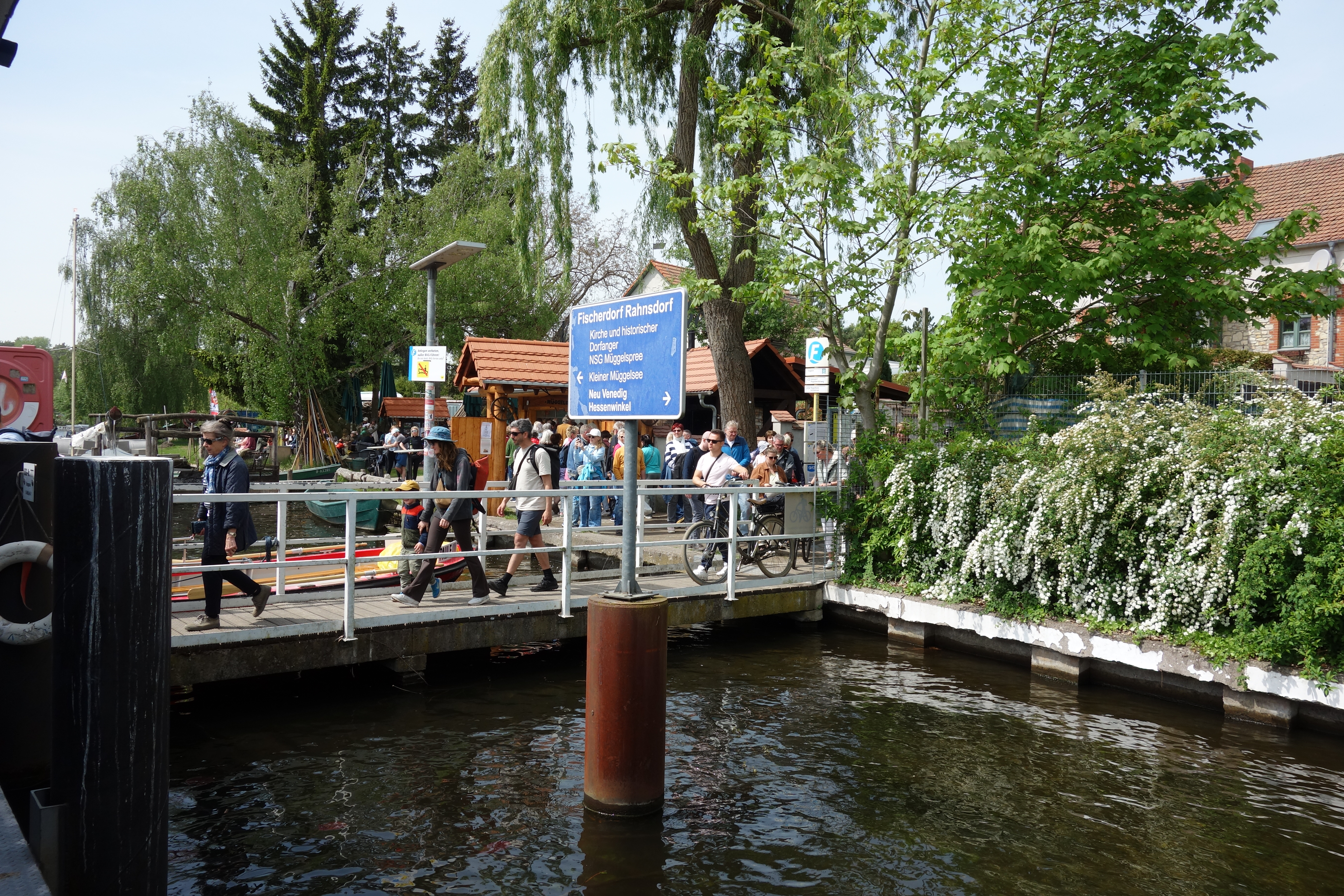
Landing Stage on Müggelsee

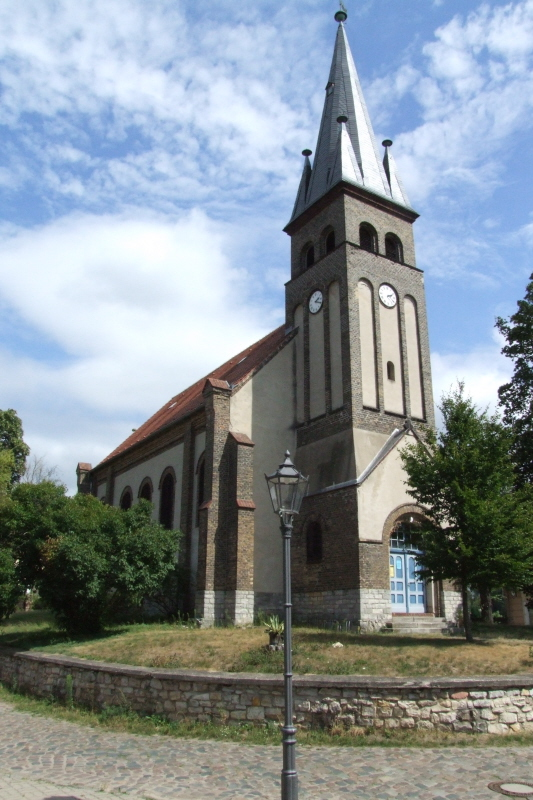
Village church

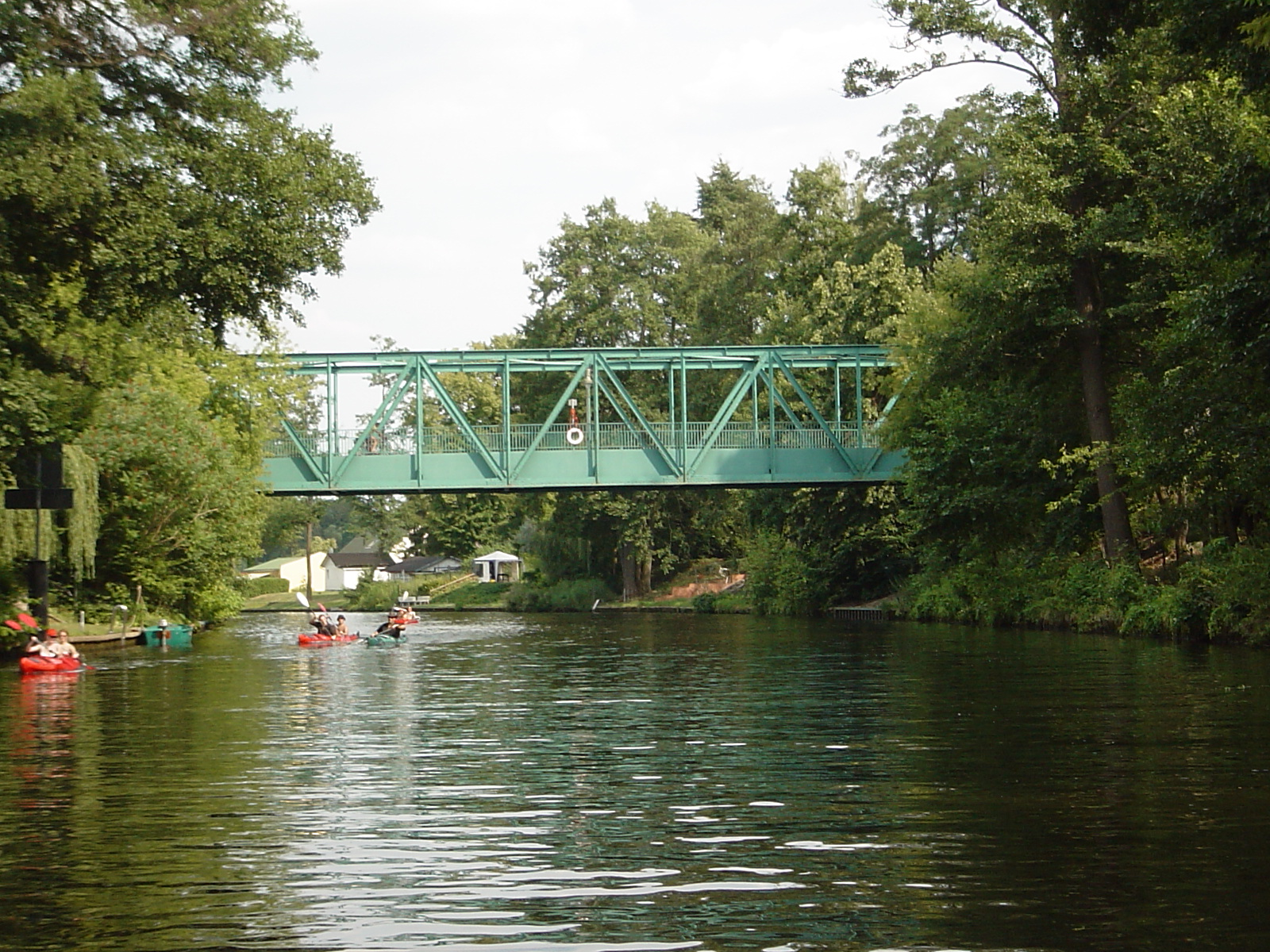
The Triglawbrücke bridge at Hessenwinkel

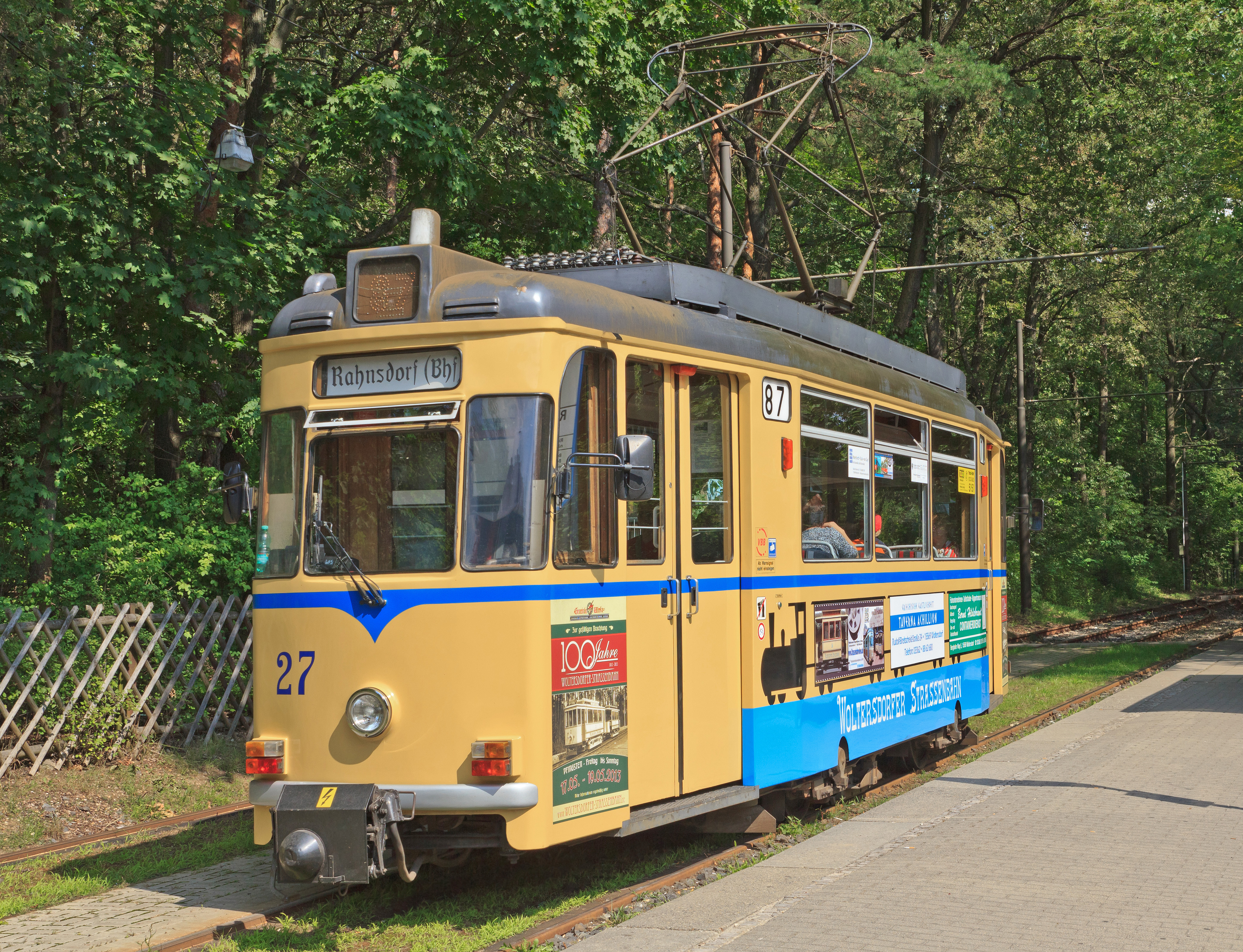
The Woltersdorfer Tram (Line 87) at Rahnsdorf (2013)
