= Berlin-Karlshorst station =

Railway station in Berlin, Germany

Berlin Karlshorst
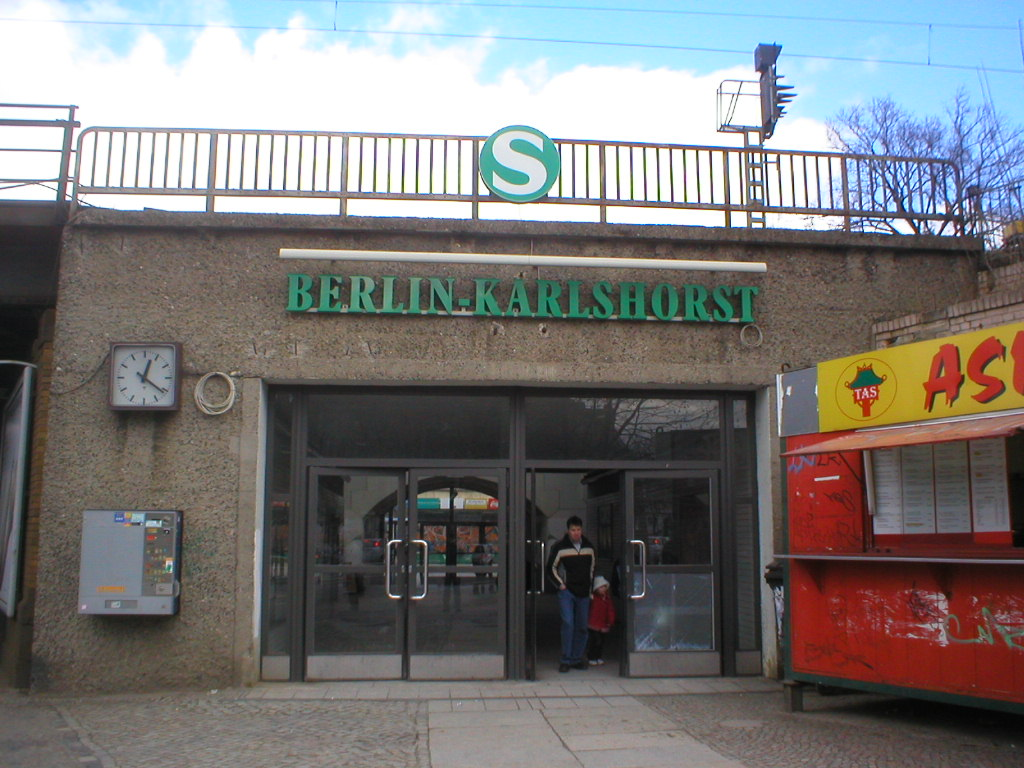
- Southern entrance to the station, 2005

General information
- Location: Treskowallee, Karlshorst, Lichtenberg, Berlin; Germany
- Coordinates: 52°28′51″N 13°31′33″E
- Line: Berlin–Guben (KBS 200.3, 207, 209.14)
- Platforms: 2
- Train operators: S-Bahn Berlin
- Connections: S3

Construction
- Accessible: Yes
- Architect: Karl Cornelius, Waldemar Suadicani

Other information
- Station code: 545
- DS100 code: BKH (long distance); BKLH (S-Bahn)
- IBNR: 8010035
- Category: 3
- Fare zone: VBB: Berlin B/5656
- Website: www.bahnhof.de

History
- Opened: 1 May 1895
- Closed: 10 December 2017 (long-distance platform)

Passengers
- 12,000 (S-Bahn); 1,800 (long distance)

Services
Preceding station	Berlin S-Bahn	Following station
Rummelsburg Betriebsbahnhof towards Spandau	S3	Wuhlheide towards Erkner
Location
- Location within Berlin

Berlin-Karlshorst station is a station served by regional and S-Bahn services in the suburb of Karlshorst in the Berlin district of Lichtenberg.

== History ==
The station was opened on May 1, 1895 on the Berlin-Frankfurt (Oder) railway (“Lower Silesian–Markish Railway”) under the name of Carlshorst, initially less for suburban services than for visitors to the harness racing track built in 1893/1894. A terminal station with six tracks was built to serve this traffic next to the suburb platform, with a private pavilion for the Emperor. In 1901, the station's name was changed to Karlshorst. The current station building and the bridge over the street now called Treskowallee was built with the raising of the tracks, which was completed in 1902. Electric S-Bahn operations on the line between Erkner and Potsdam commenced in 1928. Traffic at the station, which was still largely made up of visitors to the race track, was greatest in those years.

After the Second World War, the railway tracks were briefly converted to Russian broad gauge in July 1945. The Soviet dictator, Stalin took part in the Potsdam Conference and insisted on a trip without changing trains. The line was converted back to standard gauge in September of the same year. Since the line was the most important link to the USSR, neither long-distance track was dismantled for war reparations (unlike on other lines), but instead both of S-Bahn tracks were dismantled. The suburban tracks were re-laid up to 1947 so that S-Bahn trains could run to Karlshorst again.

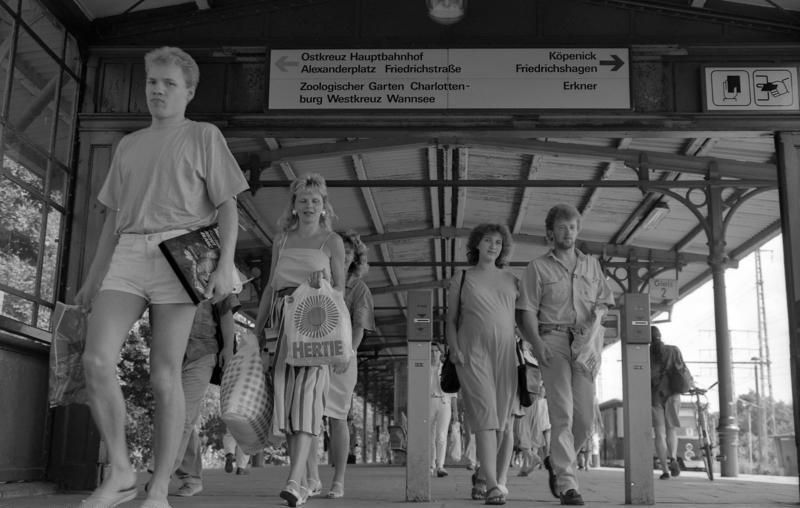
Berlin-Karlshorst, S-Bahn steps, 1991

After the construction of the Berlin Wall on August 13, 1961, the current regional platforms were built at the station. Since the S-Bahn trains could not run to Potsdam through West Berlin, new commuter trains were introduced between East Berlin and Potsdam via the Berlin outer ring. Karlshorst was selected to be the terminus for these Sputnik trains to run to and from Potsdam. In addition, some trains to Frankfurt (Oder) stopped at the station during GDR times. At certain times, Karlshorst was also the terminus of some express trains, if the capacity of other Berlin railway stations was insufficient.

The regional station has always remained provisional. This is especially evident in the connection from the platform for trains from the east, which is difficult to reach via a pedestrian bridge at the rear end of the S-Bahn platform. In 2007, the Deutsche Bahn replaced the viaduct for the long-distance tracks over the Treskowallee by a temporary bridge because of its state of disrepair. Between May 2010 and May 2011, the eastern access passenger subway was extended north to Stolzenfelsstraße and a small entrance court was built there, giving the station better access to the S–Bahn platform. The cost of €850,000 was met by the state of Berlin.

== Development ==
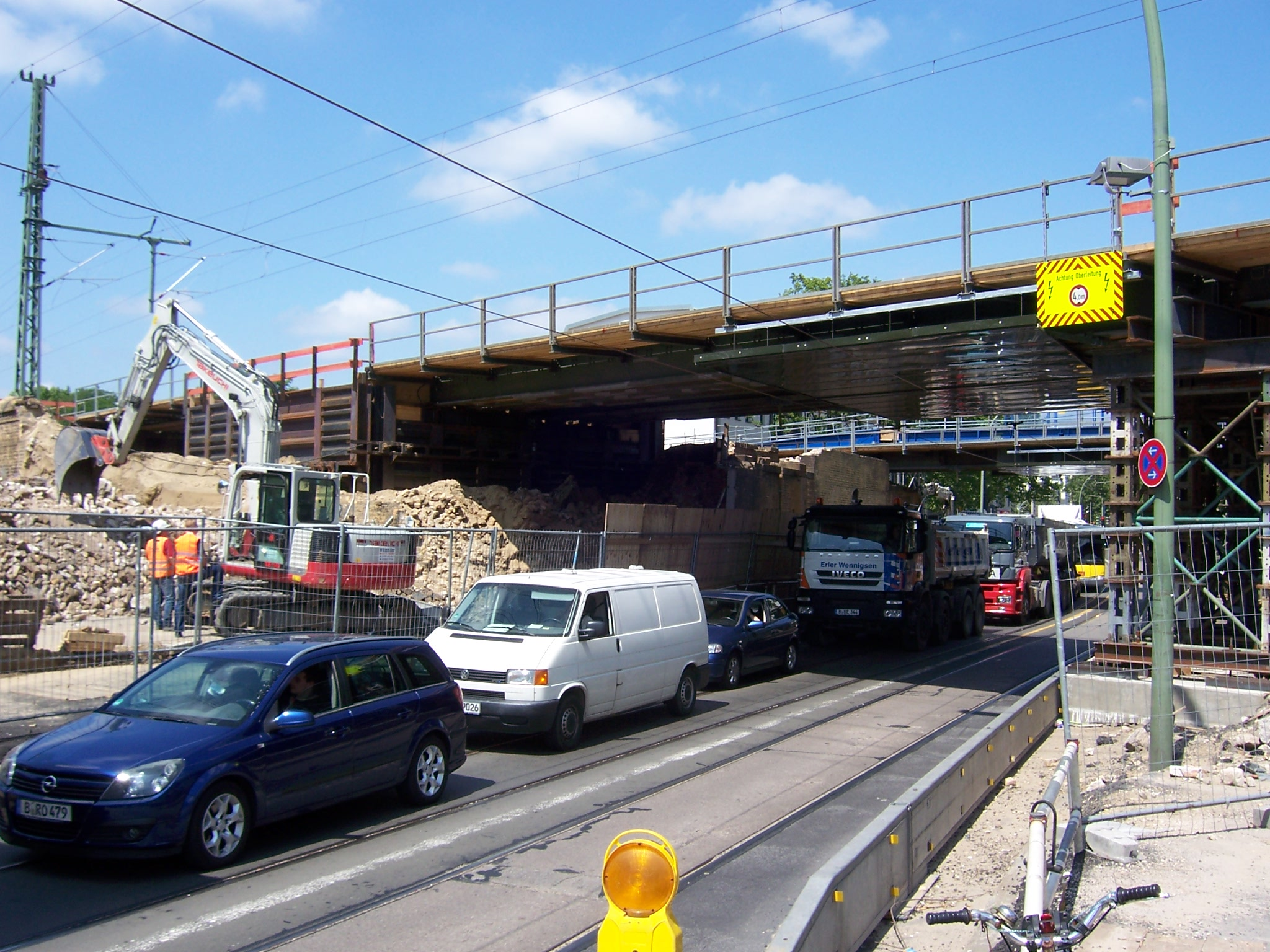
Demolition work at the railroad overpass of Treskowallee, 2012

During the implementation of the Berlin–Frankfurt (Oder) upgraded railway (Ausbaustrecke, ABS) project, the mainline tracks in the area of Berlin-Karlshorst station and the railway overpass over Treskowallee were completely modernised. The bridge had to be rebuilt due to its age and extensive damage. The clearance width of 15.75 metres was increased to 31.50 metres. An additional pedestrian bridge was built, creating a path to the west side of the Treskowallee (with a lift and staircase) and the original direct access from Treskowallee to the eastern abutment was reopened. The tram stops will be moved as part of the widening of Treskowallee under the bridge, with each new stop now sited next to the station. The corresponding planning approval was published on October 14, 2011.

After several postponements, construction began in early 2012, with an estimated construction period of two years and four months. In May 2012, the old bridge decks were dismantled over Treskowallee and replaced by temporary bridges so that the abutments could be rebuilt. Also preparations were made so that the S-Bahn could be operated over a single track from end of May. After the completion of new abutment, the first new steel superstructure with a weight of 240 tons to accommodate the two mainline tracks was then installed in June 2013. The installation of the superstructure for the two S-Bahn tracks and the new pedestrian overpass took place in early October 2013 and the operation of S-Bahn services on two-tracks was then restored. At this time the completion of the construction work was planned for April 2014.

The construction of the new pedestrian overpass was interrupted on October 12, 2013 when a seven-ton section of the bridge fell six metres to the surface of the concourse. Two construction workers were seriously injured and one was slightly injured. One of the seriously injured died after a few hours in the Berlin Emergency Hospital. The section of the bridge that crashed could not be raised and installed until February 2014. The planned time for the completion was significantly exceeded.

Upon completion of bridge works the district will, in coordination with the BVG and the Berlin water authority, reconstruct the street of Treskowallee and the new tram stops will be installed. Due to the need for a separate planning procedure, work will begin in 2017 and completion is scheduled for 2019.

== Train services ==
The station has not been served by trains from Potsdam via the southern Berlin outer ring since 1998. The operation of Regional-Express services to Frankfurt (Oder) ended a year later. Regional trains RE7 and RB14 connecting to central Berlin and Berlin-Schönefeld Airport station stopped at Karlshorst until December 2017. Today Karlshorst is served by from Erkner via the Berlin Stadtbahn to Spandau. The station is also served by several tram and city bus lines.

The station is served by the following service:

- Berlin S-Bahn services Spandau – Charlottenburg – Hauptbahnhof – Alexanderplatz – Ostkreuz – Karlshorst – Köpenick – Erkner
