= Erkner station =

Train station in Brandenburg, Germany

Erkner
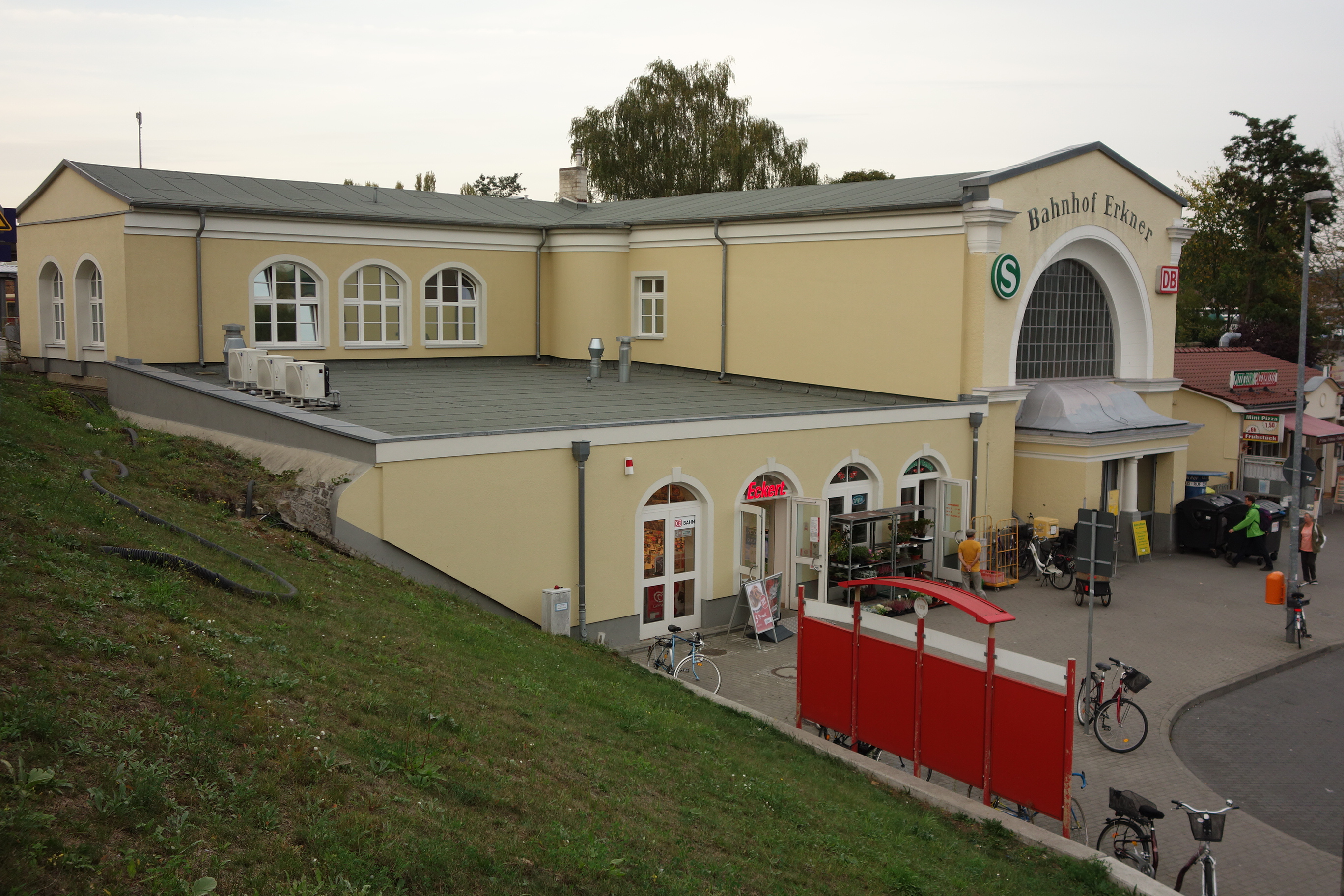
- Entrance building

General information
- Location: Bahnhofstr., Erkner, Brandenburg; Germany
- Coordinates: 52°25′38″N 13°45′09″E
- Line: Berlin–Guben (km 24.3)
- Platforms: 2 (long distance); 3 (S-Bahn)
- Connections: S3

Construction
- Accessible: Yes

Other information
- Station code: 1980
- DS100 code: BERK (long distance); BE (S-Bahn)
- IBNR: 8013477
- Category: 3
- Fare zone: : Berlin C/5761
- Website: www.bahnhof.de

History
- Opened: 23 October 1842; 183 years ago

Services
Preceding station	Ostdeutsche Eisenbahn	Following station
Berlin Ostkreuz towards Brandenburg Hbf or Magdeburg Hbf	RE 1	Fangschleuse towards Cottbus Hbf or Frankfurt (Oder)
Preceding station	Niederbarnimer Eisenbahn	Following station
Terminus	TES	Fangschleuse Tesla Süd Terminus
Preceding station	Berlin S-Bahn	Following station
Wilhelmshagen towards Spandau	S3	Terminus
Location

Erkner station is the passenger station in the town of Erkner situated east of Berlin in the German state of Brandenburg. It is located at kilometre 24.3 on the Berlin-Frankfurt railway. The station also includes a carriage shed for historic rollingstock of the Berlin S-Bahn.

== History ==
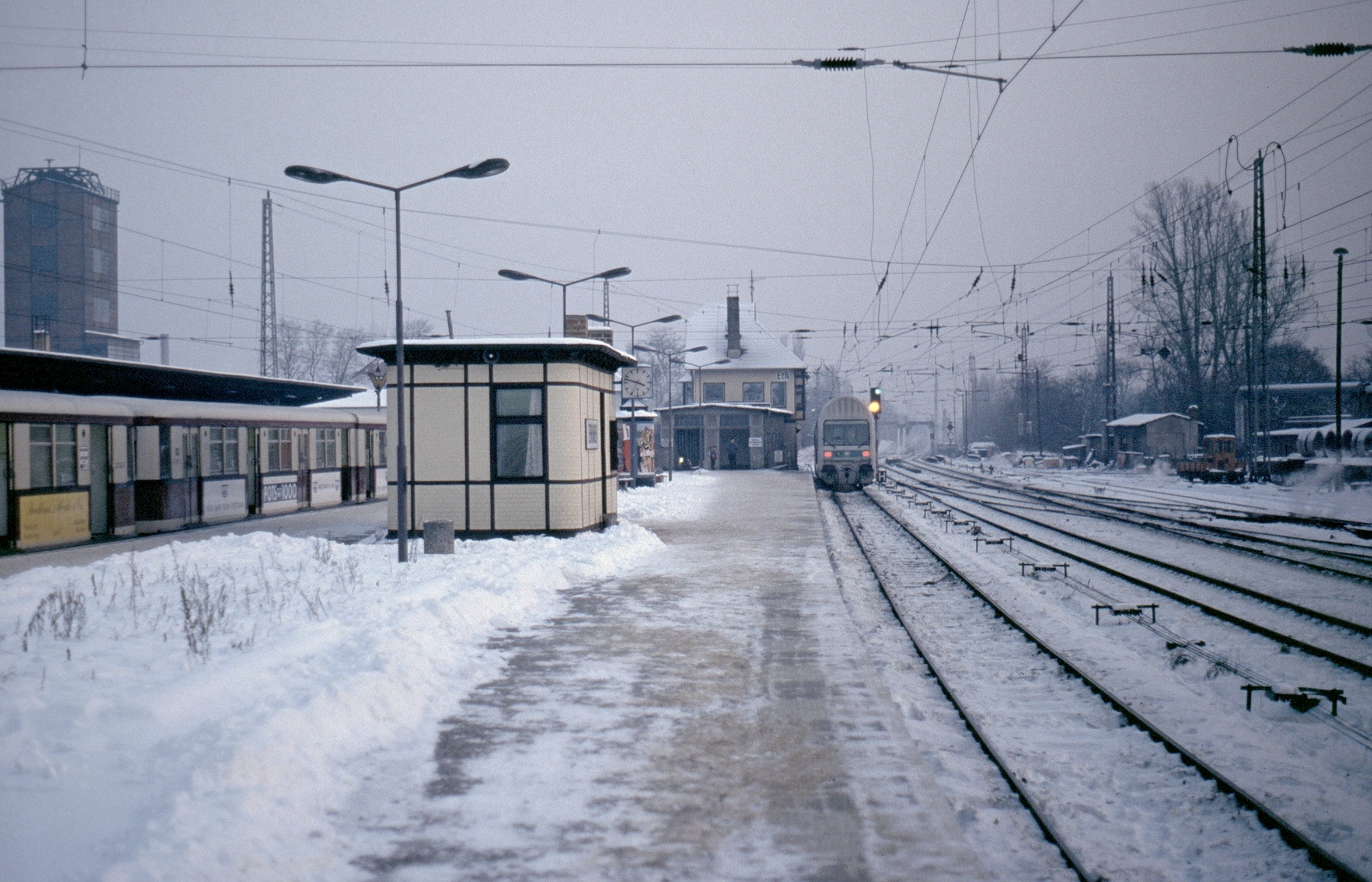
Erkner station in 1993.

The station was opened on 23 October 1842 as one of the first on the line from Berlin to Frankfurt (Oder). A railway settlement was built at the station on garden city principles in the 1920s. As part of the project to build an upgraded line (Ausbaustrecke) between Berlin and Frankfurt (Oder), the regional platforms were rebuilt as side platforms to the south between 2009 and 2011. In parallel, the station building was renovated and the S-Bahn platform was rebuilt from 2012. In the same year electronic interlocking went into operation on the long-distance tracks.

== Erkner carriage shed ==
The Erkner carriage shed (Triebwagenhalle Erkner, TWh Erk) was opened in 1928. It was administrated as part of the Berlin-Grunau workshop. With the introduction of new rollingstock of class 481/482, which was calculated to require less maintenance, the carriage shed was closed in 2000. It has been used since then by the Historische S-Bahn e. V association for rollingstock storage and staff facilities. The historic trains are located here and some minor maintenance work is carried out. In January 2010, the carriage shed was reopened due to the lack of capacity resulting from the cancellation of many services with the new rollingstock in 2009/2010. In December 2011, it became part of the Friedrichsfelde works for organisational purposes.

== Train services ==
The station is served twice per hour in both directions by RE 1 Regional-Express services towards Frankfurt (Oder) and Eisenhüttenstadt and towards Berlin, Brandenburg and Magdeburg. Since September 2023, almost 30 pairs of trains have been running Monday to Friday on behalf of Tesla, Inc. to transport the public to the Tesla Gigafactory Berlin-Brandenburg. In addition Erkner is the terminus of line S3 of the Berlin S-Bahn. The S-Bahn stops three times an hour in Erkner and six times an hour in the summer months. There is a large bus station next to the station, which is served by cross country buses from the area around Erkner.

The station is served by the following service(s):

- Regional services RE 1 Magdeburg – Brandenburg – Potsdam – Berlin – Erkner – Fürstenwalde – Frankfurt (Oder) (– Cottbus)
- TES Erkner – Fangschleuse Tesla Süd
- Berlin S-Bahn services Spandau - Westkreuz - Hauptbahnhof – Alexanderplatz – Ostbahnhof – Karlshorst – Köpenick – Erkner
