= Spandau Suburban Line =

Suburban railway in Berlin, Germany

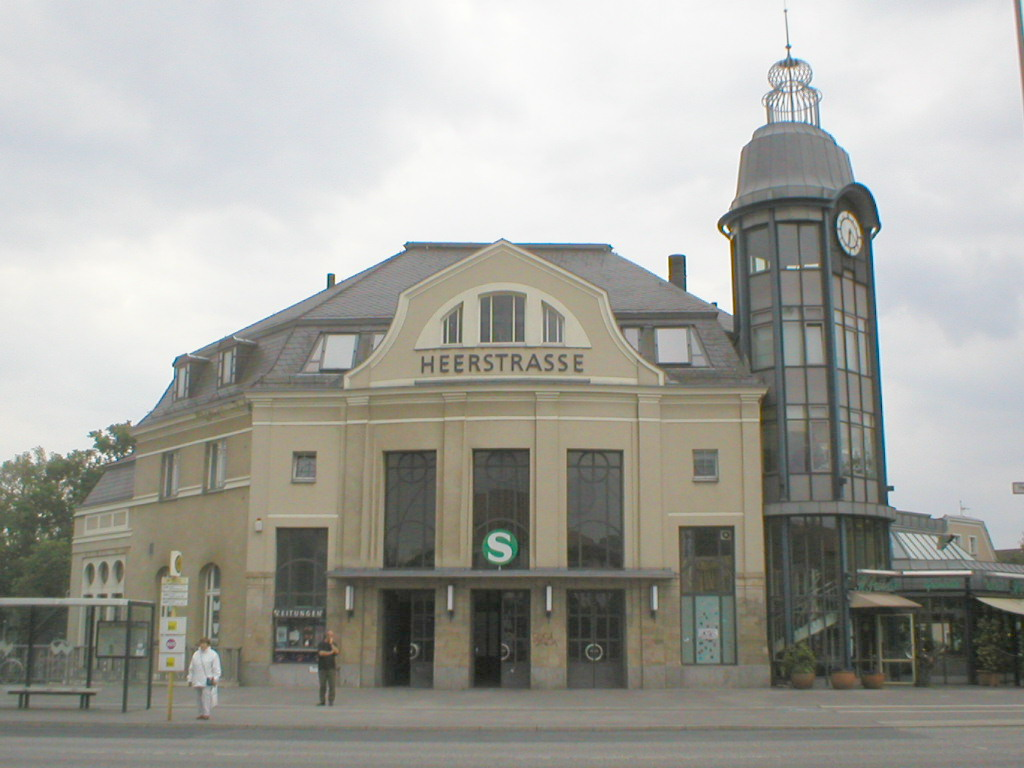
- Heerstraße station on the suburban line

Overview
- Line number: 6025
- Locale: Berlin, Germany

Service
- Route number: 200.75, 200.9

Technical
- Line length: 8.8 km (5.5 mi)
- Track gauge: 1,435 mm (4 ft 8 1/2 in) standard gauge
- Electrification: 750 V DC third rail

The Spandau suburban railway (German: Spandauer Vorortbahn) is a suburban railway in Berlin. It is an extension of the Stadtbahn (city railway) from Westkreuz to Spandau. Its last kilometre runs parallel with the Lehrte and Hamburg lines. It is currently used by Berlin S-Bahn lines S3 and S9.

== Route ==
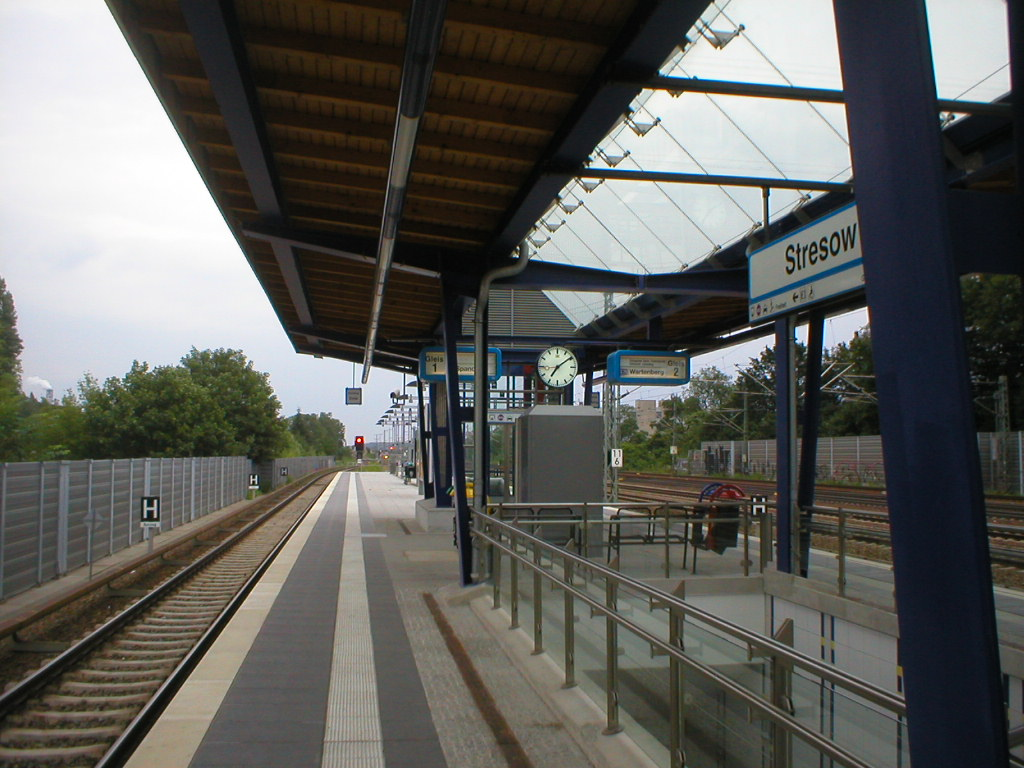
Stresow station

A new line was built between 1907 and 1911 on the northern edge of the Grunewald forest for suburban services to Spandau and new housing developments. At Heerstraße station, it branches off the line built in 1882 connecting the Berlin-Hamburg railway with the cross-city railway "Stadtbahn" via the Charlottenburg station, and then runs in a cutting to the west. About a kilometre beyond Heerstraße station the new Rennbahn (racetrack) station was built. Like other stations built for special event services at that time, it was generously provided with a terminal station with eight platforms on one side of the line. Its through station had another two platforms. From there the line runs on to the Pichelsberg station The line then makes a wide curve to the north and goes on an embankment. It continues to the north between the nature reserves of Tiefwerder Wiesen and Murellenberge, Murellenschlucht and Schanzenwald to reach the Hamburg and Lehrte lines, where it turns west.

== History ==
The 1916 Olympic Games were awarded in Berlin and the Deutsche Stadion (German Stadium) was built for the games next to the Grunewald racetrack. Rennbahn station was renamed Stadion (Stadium) in 1913. As a result of World War I the games were cancelled.

In the course of the 1927/28 electrification with third rail of the Stadtbahn and Ringbahn local tracks, plus the suburban lines connecting to the Stadtbahn, a new two-level station was built as interchange of the Stadtbahn and Ringbahn to the west of Charlottenburg station. For this the suburban and long-distance tracks between Heerstraße and Charlottenburg were rearranged, also making room for the new Exhibition Ground. This new Stadtbahn-Ring interchange station was originally called Ausstellung (Exhibition), later renamed to Westkreuz (literally western cross(–ing)).

In addition, Messe Süd Station (then called Eichkamp) was built at the intersection of the Berlin-Blankenheim, the Spandau suburban and the Ring lines. The former station of Eichkamp on the Berlin-Blankenheim line closed and re-opened on the Spandau suburban line. A few weeks before the movement of the station was completed, electrification of the line was completed to Spandau.

The 1936 Summer Olympics were held in Berlin. The stadium built for the 1916 games was torn down and replaced by the current Olympic Stadium. The railway was not upgraded, but the passenger ramp at the Rennbahn station was upgraded. The station was renamed Stadion – Rennbahn Grunewald in 1930 and Reichssportfeld (Reich sportsfield) in 1935. In 1960 it received its current name of Olympiastadion (Olympic Stadium).

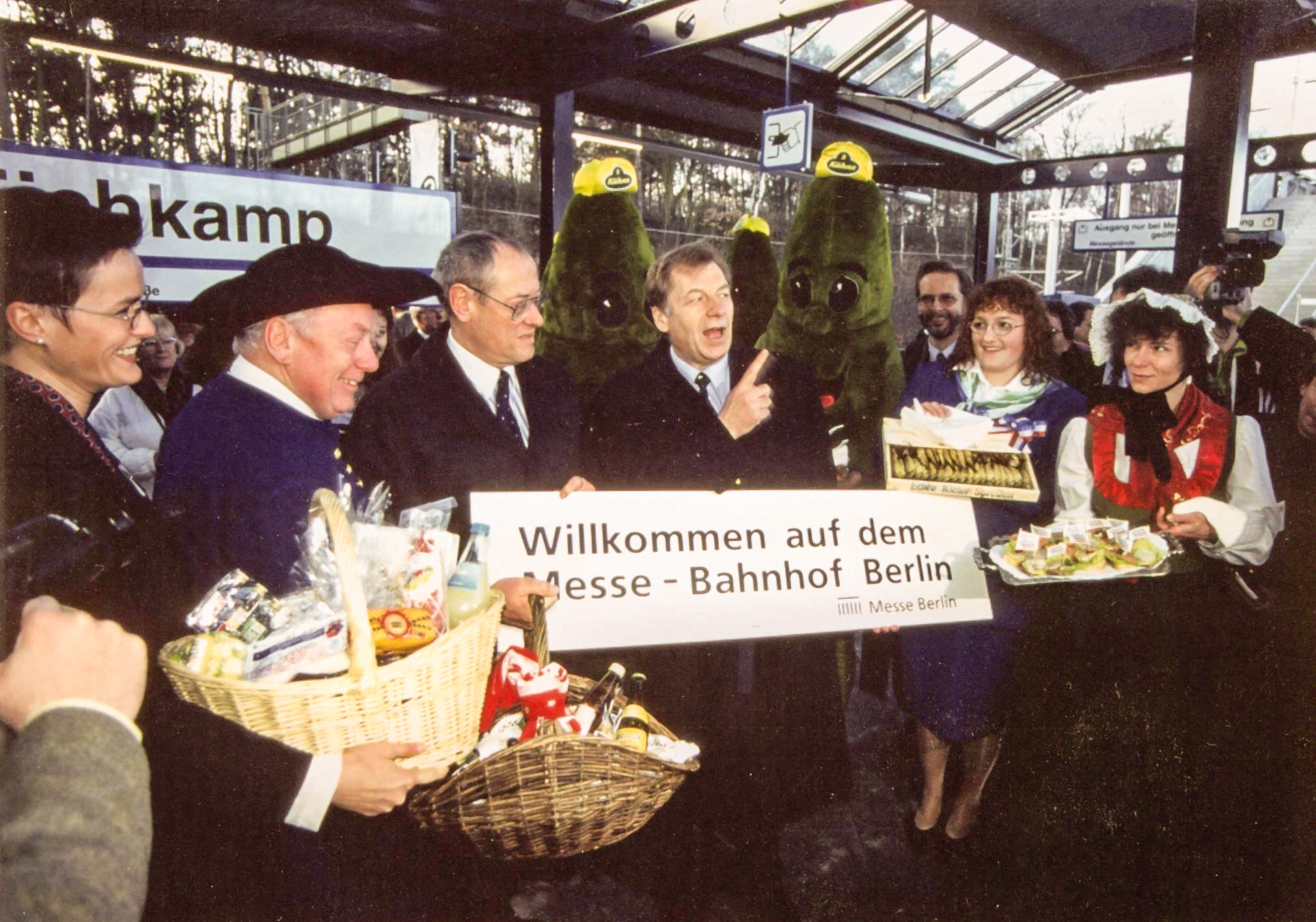
Reopening of the Westkreuz-Pichelsberg section on 16 January 1998

World War II had no major impact on the line and operations were quickly restored, but passengers number did not return to previous levels. The West Berlin S-Bahn boycott reduced traffic. Like most stretches of the S-train network in West Berlin it did not reopen after a strike by West Berlin employees of the East German Railways on 17 September 1980. It took almost 18 years for trains to return to the track. On 16 January 1998 trains initially ran from Westkreuz to Pichelsberg; on 30 December of that year trains returned to the terminus at Spandau.

In 2002, Eichkamp station was renamed as Messe Süd (Eichkamp). The renaming of the station along with the Ring line station of Witzleben to Messe Nord/ICCC was carried out to make access to the exhibition grounds more recognisable for visitors, but was met with protest by the inhabitants of the Eichkamp district. The two stations are heavily used for exhibitions such as Grünen Woche (Green Week, an agricultural show) and IFA (an electronics show).
