= Heerstraße =

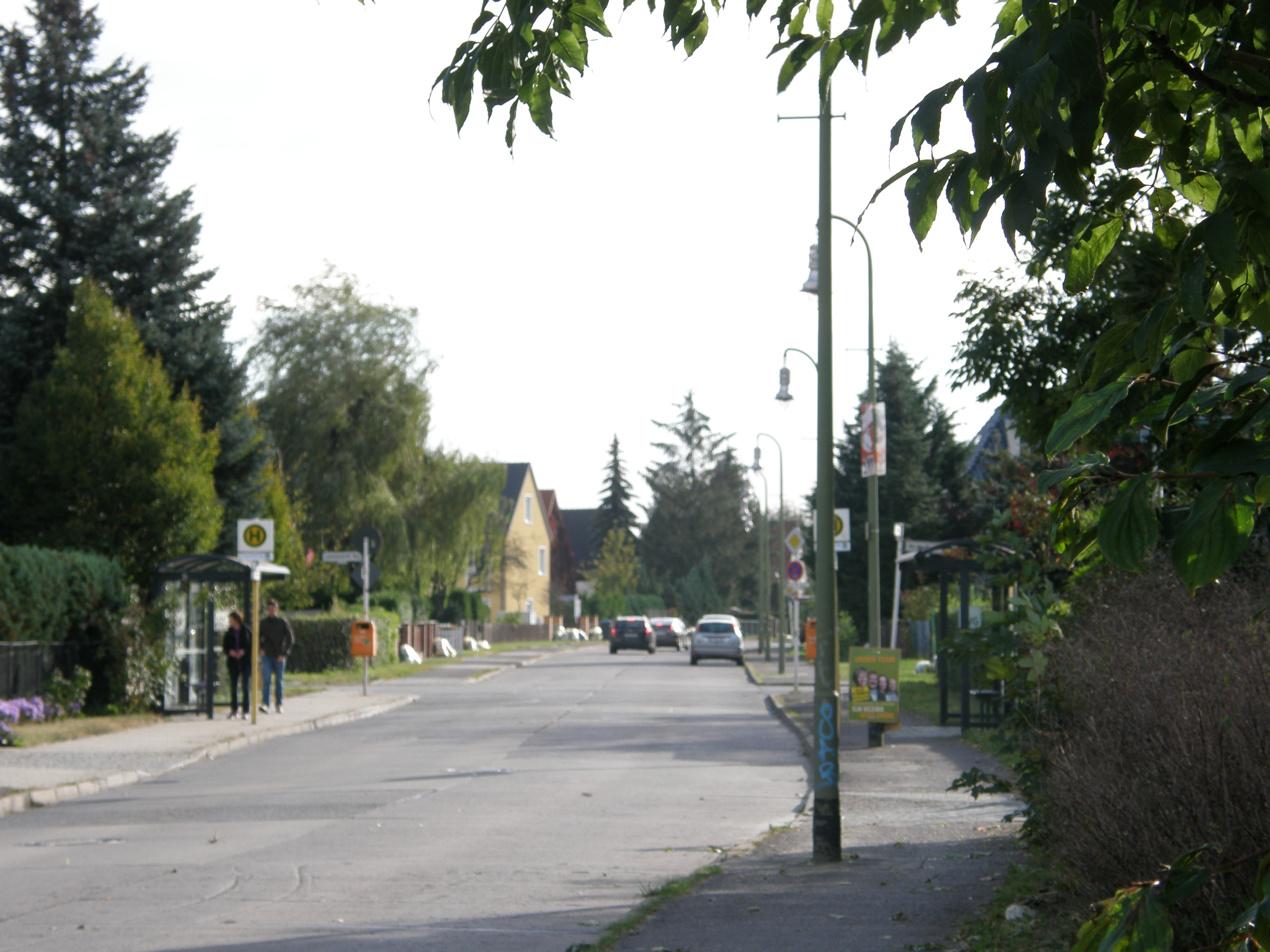

Heerstraße is the German word for military road, a type or road that was built to enable the rapid movement of armies.

Specific roads built for this purpose include the:

- Aachen-Frankfurter Heerstraße
- Bernauer Heerstraße
- Lüneburger Heerstraße
- Heerstraße (Berlin)

Heerstraße is also used in:

- Berlin Heerstraße station, a railway station in Berlin
- Heerstraße (Frankfurt U-Bahn), a metro station on the Frankfurt U-Bahn
- British War Cemetery, Heerstraße, on the list of cemeteries in Berlin
- in Bremen since 1914 the name of former chaussees (for example, the Schwachhauser Heerstraße)
- a road in Frankfurt am Main, once part of the historic Elisabethenstraße

== See also ==
- Roman road
- Military road
