= Berlin Heerstraße station =

Railway station in Berlin, Germany

Coordinates: 52°30′31″N 13°15′31″E

Heerstraße
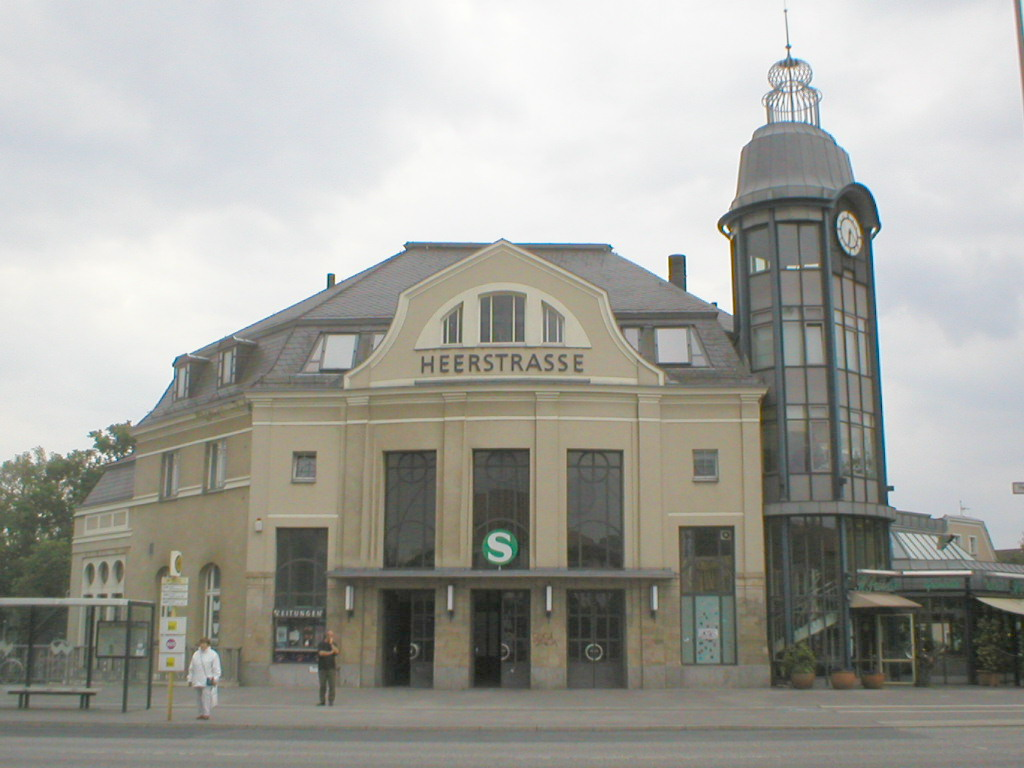
- 2004

General information
- Location: Heerstraße; Charlottenburg-Wilmersdorf, Berlin, Berlin; Germany
- Tracks: 2

Other information
- Station code: 7728
- DS100 code: BHST
- Category: 4
- Fare zone: VBB: Berlin B/5656

History
- Opened: 1 November 1909

Services
Preceding station	Berlin S-Bahn	Following station
Olympiastadion towards Spandau	S3	Messe Süd towards Erkner
Olympiastadion towards Spandau	S9	Messe Süd towards BER Airport
Location

Heerstraße is a railway station in Berlin, Germany. It is located on the Spandau Suburban Line in the Westend district and served by S-Bahn S3 and S9 trains. The station is today listed as a historical monument.

== Location ==
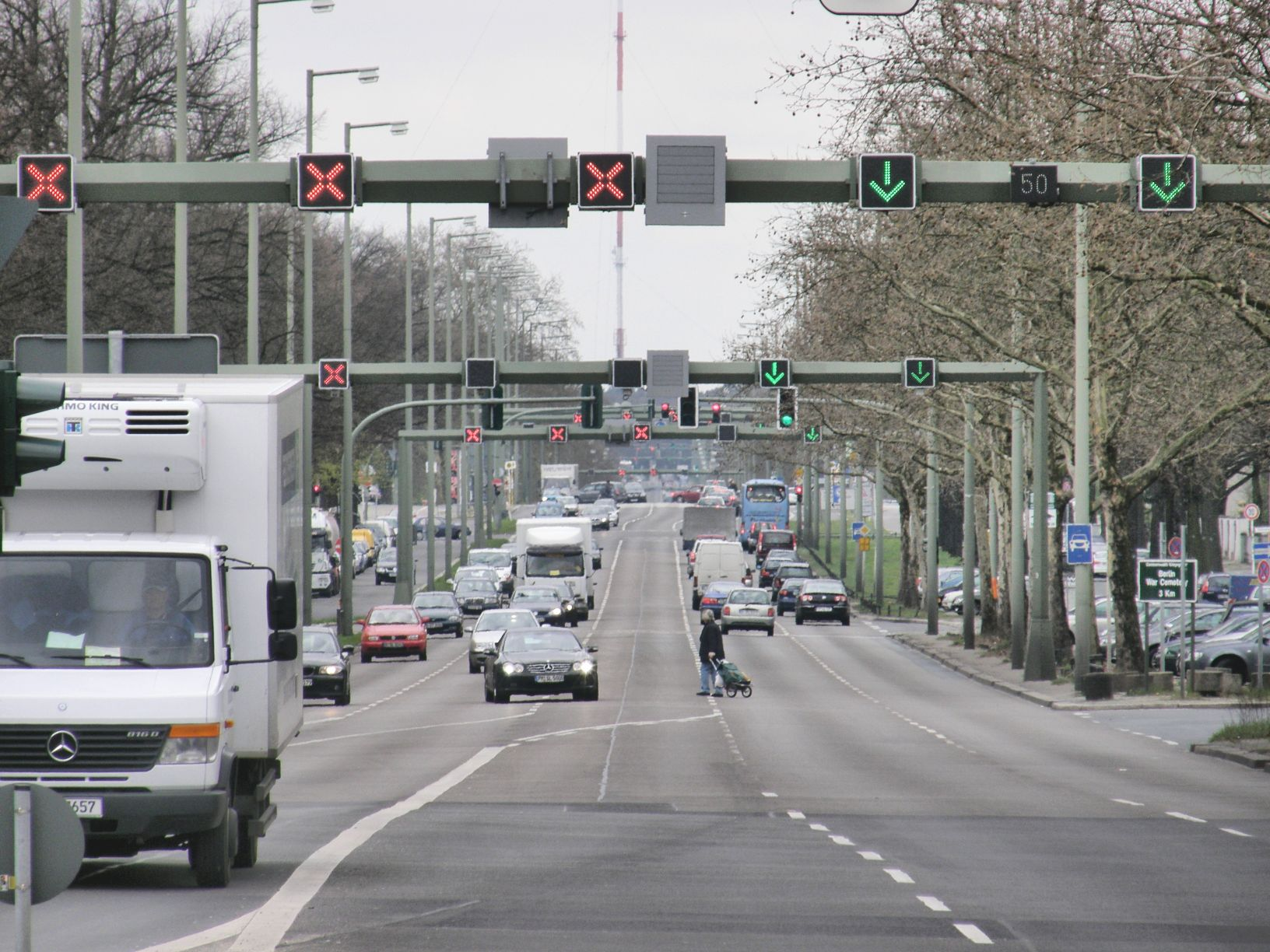
Heerstraße (2008)

The station is situated on the Heerstraße road, the major thoroughfare from Berlin's inner city to the west. The street, a section of the Bundesstraße 2 and 5 highways, originally led to the former proving grounds in Döberitz, thus the name Heer (land army). The large Grunewald forest with the Teufelsberg hill is located nearby in the south.

== History ==
The station opened on 1 November 1909, where the new Spandau suburban railway (Westbahn) branched off the western continuation of the Berlin Stadtbahn line at Westkreuz station to reach the Berlin–Lehrte and Berlin–Hamburg railways at Spandau. While the line served to develop the Westend mansions' colony, the first section to Rennbahn station (today: Olympiastadion) was built to reach the Rennbahn Grunewald - later rebuilt as Deutsches Stadion due to host the 1916 Summer Olympics that never took place. The broad Heerstraße road was laid out a few years before and was regularly used as a parade route by the passing Guards Corps of the Imperial German Army. The station became part of the electrified S-Bahn commuter rail network in August 1928.

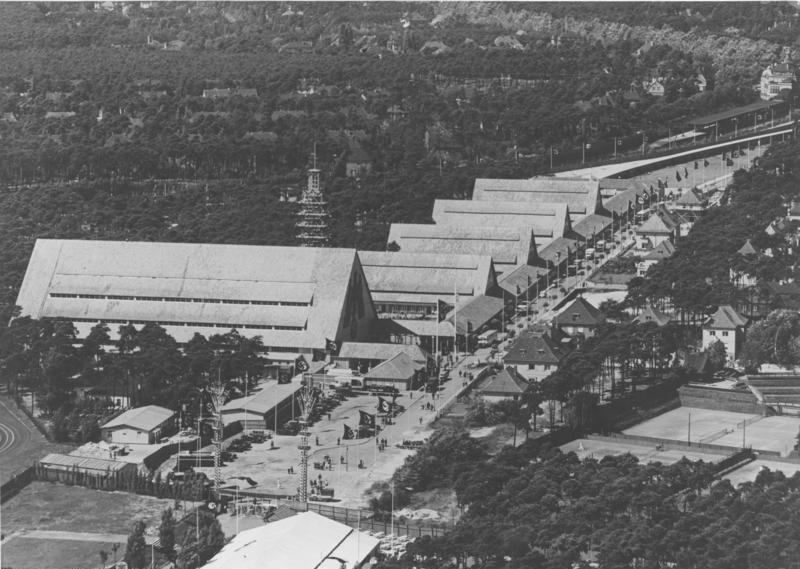
KdF City with Heerstraße station (upper right), c. 1936

Due to its direct connection to the city centre the station had occasionally been the site of official receptions: On 11 May 1925 the newly elected Reich President Paul von Hindenburg arrived here from Hanover, received by Chancellor Hans Luther, to take office the next day. After the Nazi seizure of power, the Heerstraße road became part of the monumental "East-West-Axis" avenue according to the Welthauptstadt Germania renewal plans. Both the street and the railway line were important transport links to the 1936 Summer Olympics at the Olympiastadion and the Olympic Village in Elstal. A "Strength Through Joy" (KdF) City was laid out on the Messe fairground southeast of the station to receive and accommodate numerous visitors. One year later, on 27 September 1937, Adolf Hitler received the Italian Duce Benito Mussolini at the station and carried him in a triumphal procession to the Reich Chancellery. Plans drafted in 1938 to rebuild the entrance hall in a lavish Nazi neoclassical style as Mussolini-Bahnhof were never carried out.

On 4 July 1944 resistance fighter Adolf Reichwein, on his way to a conspiratorial meeting with Communist Party leaders to prepare for the 20 July plot, was betrayed and arrested by Gestapo henchmen at Heerstraße station.

Severely damaged in World War II, the entrance hall in 1959 was rebuilt in a simplified style. In 1980 train services by the Deutsche Reichsbahn discontinued and were not resumed until after German reunification. The adjacent Heerstraße Bridge across the tracks was rebuilt from 1994 to 1996. Largely restored, the station was re-opened on 16 January 1998.
