= Heerstraße (Berlin) =

Street in Berlin

- Heerstrasse
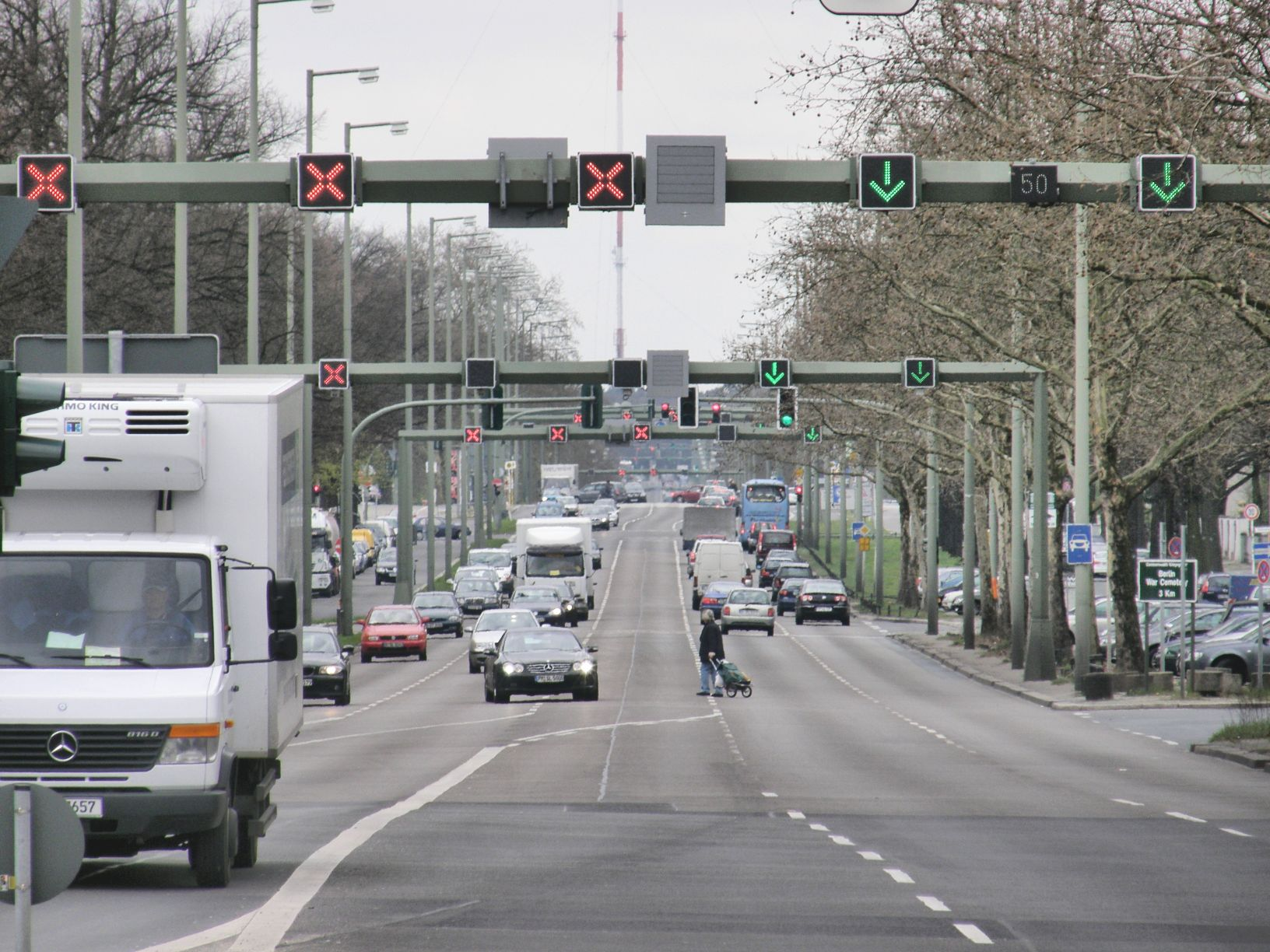
- The beginning of Heerstraße at Theodor-Heuss-Platz
- Interactive map of Heerstraße
- Former names: Döberitzer Heerstraße; (before 1908–c. 1921); An der Heerstraße; (c. 1921–1950)
- Part of: Bundesstraße 2; Bundesstraße 5
- Namesake: Imperial German Army
- Type: Arterial road
- Length: 10.8 km (6.7 mi)
- Location: Berlin, Germany
- Quarter: Westend, Wilhelmstadt, Staaken
- Nearest metro station: Theodor-Heuss-Platz; Heerstraße; Olympiastadion; Pichelsberg; RE 4 RB 21 Staaken
- Coordinates: 52°30′48″N 13°11′43″E
- East end: Kaiserdamm; Reichsstraße; Masurenallee; Theodor-Heuss-Platz
- Major junctions: Jafféstraße; Preußenallee; Teufelsseestraße; Flatowallee; Am Postfenn; Havelchaussee; (Through an underpass); Pichelsdorfer Straße; Gatower Straße; Wilhelmstraße; Magistratsweg; Nennhauser Damm
- West end: Brandenburg border / Hamburger Chaussee

Heerstraße, or Heerstrasse (see ß; German pronunciation: [ˈheːɐ̯ˌʃtʁaːsə]; literally: Army Street), runs from Theodor-Heuss-Platz in Berlin-Charlottenburg to the western city border of Berlin in the locality of Staaken in the borough of Spandau. It is part of Bundesstraße 5; from Theodor-Heuss-Platz to Wilhelmstraße it is forms part of Bundesstraße 2. With a length of around 10 kilometres, it is one of the longest streets in Berlin and an important commuter route. The street is a five-lane expressway (Kraftfahrstraße), depending on traffic flow the middle lane is available during rush hours in the morning (eastbound) and in the evening (westbound).

== History ==
=== Planning and construction ===
The construction of the street started in 1874 from Berlin-Charlottenburg to Pichelsberg. In 1911 the street was opened in full length as Döberitzer Heerstraße in attendance of Emperor Wilhelm II. It was constructed in stages since 1903. This all was in connection with the construction of a wide street for representation purposes, which started at the Berlin Castle as Unter den Linden Street to Ernst-Reuter-Platz. It was then extended via Bismarckstraße and Kaiserdamm. From 1920 on the name was shortened to Heerstraße.

Until 1964 Heerstraße was also a tram route. The former tramway is today's green strip between Theodor-Heuss-Platz and Stößenseebrücke.

== Routing ==
=== Theodor-Heuss-Platz to S-Bahnhof Heerstraße ===
Heerstraße starts at Theodor-Heuss-Platz in Westend of Charlottenburg district, close to the exhibition ground, the Funkturm and the International Congress Centre (ICC).

In the east-west direction it has houses until the S-Bahnhof Heerstraße. Until 30 March 1950 this part of Heerstraße was known as Kaiserdamm.

=== S-Bahnhof Heerstraße to Scholzplatz ===
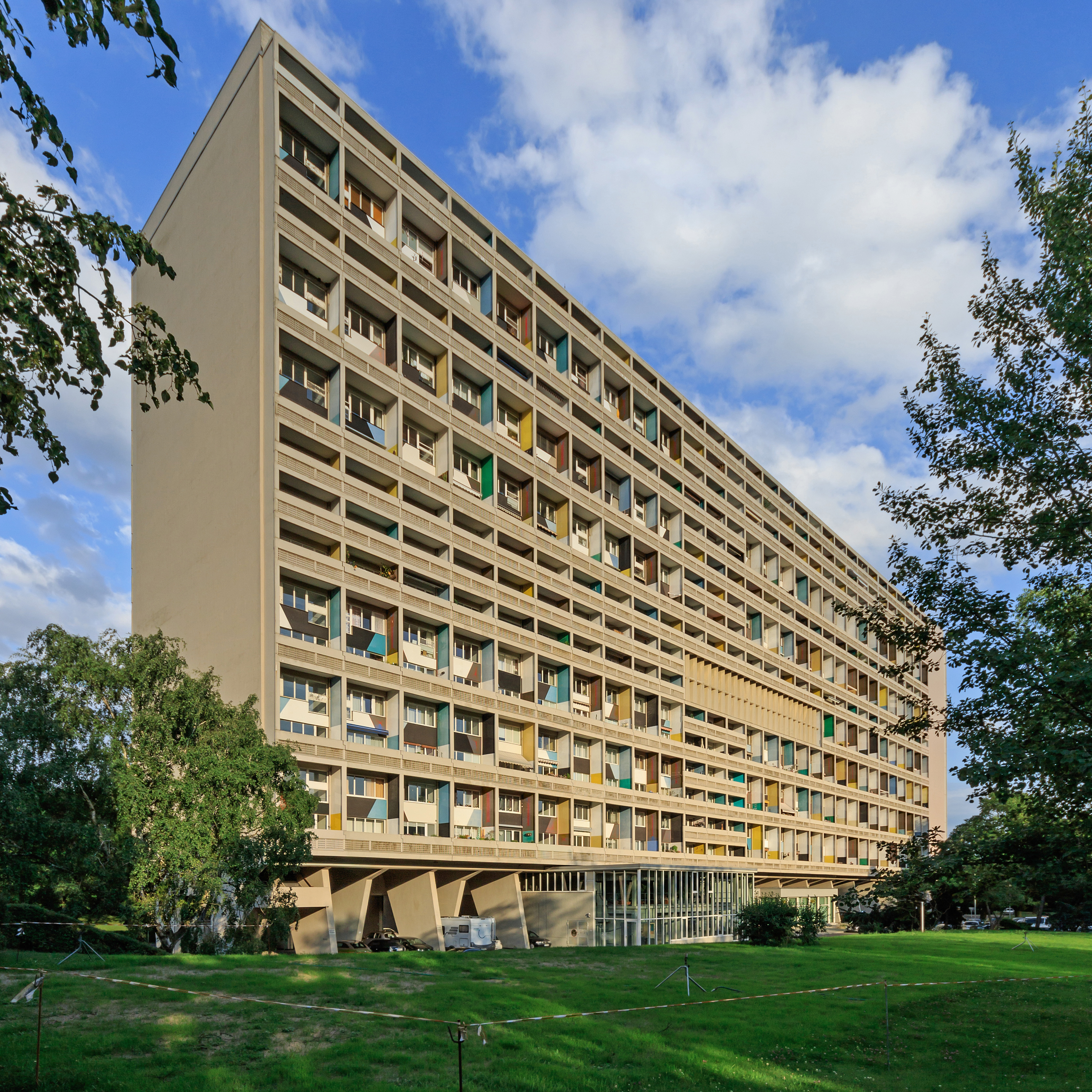
The Corbusier-House close to Heerstraße

From there the Heerstraße runs south of the Olympic Stadium and passes a former housing area (nicknamed "Little Britain") of the British Forces in Berlin. Close to Scholzplatz was also the British Military Hospital (BMH), from 1967 to 1994, which is today the Paulinen Hospital. South of the Heerstraße starts the Grunewald which stretches down to Wannsee.

=== Scholzplatz to Pichelsdorfer Straße ===
At Scholzplatz, the road curves slightly towards the north-west. On the southern side is the Commonwealth War Cemetery, also known as Berlin War Cemetery, and the Jewish cemetery. Behind the cemetery is the 230-metre high Radiomast Scholzplatz of the public broadcaster RBB. Further west, Heerstraße crosses the Stößensee bridge, above the Havelchaussee and lake Stößensee. Also, the road reaches the district of Spandau here. At the 800 metre afterwards following Freybrücke, above the Havel river, is the Jordanian Embassy. Pichelsdorf comes then south of Heerstraße and the lake Grimnitzsee in the north.

=== Pichelsdorfer Straße to Sandstraße ===
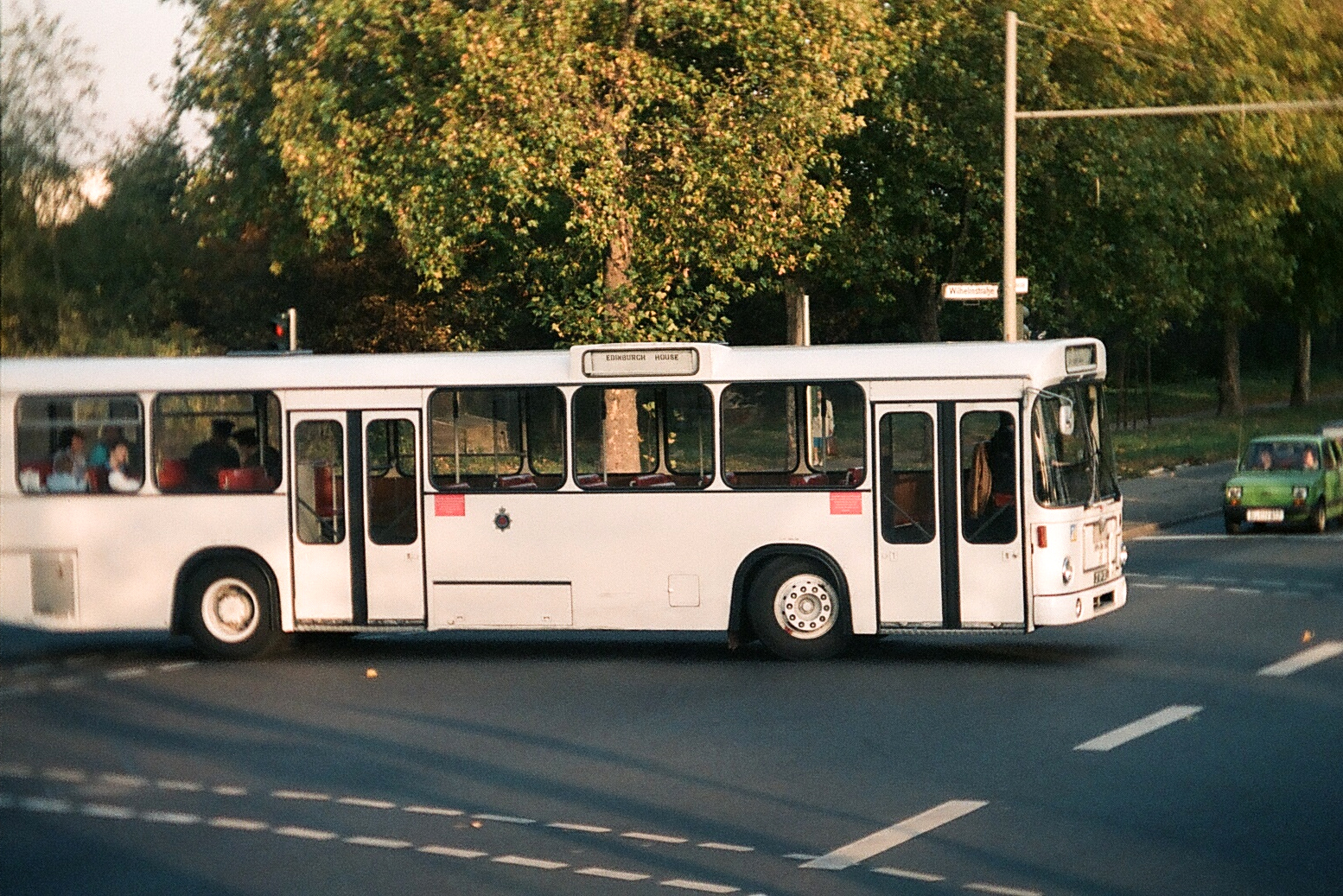
Route bus of the British Route Bus Service at Wilhelmstraße in 1983

Pichelsdorfer Straße runs from Heerstraße northbound and connects from here to the Spandauer Altstadt (Oldtown).

Behind Gatower Straße, where a lot of bus routes meet, is the location for the BVG bus depot Spandau (northern side).

Afterwards, the route of Bundesstraße 2 turns south into Wilhelmstraße and connects with Potsdam. The route of Bundesstraße 5 remains on Heerstraße till the end. Also on Wilhelmstraße northbound are the former Smuts Barracks and still the former Britannia Centre Spandau, the location where Spandau Prison used to be.

=== Sandstraße to Bergstraße ===
The next crossing is Sandstraße, which was until it was cut in the early 1970s, was leading to another housing area of the British Forces. The cut off part of the Sandstraße is known today as Leubnitzer Weg. The Sandstraße is also the beginning of the locality of Staaken.

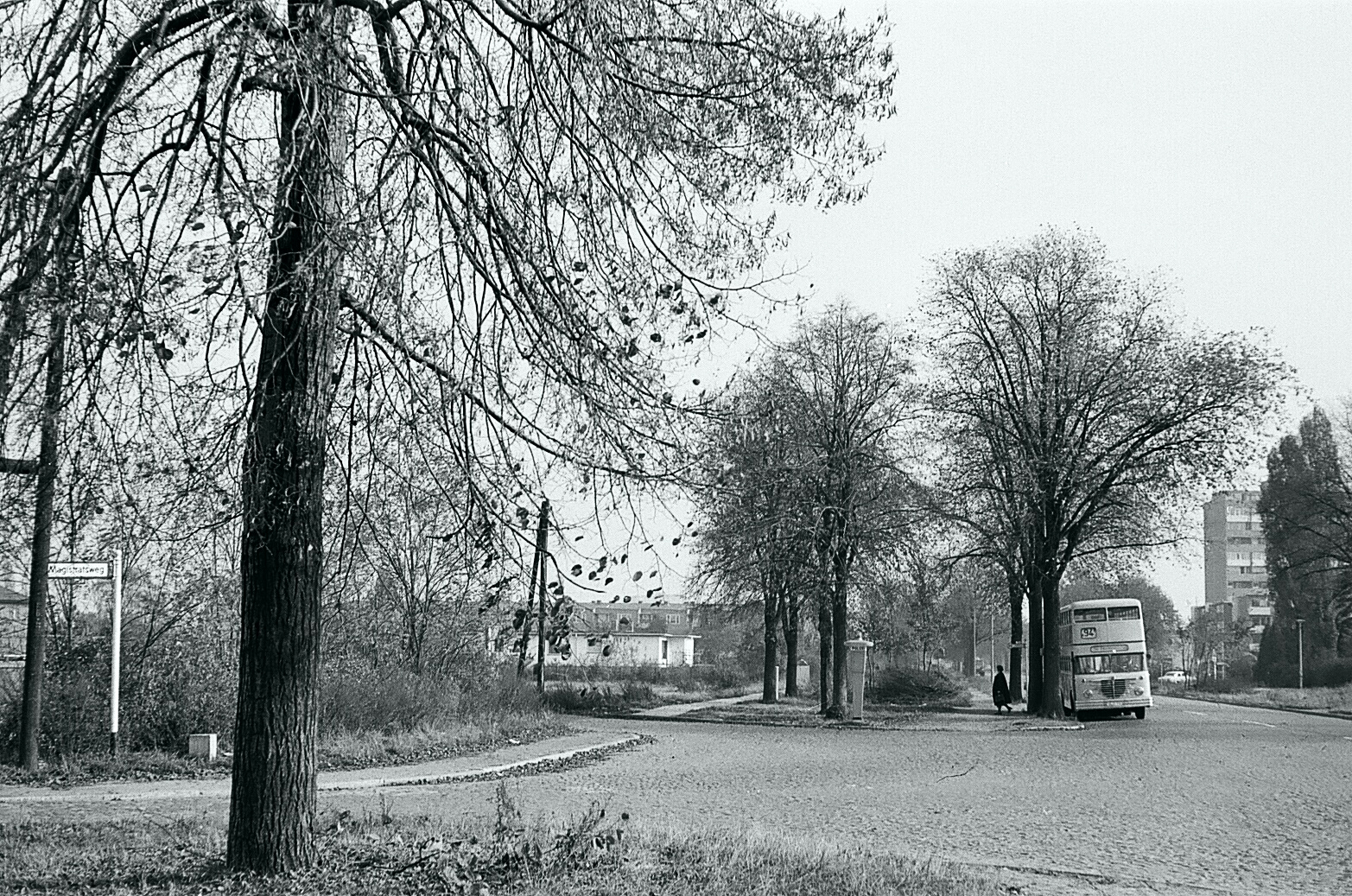
Northern side of the 5-end crossing. The Seeburger Weg is behind Magistratsweg (1966).

Until around 1973 the next crossing after Sandstraße was Seeburger Weg and Magistratsweg. The Seeburger Weg met Heerstraße from the southwest. The Magistratsweg came from the north to end on Heerstraße as the fifth arm of this junction.

With new blocks of houses being built on the Seeburger Weg between Heerstraße and Maulbeerallee, the southern end of the Seeburger Weg became known as Semmelländer Weg. It was then merged with the Magistratsweg to become a new crossing, as it is known today.

The next major intersection is Reimerweg, where the remaining half of Tauentzienbrücke crosses Heerstraße.

After Reimerweg, Gärtnereiring branches off on the northern side to run parallel to Heerstraße until close to Bergstraße, as the Heerstraße customs checkpoint began there. Today the customs buildings are used by an observatory club.

=== Bergstraße to the city border ===
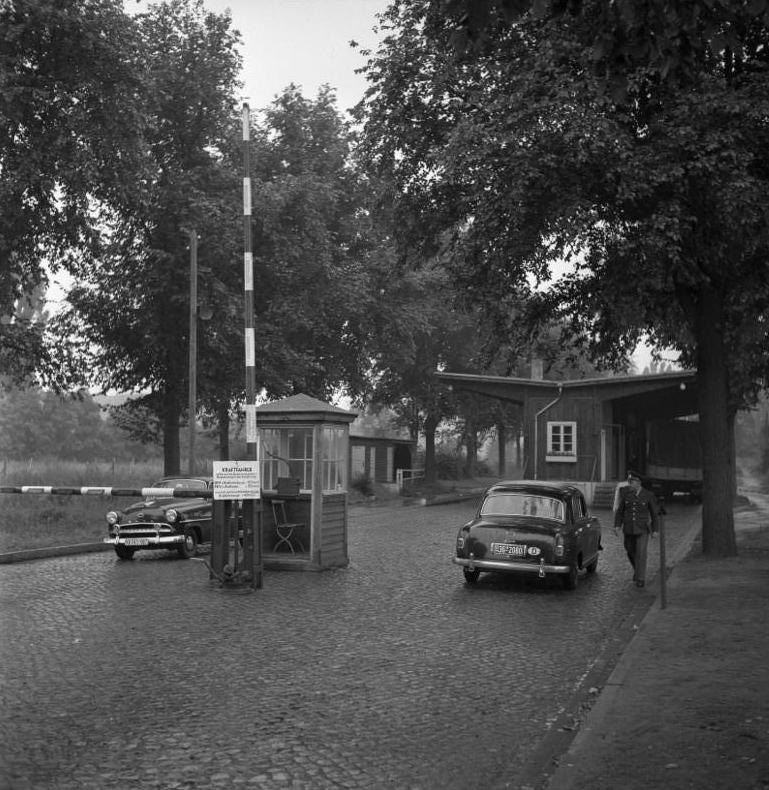
The border crossing in 1955

At Bergstraße began the territory of East Germany. A few meters west of Bergstraße was the Berlin Wall. The Heerstraße Checkpoint stretched in its latest stage as far as Weidenweg.

Close to its end, Heerstraße is joined by Nennhauser Damm which was in its northern end also the border between the SOZ/GDR with one half being GDR and the other half being West Berlin.

This final stretch of Heerstraße connected together with Nennhauser Damm to Staaken Airfield until it was finally closed in the early 1950s. The airport buildings were later used as a hospital.

=== Further westbound ===
The continuing of Heerstraße as Bundesstraße 5 in the Federal State of Brandenburg is named Hamburger Chaussee. It leads through the Havelland, crosses the Berlin Ring and runs via Hamburg right up to the Danish border. In Denmark it continues in Sæd as Primærrute 11 in Tønder Province up to Aalborg.

== See also ==
- Freybrücke
