= Berlin-Stresow station =

Railway station in Berlin, Germany

Stresow
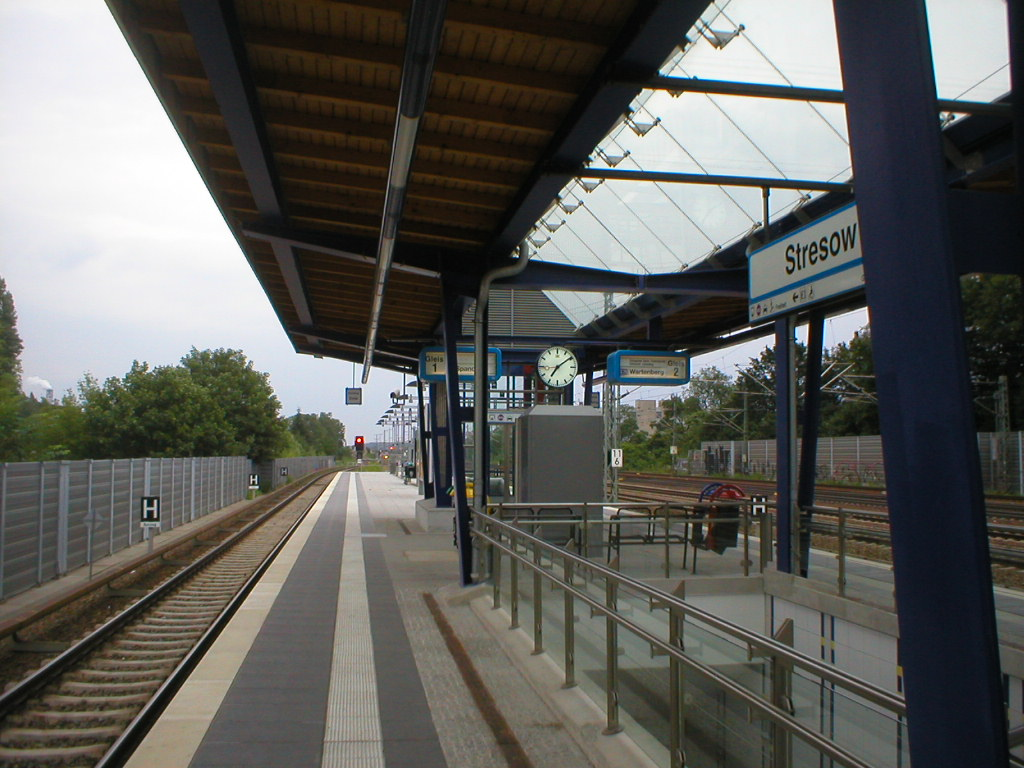

General information
- Location: Spandau, Berlin, Berlin; Germany
- Coordinates: 52°31′55″N 13°12′32″E
- Lines: Berlin Westkreuz–Berlin-Spandau (KBS 200.75, 200.9); Berlin–Hamburg (KBS 204, 209.10, 209.14; no stopping); Berlin–Lehrte (KBS 202; no stopping)

Construction
- Architect: Friedrich Neuhaus

Other information
- Station code: 7761
- DS100 code: BSRW
- Category: 5
- Fare zone: : Berlin B/5656

History
- Opened: 15 October 1846; 179 years ago
- Closed: for main line stops: 19 May 1997; 29 years ago
- Electrified: 23 August 1928; 98 years ago main line: 30 May 1992; 34 years ago
- Former names: 1846-1871 Spandau; 1871-1890 Hamburger Bahnhof; 1890-1911 Spandau Personenbahnhof; 1911-1936 Spandau Hauptbahnhof; 1936-1998 Berlin-Spandau

Key dates
- 1846: current building erected
- 1945 April 24 - June 9: operation interrupted
- 1952 May 18 - 1976 September 25: no main line stopping
- 1980 September 19 - 1998 December 29: operation interrupted
- 1997 May 19 - 1998 December 29: operation interrupted

Services
Preceding station	Berlin S-Bahn	Following station
Spandau Terminus	S3	Pichelsberg towards Erkner
Spandau Terminus	S9	Pichelsberg towards BER Airport
Location

Stresow is a railway station in the Spandau district of Berlin, named after the Stresow neighbourhood east of the Havel river. It is served by the S-Bahn lines S3 and S9.

== History ==
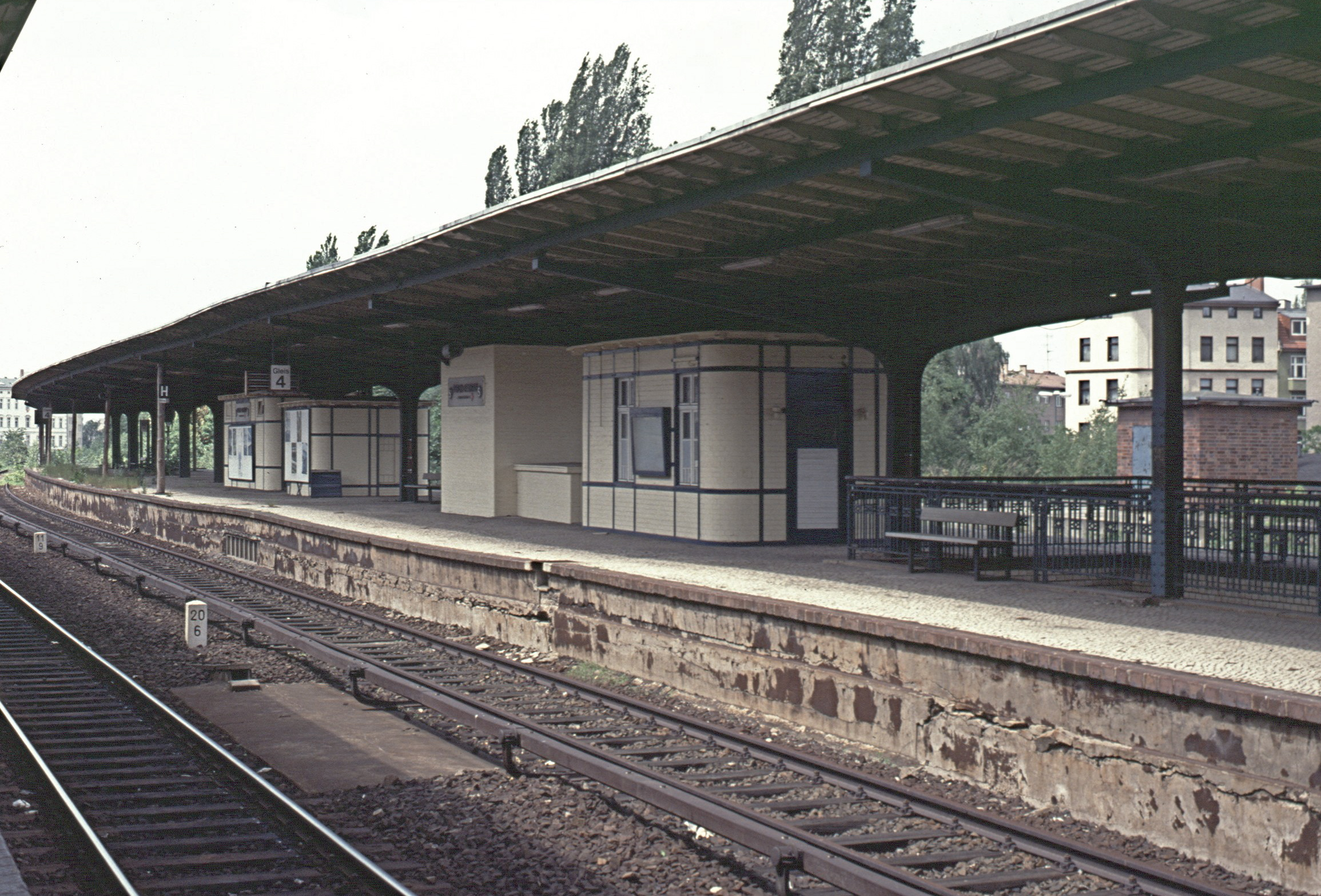
Stresow station in 1991.

The station opened on 15 December 1846 on the railway line from Berlin's Hamburger Bahnhof to the city of Hamburg. Then the main station in the area, it bore the name Spandau. When in 1871 the parallel railway line from the Lehrter Bahnhof in Berlin to Lehrte opened with a second station west of the Havel river, the name Spandau received the addition of Hamburger Bahnhof to distinguish it from the new station called Lehrter Bahnhof. As both lines were nationalised by the Prussian state railways in 1880 and 1884, the former Lehrter Bahnhof was closed for passenger service and became a freight-only station. Named Spandau Hauptbahnhof (main station) from 1911 and Berlin-Spandau from 1936, the station was renamed Stresow on 19 May 1997, when the Spandau-West station at the site of the historic Lehrter Bahnhof took over the name of Berlin-Spandau.

An S-Bahn station from 1928, service was interrupted in 1980 and not resumed until 30 December 1998, when the station reopened in its current form. The entrance building from 1846 is preserved in its original condition and is one of the oldest in Germany.
