= Berlin Messe Süd railway station =

Railway station in Berlin, Germany

Coordinates: 52.4987°N 13.2702°E

Messe Süd (Eichkamp)
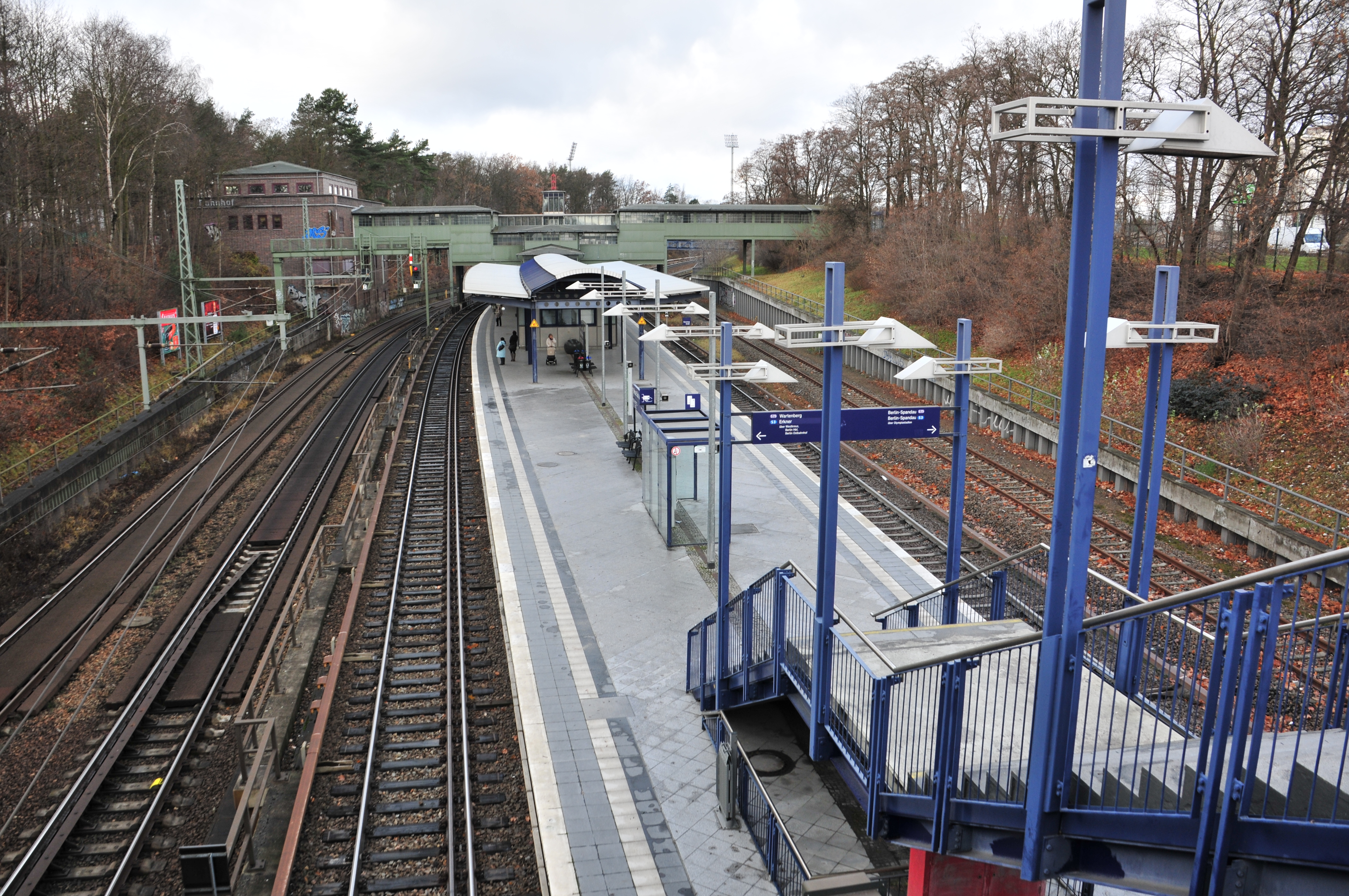

General information
- Location: Charlottenburg-Wilmersdorf, Berlin, Berlin; Germany
- Operator: DB Station&Service
- Platforms: 1
- Tracks: 2
- Train operators: S-Bahn Berlin

Other information
- Station code: 7727
- DS100 code: BMS
- Category: 4
- Fare zone: VBB: Berlin B/5656
- Website: www.bahnhof.de

Services
Preceding station	Berlin S-Bahn	Following station
Heerstraße towards Spandau	S3	Westkreuz towards Erkner
Heerstraße towards Spandau	S9	Westkreuz towards BER Airport
Location

Messe Süd is a railway station in the Westend district of Berlin. Located on the Westbahn railway to Spandau it is served by the S-Bahn lines S3 and S9.

== History ==
When the station opened in 1928 it was originally entitled Berlin Eichkamp, the name of a garden city just south of it, built in the 1920s according to plans of Max Taut. The station was renamed Messe Süd in 2002 to assist visitors to Berlin in finding their way to the Messe (trade fair) halls on its northern side.

The former AVUS racing track and the Deutschlandhalle arena are nearby.
