= Murellen mountains, Murellen gorge and Schanzenwald forest =

Hilly landscape in Germany

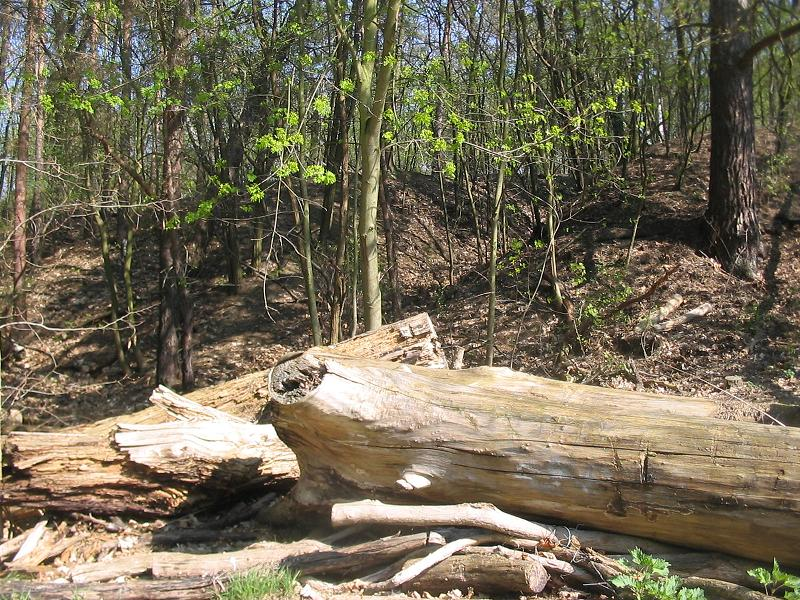
- Murellenberg and Schanzenwald

Highest point
- Peak: Murellenberg
- Elevation: 62 m (203 ft)
- Coordinates: 52°31′00″N 13°13′30″E

Geography
- Location: Ruhleben, Berlin-Westend, Germany

Geology
- Rock age(s): approx. 20000 years, Ice Age

The Murellenberge, the Murellenschlucht and the Schanzenwald are a hilly landscape formed during the Weichselian Ice Age in the Berlin district of Ruhleben in the Westend part of the District of Charlottenburg-Wilmersdorf. The area is located to the west of the Olympic site. The largest part of the upslope and terminal moraine landscape is designated as nature reserve Murellenschlucht und Schanzenwald, which is part of the biotope network Fließwiese Ruhleben, Tiefwerder Wiesen and Grunewald. About 1.5 kilometers northeast of the area (from Murellenberg) is the natural monument Murellenteich.

The Murellenberge (often referred to as 'Murellenberg', formerly: Morellenberge) are part of the Teltownordband, which forms the northernmost spur of the Teltow plateau to the Berliner Urstromtal. The connection of the original natural area was largely lost due to urban development. The up to 62 meter high mountains and the up to 30 meter incised basin have a diverse and endangered flora and fauna, especially in their dry grassland areas. Used as a military and police area for over 150 years, the forest stands in the Schanzenwald were able to develop almost undisturbed. The Waldbühne was built in the eastern part of the ravine in 1936 under the direction of the architect Werner March. The National Socialists set up an execution site in the mountains for deserters and so-called "wehrkraftzersetzer". The Installation Memorial to the Murdered by Nazi Military Justice on the Murellenberg by the artist Patricia Pisani from 2002 commemorates the victims.

== Location of the area and etymology ==
The Hügelgebiet, which was originally much more extensive and is now partly urbanized, extends to the area where the Spree flows into the Havel. Beyond today's nature reserve, it includes a police training area and the Ruhleben Cemetery to the north. The part of the Schanzenwald to the west of the police area, which was used for military purposes for a long time, is now largely accessible again and part of the nature reserve. The embankment of the Spandau suburban railroad, which was built in 1907, borders the area to the west. The railroad line also forms the border between the districts of Charlottenburg-Wilmersdorf and Spandau. To the south and east, the Murellenschlucht gorge and its continuation in the Ruhleben meadow border the site. To the north, the area is bordered by the Hempelsteig, the course of which roughly follows the Elsgraben, which once separated the area and was filled in.

The name element Murellen or formerly Morellen is traced back to the Morelle (= soft cherry) by the Brandenburg Name Book. An encyclopaedia of Berlin's street names also contains an entry under Murellenweg, which leads from the Ruhleben meadow to the Ruhleben housing estate: "Murellen, overgrown cherries that gave the Murellenberge their name." A derivation from moraine, which refers to the geological structure of the area, cannot be verified.

== Geology and climate ==
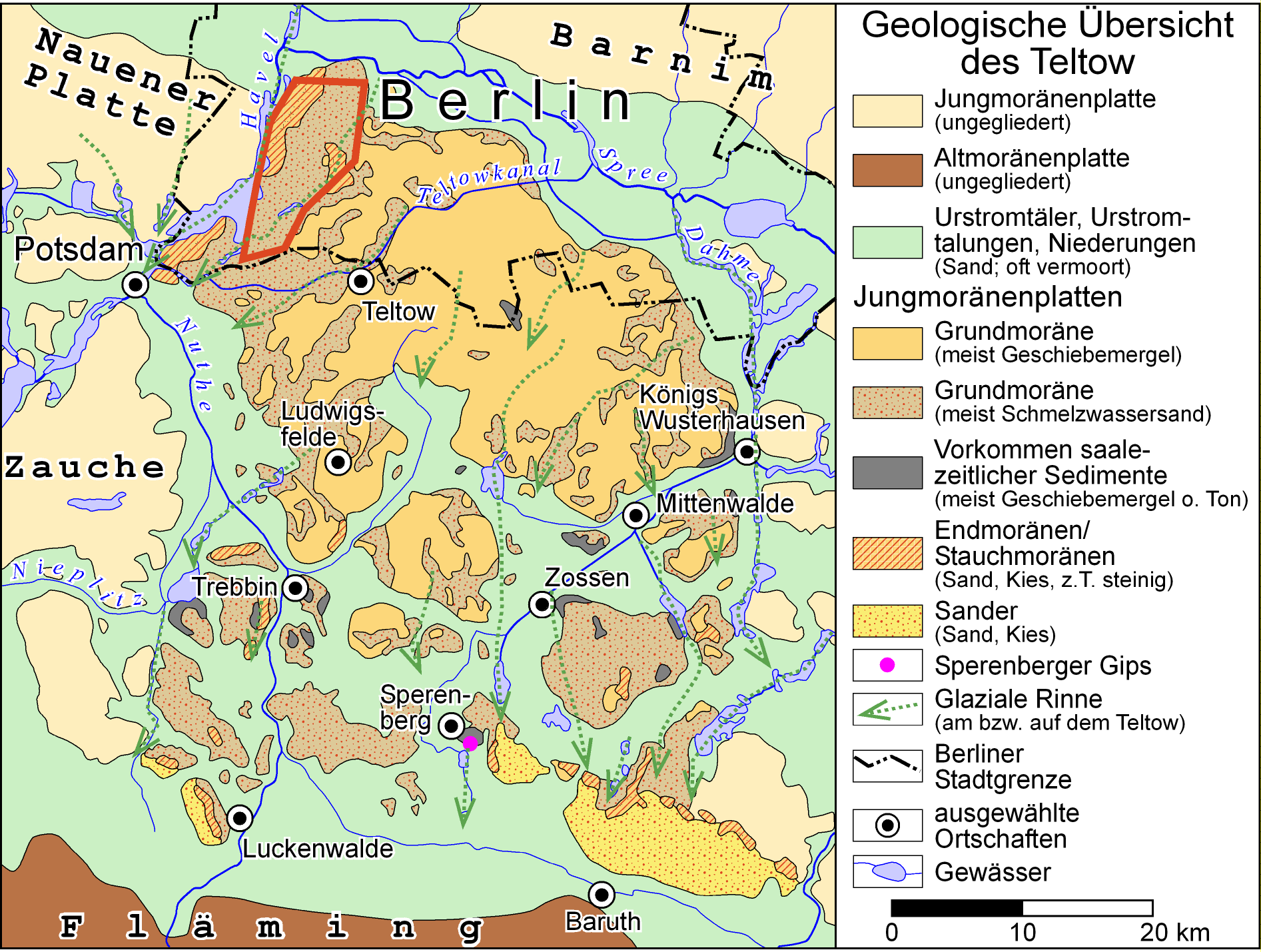
Geological overview map of the Teltow. The Murellenberge are located in the transition area between the red shaded uplift moraine and the red dotted ground moraine north of Grunewald (framed in red).

=== North band of the Teltow ===
Geologically, the Murellenberge and the Grunewald belong to the Teltow plateau, which ends to the west in the Havel lowlands and to the north in the Berlin glacial valley, through which the Spree flows. The Havel separates the soft glacial Teltow plateau from the Nauener Platte to the northwest with Gatow and parts of Wilhelmstadt. The Spreeniederung separates the plateau from the Barnim. While the ground moraine plateau of the Teltow is largely shallow and dominated by boulder clay, the Grunewald is dominated by exceptionally thick (20 meters and more) meltwater sands from the advance phase of the inland ice. In the area around Schildhorn, the Pichelsberg and the Murellenberge, the advancing ice has also severely compressed (disturbed) the sands, so that a relief of a thrust/terminal moraine determines the landscape here. The northern edge of the Teltow runs northwards from the Murellenberge along the Murellenschlucht gorge and turns north-east shortly after reaching the Ruhleben meadow. It runs around the Murellenteich pond and continues over the former Spandauer Spitze at the former Spandauer Bock and the Ruhwaldpark to the steep slope above the Fürstenbrunn mineral water spring. At this point, south of today's Rohrdammbrücke, the Teltow plateau reaches its northernmost point. The Teltowkante then bends to the southeast along the Schlossgarten Charlottenburg.

Today's dry valley Murellen Gorge is a former dead ice channel that cuts up to 30 meters deep into the hilly landscape. The gorge, which is up to 100 meters wide, runs along the southern edge of the entire area and separated the Murellenberge from the Pichelsberg, which, like the Murellenberge, has a height of 62 meters and is almost completely built over today. To the west, the Drainage channel originally stretched across the Havel valley arm Hohler Weg to the Stößensee. In the other direction, it bends to the north and continues in the Verlandungsmoor and nature conservation and Natura 2000 area Fließwiese Ruhleben. The Schanzenwald forest to the northwest is already part of the valley sand area of the Spreeniederung in the Urstromtal.

=== Boulders ===
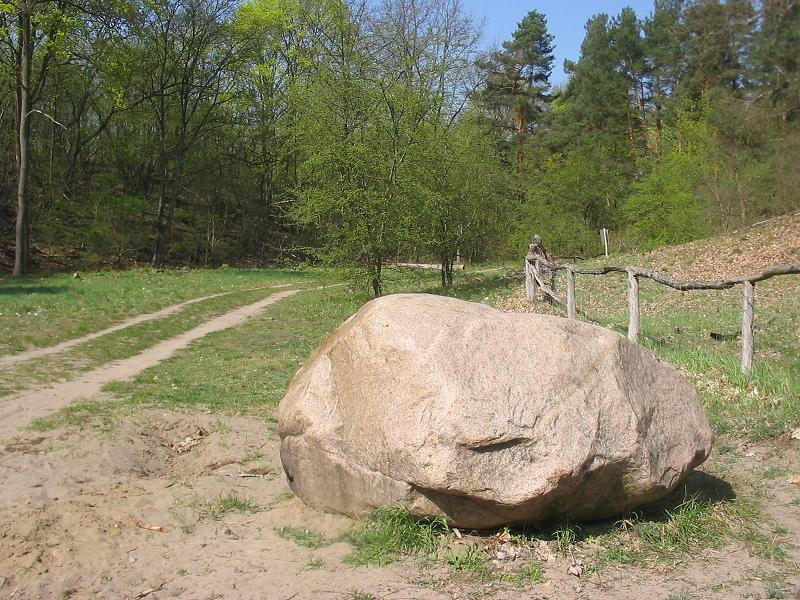
Boulder listed as a natural monument in the Murellen Gorge

Numerous erratic boulders bear witness to the landscape-shaping power of the ice in the Murellenberge. Two of the erratic blocks are protected as natural monuments (NDM) under protection: one is in the Murellen Gorge (NDM VII-6F), the other (NDM VII-5F) was moved from the Murellen Gorge to the meadow at the southern exit of the Ruhleben subway station in 1968. While the boulders of the gorge and the mountains are otherwise mainly made of granite, the stone at the station is made of gray, medium-grained sandstone (so-called lignite quartzite). As debris made of this soft material usually has a maximum head size after drifting from Scandinavia, the approximately 1.2 m^{3} boulder cannot have traveled such a long way, unlike granite or gneiss boulders. Experts therefore suspect the region around Stettin or Bad Freienwalde as the place of origin. Its dimensions are 1 m × 1 m × 1.2 m and those of the boulder in the ravine, which is probably made of biotite gneiss or alkali granite, 1.5 m × 1.5 m × 1 m.

=== Clima ===
The Murellenberge and the Schanzenwald are located in a temperate climate zone in the transition area from the atlantic climate Northern/Western Europe to the continental climate Eastern Europe. The climate corresponds to that of the outskirts of Berlin. This includes parts of the Murellen Gorge, which is said to have once been called the Kuhle Grund, to one of the inner-city "cold islands".

== Natural development and urban interventions ==
Due to increasing development, the landscape of the Murellenberge, which was shaped by the Ice Age, has lost its connection to the surrounding landscape and "its original character in many areas" over the last century.

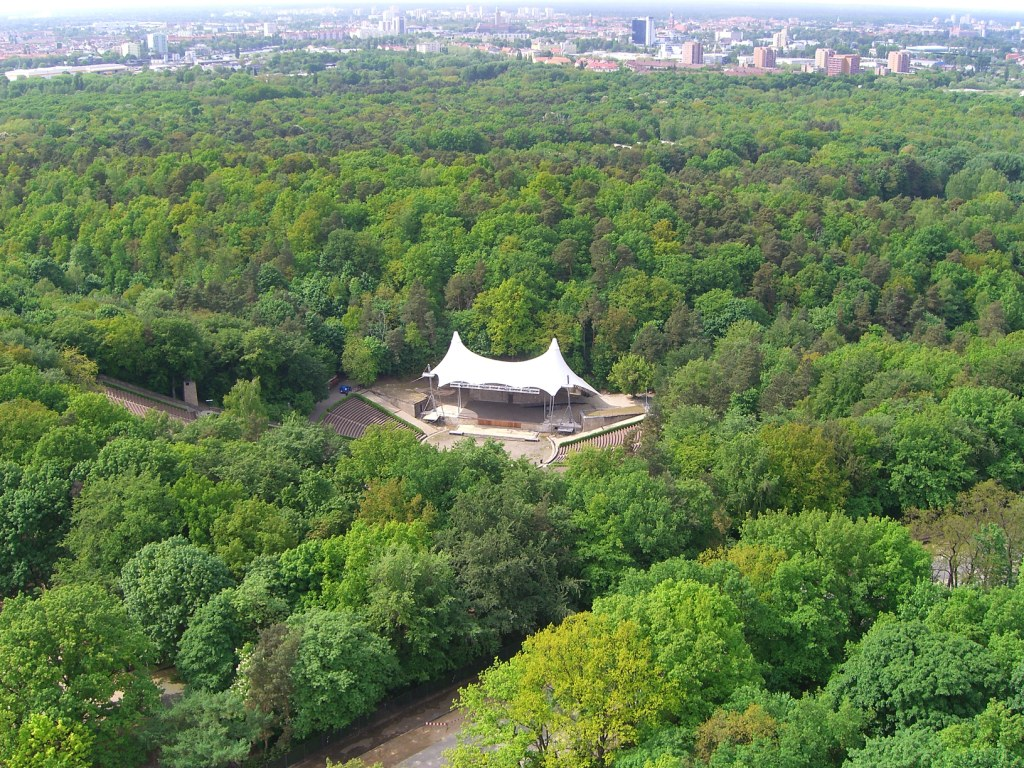
View from the bell tower of the Berlin Waldbühne, Murellenschlucht gorge, mountains and Schanzenwald forest

=== Lost connection to the Grunewald (south) ===
The northern boundary of the Grunewald forest and landscape area is now generally drawn along Heerstraße, so that the Murellenberge mountains to the north of the road are excluded from Grunewald. In the past, the mountains, the ravine and the Schanzenwald belonged to the forest or the Teltower Heide and Spandower Heide, as the Grunewald was previously known. The Prussian Kartenaufnahme of 1835 describes the Murellenschlucht as a valley within the Spandauer Heide. The separation of the Murellenberge from today's Grunewald landscape area took place from 1907 with the construction of the Grunewald Racecourse and the German Stadium on former Grunewald land and the simultaneous construction of the Heerstraße and the Spandauer Vorortbahn, which cut through the extensive natural area of the Grunewald from west to east. Further construction for the Olympic Games 1936, especially in the area of Glockenturmstraße, narrowed the forest connection. With the construction of the high-rise housing estate on Angerburger Allee in the 1960s, the direct green connection between the Murellenberge/Schanzenwald area and the Grunewald was finally lost. However, the area is still assigned to the Grunewald by the forestry office, as it belongs to the Saubucht forestry district.

As part of the construction work for the 1936 Summer Games, the eastern part of the Murellenschlucht was built under the direction of Werner March according to plans by Conrad Heidenreich the Waldbühne, an open-air stage with space for 22,000 spectators. The construction in the form of a natural basin meant a considerable intervention in the natural environment, even if the natural slopes of the Murellenberge were largely retained. The southern slope and parts of the ravine were also filled with rubble between 1948 and 1950. Today, the new ice rink and the central buildings of the natural gas storage facility below stand on the embankment. Berlin of Gasag.

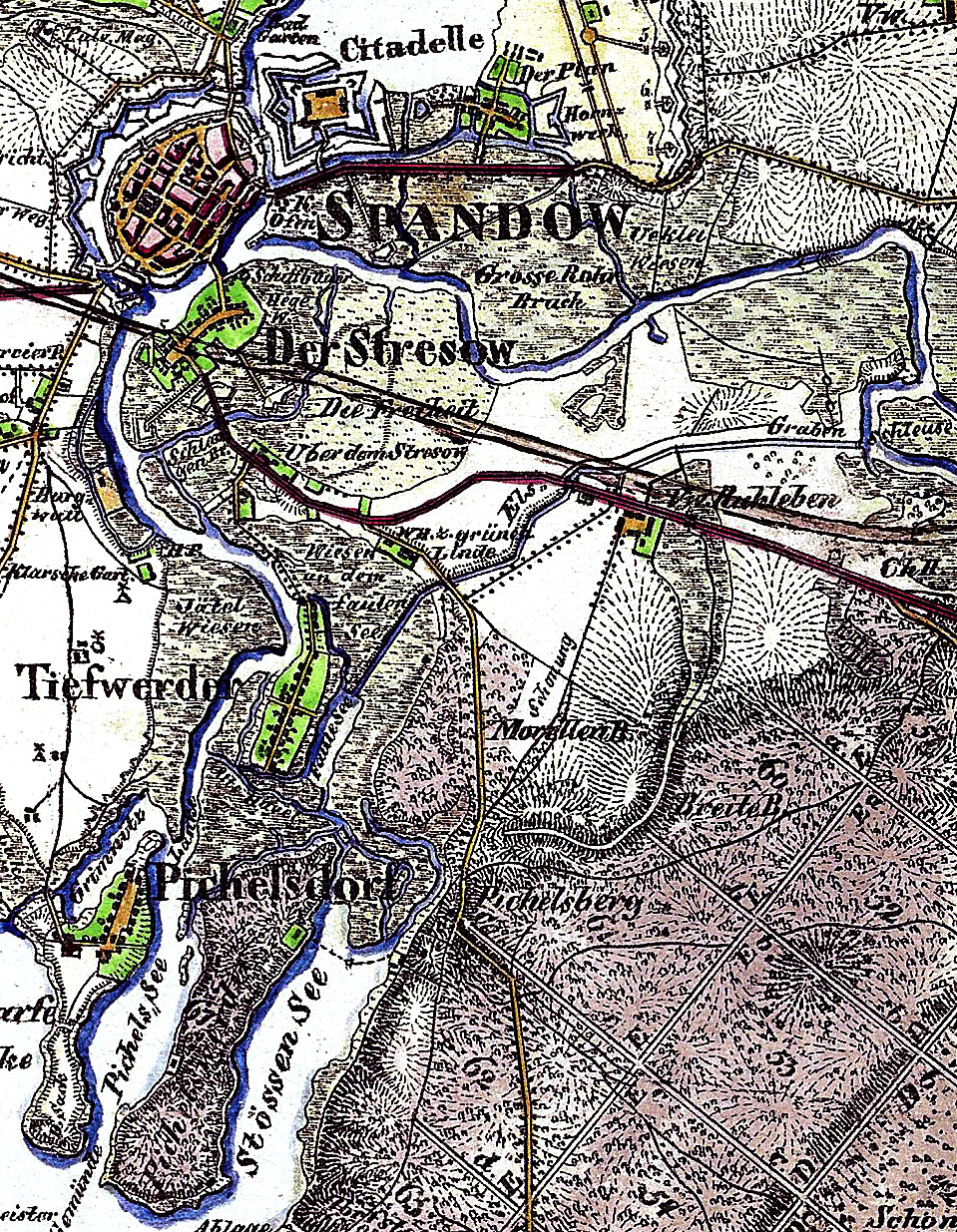
Murellenberge (here still Morellenberge), gorge and forest with the Elsgraben on a map from 1842 (detail)

=== Former northern boundary of Elsgraben ===
Interventions in the northern area of the Schanzenwald forest took place as early as 1840 with the construction of barracks, shooting ranges and the entrenchments that gave the area its name. After the World War II, the area was used by the British occupying forces as a military training ground. Since 2007, it has been open to the public again as a reclaimed recreational area. Part of it was incorporated into the Murellenschlucht und Schanzenwald nature reserve. To the north-east of the former military area is a training area still used by the police today, followed to the north by the Ruhleben Cemetery, which was established in 1952. "The concept of an 'open cemetery' integrated into the surrounding grounds was not realized."

Even before the barracks and redoubts were built, the Elsgraben was created in 1832 and formed the northern boundary of the hill area for a century. The moat connected the (old) Spree opposite the then Otternbucht (approximately at the level of today's Heizkraftwerk Reuter) with the Faulen See in Tiefwerder, which in turn is connected to the Havel via several Havel branches and the Stößensee - still today -. The ditch, which was navigable until 1886, was intended to protect Spandau during floods by channeling the water to the Havel before it reached the town. It was also intended to drainage the surrounding areas and put them to better agricultural use. In collaboration with Borsig, Friedrich Neuhaus had the first German wrought-iron lattice bridge built over the Elsgraben. With the canalization of the Unterspree in the 1880s, the Elsgraben lost its importance and was gradually filled in until around 1930. Today, Hempelsteig and Elsgrabenweg in the Spandau part of Ruhleben roughly follow its course, which is the last reminder of the moat in Berlin's cityscape.

The construction of the Elsgraben had a considerable influence on the water balance of the Murellenberge and the Murellenschlucht. The region drained into the ditch, particularly via the Ruhleben meadow, with the result that the water level of the silting moor sank. The drainage has been interrupted since the Hempelsteig was filled in 1936 with the excavation from the Waldbühne.

=== Integration of the Murellenteich natural monument (north-east) ===
The state of Berlin considers the natural monument to be part of the hilly forest area and includes it in its description of the Murellenschlucht and Schanzenwald nature reserve: "In its extent, the structurally rich mixed deciduous forest, which extends from the Murellenteich to the west over the Murellenschlucht, the Murellenberg and the adjacent Schanzenwald to the north to the police area, is a special feature by Berlin standards." In the Biotop- and Artenschutz, the Senate Department for Urban Development and Environmental Protection lists the pond under the heading "Naturschutzgebiete/Naturdenkmale mit flächenhafter Ausprägung" as type "PfW". Here, "Pf" stands for "Pfuhle und andere Kleingewässer" and "W" for "Arten der Wälder (Wälder/Waldparkanlagen

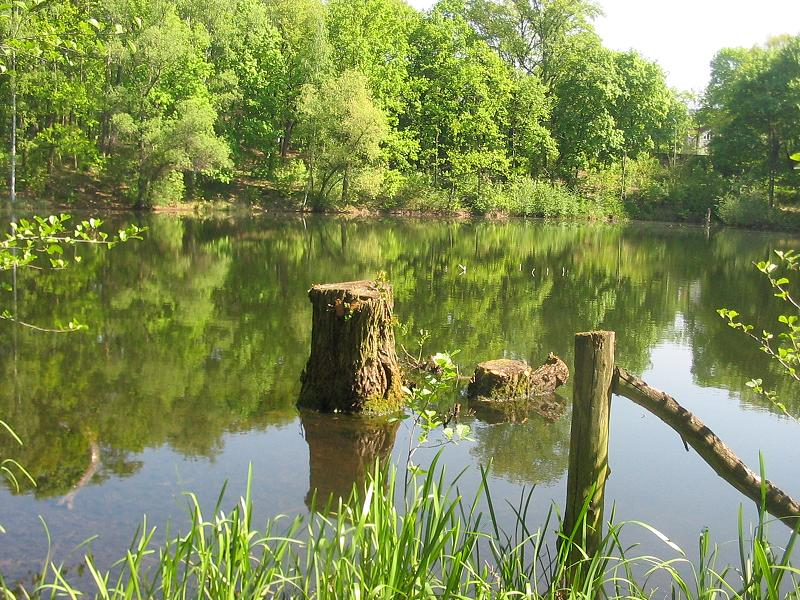
Murellenteich pond near the Ruhleben housing estate

innerhalb siedlungsgeprägter Räume)" The pond, which was much larger at the time, was used as a military bathing facility until 1935 and had a long bathing jetty and a diving tower. The Murellenteich was connected to the Spandauer Bock restaurant through an underpass beneath the Hamburger Stadtbahnanschluss, which developed from a small pub opened in 1840 by the brewer Conrad Bechmann. Opposite, on the north side of Spandauer Damm on the so-called Spandauer Spitze, was Bechmann's brewery, the Spandauer Berg-Brauerei, as well as the second part of the pub, popularly known as Zibbe after the female counterpart of the Bock. One of the attractions of the restaurant, which closed at the end of the 1930s, was the impressive view of the Spree valley. To the east, the magazine publisher Ludwig von Schaeffer-Voit had Carl Schwatlo build the so-called Schloss Ruhwald in 1867/1868 and created a spacious Landschaftspark, today's Ruhwaldpark; in 1952, the classicist villa was demolished.

The steep slope of the Teltow plateau, which is otherwise miles away from the riverbed of the Spree, comes unusually close to the river at this point. This made it possible to place the villa on the edge of the slope, 30 meters above the water and with a magnificent view. As late as 1937, views of the Spree and Havel valleys as far as Lake Tegel were still possible. [...] Its outstanding location can no longer be experienced because all the views have been overgrown.

— Charlottenburg-Wilmersdorf District Office: Ruhwald Park

The closest the Teltownordkante came to the Spree was another 600 meters northeast at a former shooting lodge built in 1818 west of today's Rohrdammbrücke. Located close to the historic mineral water spring of Fürstenbrunn, the Teltow hill in front of it was named Fürstenbrunner Höhe in 1879 and later Spandauer Berg, although it is not entirely certain whether Spandauer Berg included the area of the so-called Spandauer Spitze. In the course of urban development, Spandauer Berg was "regulated", as the Lexikon Berliner Straßen notes.

=== Schanzenwald ===
==== Military and police use ====
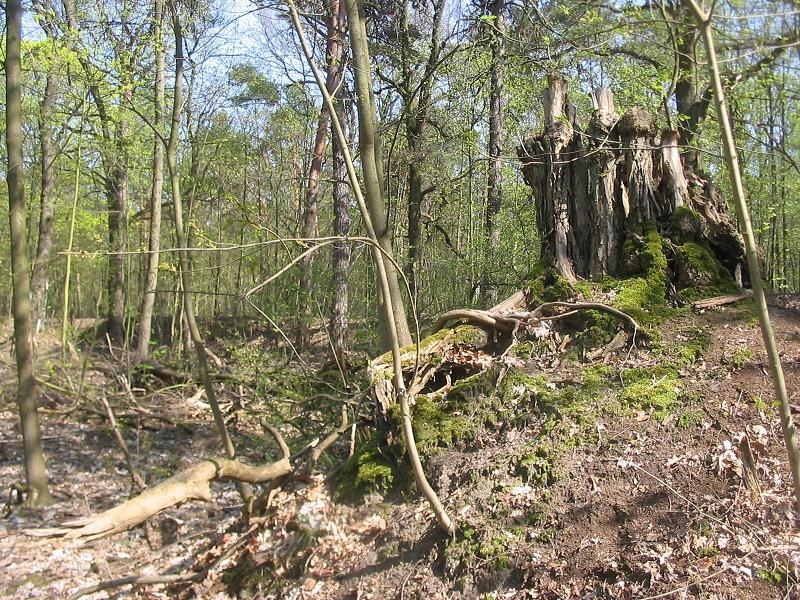
Schanzenwald

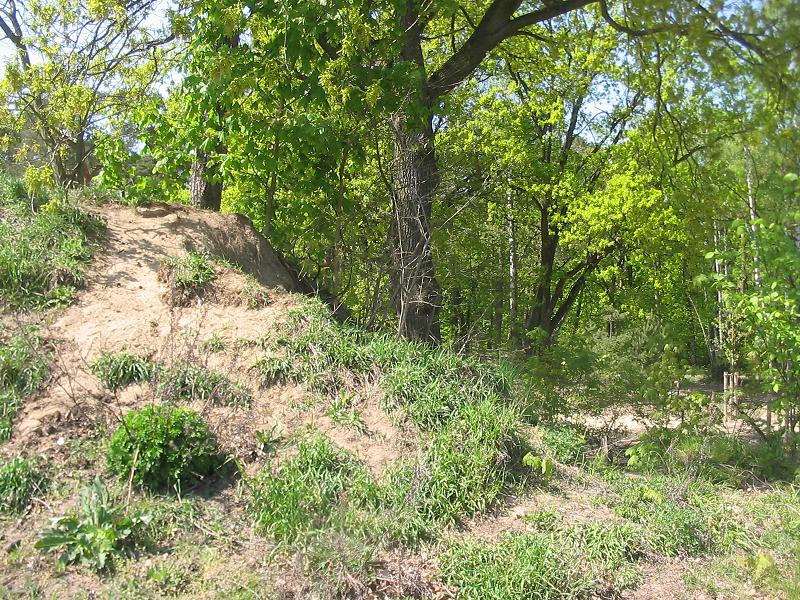
Schanzenwald

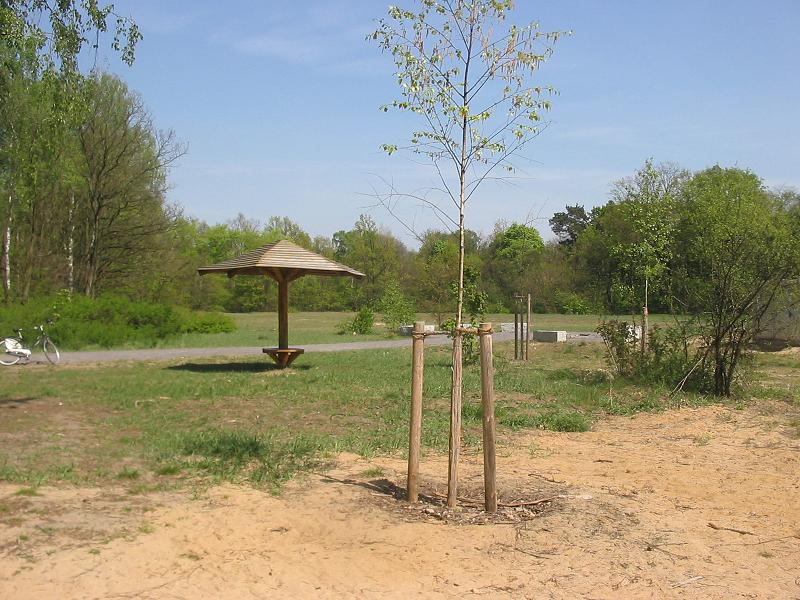
Renaturalized part of the former large shooting meadow

The first military installations at the Murellenberge, at that time still in Spandau territory, with barracks and shooting ranges were built around 1840. In 1855, the Rifle Testing Commission began work on the site, from which the Royal Infantry Shooting School emerged. Ruhleben emerged from. During this time, the Prussian military also built a ring around the Altstadt Spandau and the Zitadelle ramparts and redoubt. In the 1850s, as part of the Stresow fortification, two advanced, outer and stand-alone lunettes were built on the Elsgraben: the Ruhlebener Schanze north of the mouth of the river from the Murellenschlucht into the Elsgraben and the Teltower Schanze or Teltower Brück Schanze, which gave the forest its name, in the north-west corner of today's Schanzenwald. Both redoubts had a two-storey redoubt, which was suitable for both rifle and gun defense. Although this fortification method was outdated by the end of the 19th century at the latest, the Schanzenwald was used as a military and later police training ground and shooting range for around 150 years without interruption. On the Teltower Schanze sports ground (tennis court) at the corner of Havelchaussee and Elsgrabenweg, there is still a denkmalgeschützter (redoubt, ditch, hollow shelter and fortifications) of the reduit building.

After the World War II, the British Allied Forces took over the restricted area, handing it over to the Berlin police in 1994. After tough negotiations, the Senate Departments for the Interior and Urban Development agreed in 2004 to transfer the area to the Berlin Forests. Only a small remaining area in the north with an ammunition depot and the so-called Fighting City, where the British military trained in house-to-house combat (military), remained with the police. "The combat village was built by the British to practise house-to-house combat. Typical urban situations were recreated: small houses, high-rise buildings, a church, supermarket, petrol station, telephone booths, a railroad embankment with a few subway cars on top [...] The exercise could be observed and controlled from a control center via video cameras and loudspeakers." Today, the police train special units such as the SEK or personal protection in Fighting City.

==== Renaturation 2007, replacement measure by Deutsche Bahn ====
In order to renaturalize the training area, "extensive measures were carried out to secure and eliminate danger spots, unseal paths and areas, remove enclosures, restore the landscape and develop and design the area". The Berlin Forestry Administration unsealed and renaturalized an area of 9,400 square meters, including 6,850 m^{2} of paths and squares made of asphalt, concrete and concrete block paving as well as 2,000 m^{2} of solid buildings such as wooden and metal barracks and removed 2,600 meters of fencing, 2,000 m^{2} of shooting ranges and walls as well as 20,800 tons of waste and demolition, 6,500 tons of which were hazardous.

The measure was financed by DB ProjektBau to the tune of around 830,000 euros. The subsidiary of Deutsche Bahn had committed itself to the takeover as a nature conservation replacement measure for the impairments to nature and landscape caused by the construction project for the high-speed line Hanover-Berlin, planning approval section 1E. Accompanying funds from the environmental relief program of the EU (2006) and the State of Berlin amounting to around 760,000 euros and a further 56,000 euros from the Charlottenburg-Wilmersdorf district office for the demolition and disposal of the heavily contaminated materials.

On November 28, 2007, the district's environmental councillor handed over the new recreational area of around 38 hectares to the public, which also received a new network of paths by 2009. DB's replacement measures also included opening up the forest area Am Rupenhorn south of Heerstraße on Stößensee. This measure led to the extension of the Havelhöhenweg to Heerstraße and to its connection to the Murellenschlucht and Schanzenwald nature reserve, so that the connection between the Murellenberge and the Grunewald forest has been restored via a hiking trail.

== Shooting site and memorial ==
In addition to the urban interventions in the natural environment, the execution site of the Nazi military justice system shaped the history of the uninhabited Murellenberge.

=== Execution site of the Nazi military justice system ===
Contrary to other accounts, the shootings most likely did not take place directly in the Murellenschlucht gorge. After a site inspection in 1995 with contemporary witnesses and a topographical analysis, an area near today's ammunition depot or a sand pit in the Schanzenwald forest are more likely to be the location. In the final phase of the Second World War, the Central Court of the Army, the flying Standing Court of the Army and other Courts Martial passed over 230 death sentences, which were carried out at this Wehrmacht firing range V in Berlin, usually without delay. The sentences, against which no appeal was permitted, were mainly for German so-called Wehrkraftzersetzer and Deserteuren of the Wehrmacht. In individual cases, Alsatians of French nationality who had been forcibly recruited into the German Wehrmacht were also affected. File studies revealed that only politically motivated death sentences were among them, as in the case of the professional officer and Resistance fighter of the 20 July 1944 Gustav Heisterman von Ziehlberg. According to previous analyses, 232 people were shot here between August 12, 1944 and April 14, 1945, but a higher number of unreported cases can be assumed. The pastor of the Protestant village church Staaken spoke of over 300 executions in a 1995 speech. 117 of those murdered were buried in the Spandau cemetery In den Kisseln, 81 in English field near Seeburg in graves that are not marked separately.

=== Symbol ===
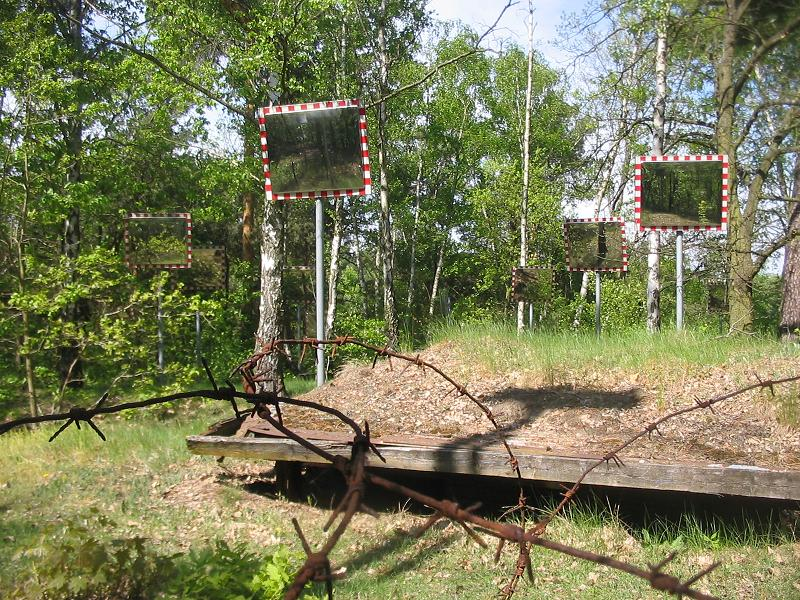
Memorial at the probably authentic execution site on the Murellenbergs

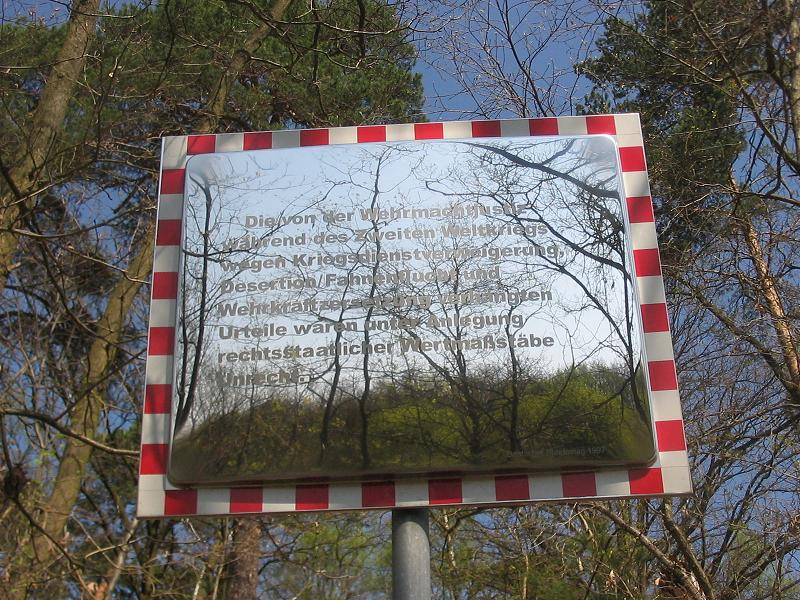
Memorial sign with inscription

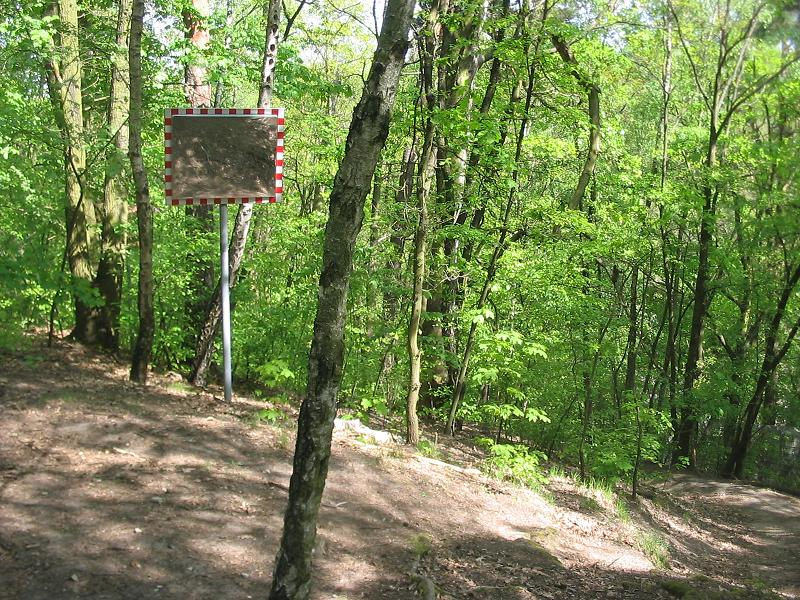
Memorial trail on the Murellenberge

==== Competition and realization ====
After the Berlin bid for the Olympic Summer Games, in which the Olympic village was to be built on the site of the Schanzenwald, the pastor of the district synod Charlottenburg, Manfred Engelbrecht, founded the Murellenschlucht/Olympiagelände working group in 1994 with the aim of creating a memorial site for the victims of Nazi military justice. In 1997, the working group and the Charlottenburg district assembly agreed on a design by the architect and artist Wolfgang Göschel, a member of the Wassertorplatz group of architects. The memorial made of three stylized steel execution stakes was to represent the biographies of three murdered victims. The planned location was the path to the Waldbühne. Here, the memorial was to correspond with the Nazi architecture of the 1936 Olympiabauten. The project failed due to a lack of funds.

In 2000, the Senate Department for Urban Development invited nine artists to take part in a competition for the Memorial to the Murdered of the Nazi Military Justice on the Murellenberg. In 2001, the jury decided in favor of the design by the Argentinian artist Patricia Pisani, who lives in Berlin. Starting from Glockenturmstraße, Patricia Pisani erected 104 traffic mirrors along the forest path, the number of which is condensed towards the probably authentic shooting site at the ammunition depot.

The installation of these familiar road traffic objects arouses attention and curiosity in the unfamiliar surroundings of the forest. On a symbolic level, they refer to a danger and warn: Be careful here! Engraved texts on selected mirrors build a bridge to the historical events and establish references to the present. The texts are visually overlaid with reflections of passers-by, the forest and the authentic shooting site.

— Senate Department for Urban Development: Competition "Memorial to the Murdered of the Nazi Military Justice at Murellenberg" in Berlin-Charlottenburg decided.

One of the reasons Patricia Pisani gave for choosing traffic mirrors as an art object was that traffic mirrors show "what is happening around the corner, a danger or a threat that may be approaching at a blind spot but is not yet visible. They show something that is not visible from the current location: around the corner, into the past, into the future." The 15 mirrors with laser engraved The 15 mirrors with laser-engraved texts refer to the history, the place, the Nazi judgments and laws and gain an increasingly personal level towards the site of the events with quotes from direct experiences of contemporary witnesses, including:

A verdict was read out and came to me in fragments The corporal [...] years old [...] for desertion [...] to death [...], the petty officer [...] years old [...] sentenced [...] for cowardice before the enemy [...] to death by firing squad [...]

— Memorial sign on the Murellenberg, text of a mirror, contemporary witness, 1994

At the inauguration of the installation on May 8, 2002, Ludwig Baumann, Wehrmacht deserter and chairman of the Federal Association of Victims of National Socialist Military Justice, introduced his speech with a quote from Hitler: "The soldier can die, the deserter must die."

==== Criticism: Second-class commemoration ====
In his inauguration speech for the memorial, Ludwig Baumann criticized the fact that commemoration at the authentic site was not possible. Baumann pointed out that the location at the ammunition depot was still part of the fenced-in police area. However, the site was visible from the memorial path, as it was located in the extreme south-eastern corner of the training area close to the fence. Initiatives to make the site accessible were initially thwarted by the Senate Department of the Interior. Lothar Eberhardt, who has been a critical observer of Nazi remembrance work for years, describes the memorial as second-class remembrance. Instead of Wolfgang Göschel's design being realized on the path to the Waldbühne, which was clearly visible to many, the Senate opted for memorials that were "hidden in the forest". In response to this criticism, there is another traffic mirror in the Urban space at the former Reichskriegsgericht building and refers to the memorial sign on the Murellenberg. In the meantime, the entire area of the former ammunition depot up to the fence of the Fighting City has been completely cleared, renaturalized and opened to the public. The previously inaccessible Wehrmacht firing range is now accessible to everyone. From the Schanzenwald forest via the southern part of the Große Schießwiese, the area has also been made accessible by an additional path from this side.

== Nature conservation, flora and fauna ==
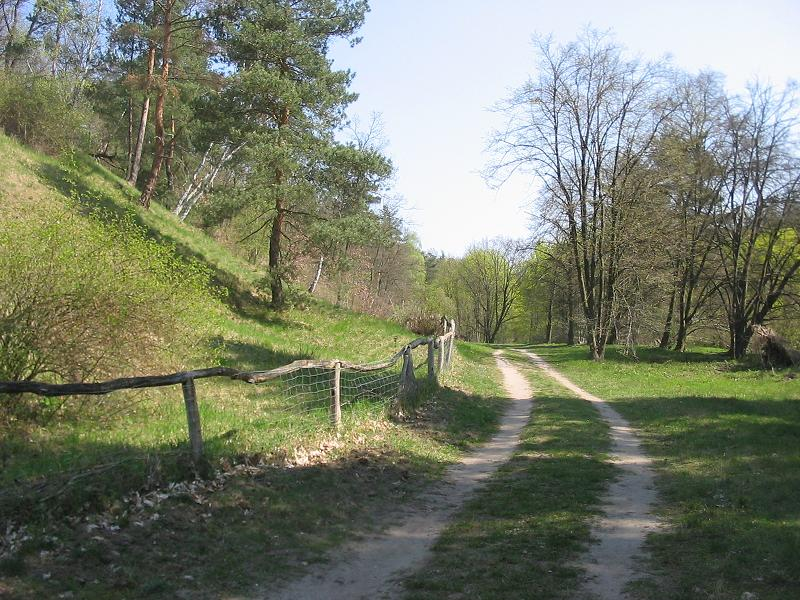
Southern slope of the Murellen Gorge

=== Murellen Gorge and Schanzenwald nature reserve ===
On January 26, 1968, the state of Berlin declared the core of the area a natural monument and on March 10, 1993, it was declared Berlin nature reserve no. 18 under the name Murellenschlucht und Schanzenwald with 28.5 hectares under protection. In § 3, the Ordinance on the Murellenschlucht and Schanzenwald nature reserve in the Charlottenburg

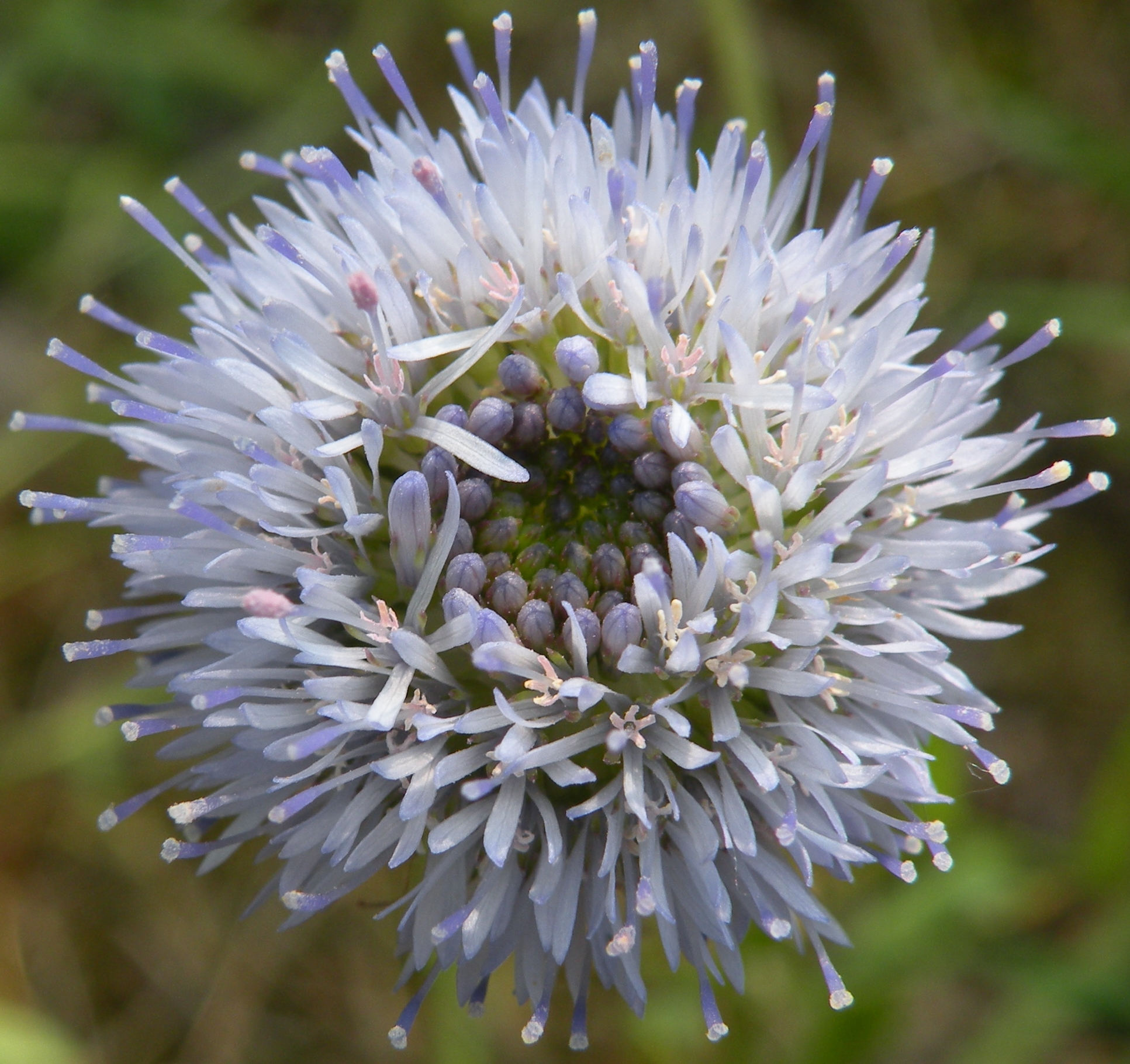
Endangered mountain sandbell, flower of the year 1990

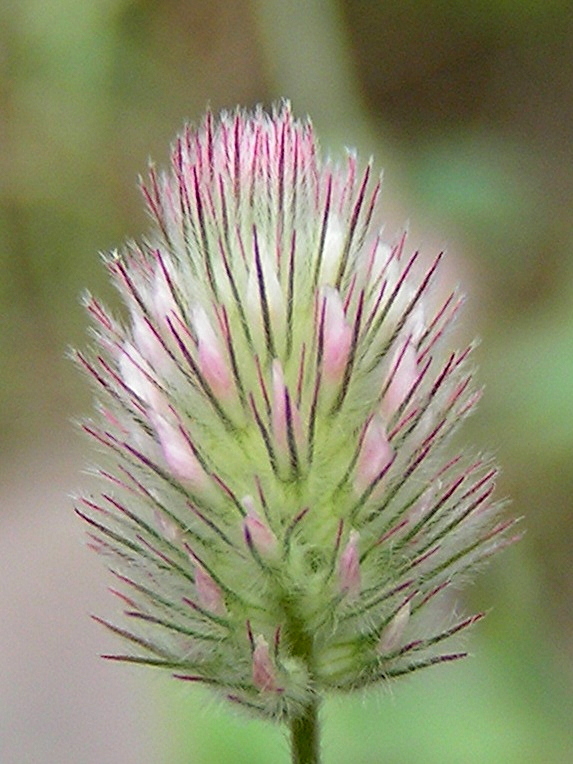
Hasen-Klee

district of Berlin lists the purpose of protection:

The area designated in § 2 is protected in order to

1. the communities

a) the Murellen Gorge as a dry and warm habitat that has become very rare in Berlin
b) of the adjacent pine and oak forest of the Murellenberg and the Schanzenwald;

2. to secure the long-term existence of animal species threatened with extinction and

3. to preserve the area because of its diversity and special character.

— Ordinance on the Murellenschlucht and Schanzenwald nature reserve in the Charlottenburg district of Berlin dated March 10, 1993

=== Flora ===
Dry grasslands with mixed fringe and shrub flora not only dominate the south-facing slope areas of the gorge, but also interrupt the landscape in the Murellenberge and the Schanzenwald, especially on the former Große Schießwiese. The occurrence of the sand immortelle is remarkable. The golden or lemon-yellow flowering member of the composite flower family is considered endangered and is specially protected under the Federal Species Protection Ordinance (BArtSchV) and is specially protected. Pungent stonecrop, lesser hawkweed, rush knapweed and common pigweed provide further yellow accents. The flowers of the mountain sandbell, which prefers dry sandy nutrient-poor grassland or limestone-poor rocky areas and was voted Flower of the Year in 1990 due to its endangerment, stand out in light blue. Shades of red and pink complement little sorrel, hare's clover, common carnation and red ostrich grass as well as rough-leaved fescue. Sheep's fescue and the pioneer plant silver grass complete the family of sweet grasses on the dry, warm sites.

The ramparts of the former shooting ranges structure the redoubt forest, in which biotope qualities have been able to develop relatively undisturbed due to over 150 years of enclosure. Pine and oak stands, some specimens around 300 years old, characterize the forest and the forest areas of the Murellenberge. Sparse English oaks and birchs provide a more open feel. Also noteworthy are some very old common weeping cherrys and the old oak avenue of the former post road. Common robinia crown the crests of some of the mounds. The age structure is very mixed and the stands are characterized by a strong horizontal layering (herb, shrub, tree layer). "This clearly distinguishes this area from the tree stands of the Grunewald, which were predominantly afforested and are so-called age-class stands. The diversity of habitats for native fauna is significantly lower there, as is the number of species." There is also a high proportion of deadwood, which is of great importance for biocoenoses in the bark, in the wood, in tree hollows and in special structures such as sap flows or burns. Many insect species, such as ants, hymenoptera and butterflies find their habitat niche here. The majority of wasp and bee species depend on the decay and decomposition phases of old and dead wood.

=== Fauna ===
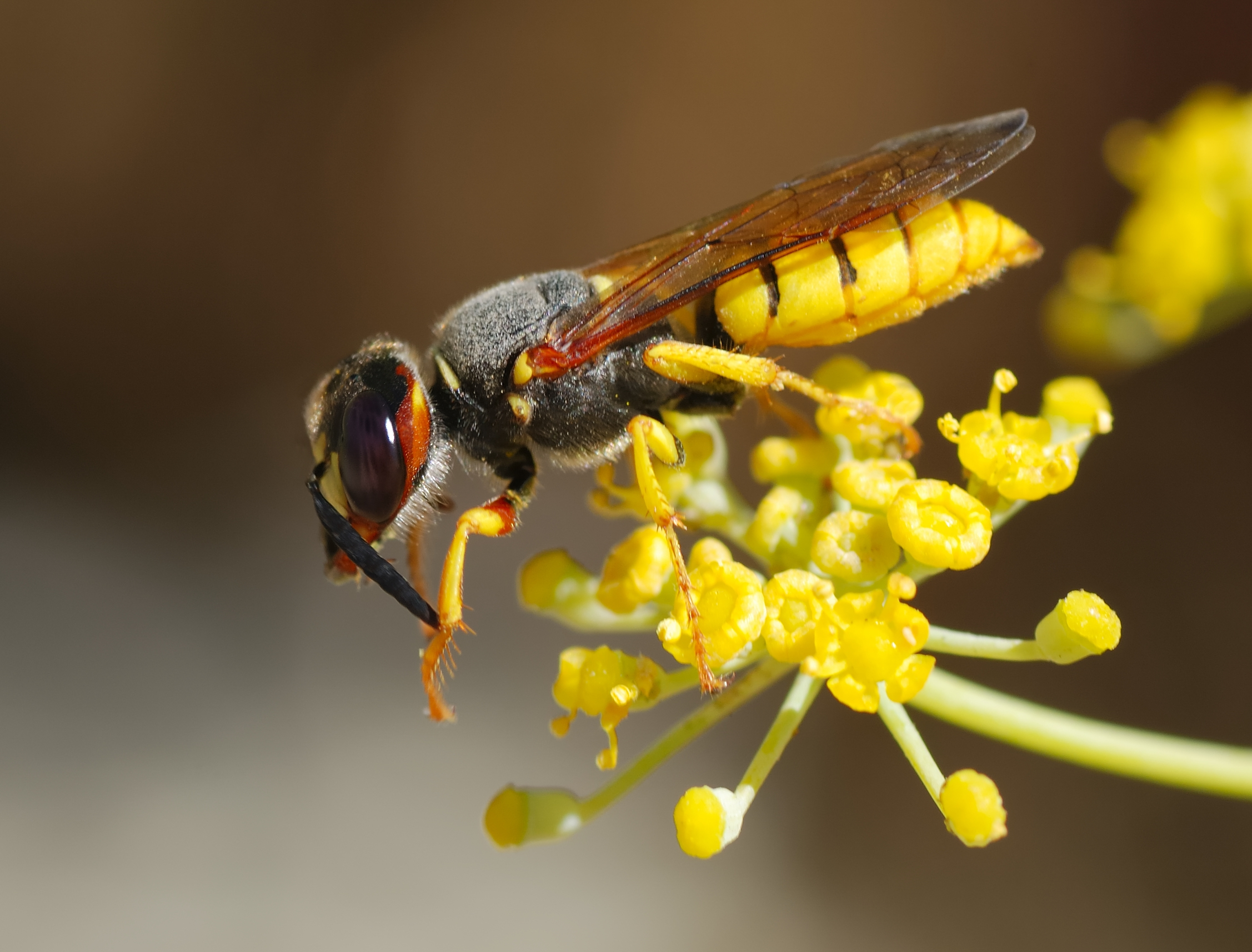
Beewolf (digger wasp)

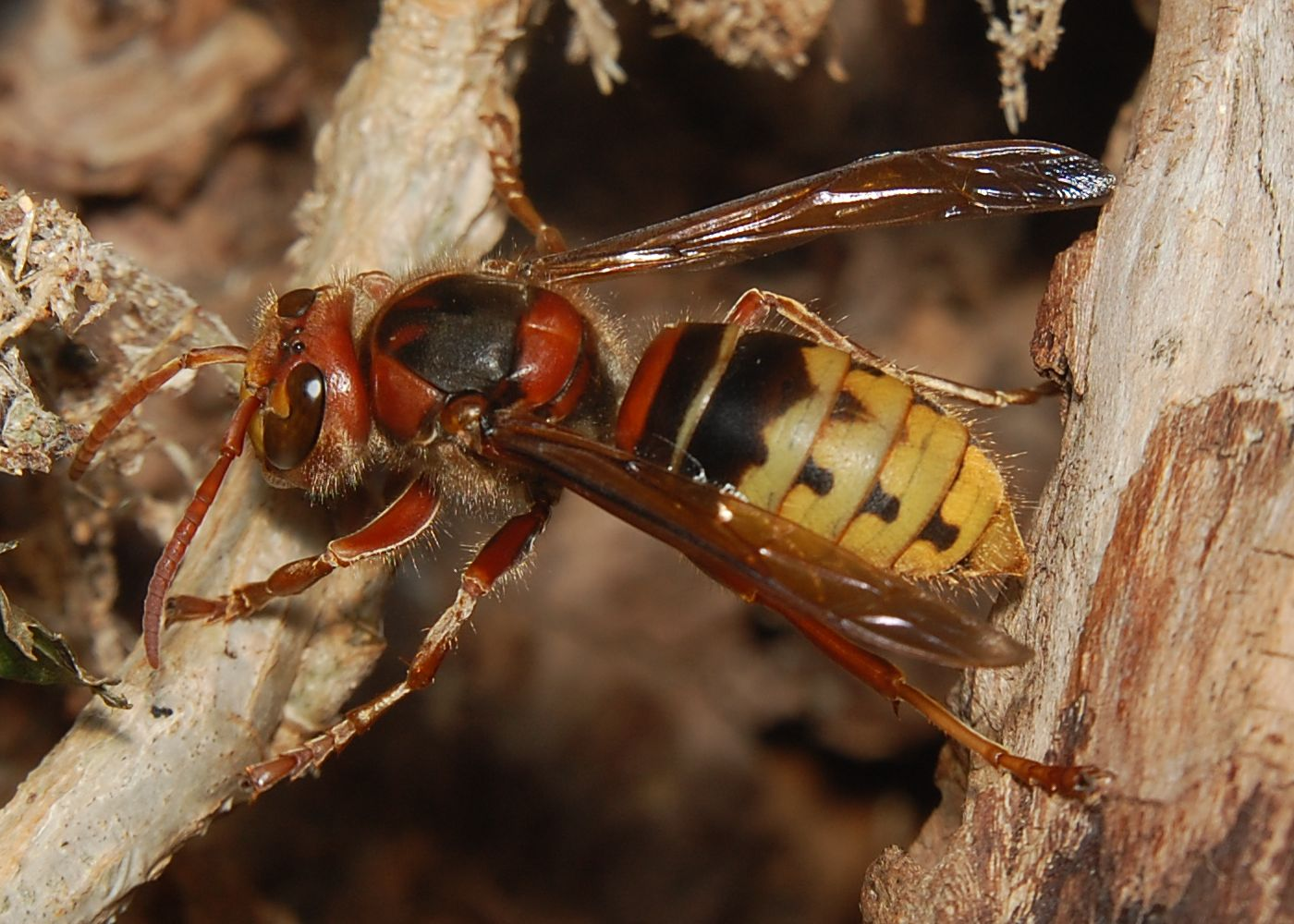
Hornet

Inventory studies of the Zoological Institute at the Free University of Berlin revealed that 97 different flying insect species, 57 of which are rare or endangered, and eleven rare butterfly species are native to the structurally rich biotope. Hymenoptera in particular, which build their nests in the ground and are dependent on dry, warm locations, find ideal conditions here. These include digger wasps such as the beewolf, which catches honeybees as food for its larvas and immobilizes them with a sting using a fast-acting venom. Other cuckoo wasps and also social parasites such as cuckoo bumblebees, which have their young raised by other bumblebees, live in the area. There are also cuckoo bee species such as wasp bees or blood bees, as well as silk bees, furrow bees and recluse bees such as cone bees. All wild bees and bumblebees are protected under the BArtSchV. There are various wasps from the family of stinging wasps, including the German wasp, Saxon wasp and common wasp and the unjustly feared hornet, which is specially protected under the BArtSchV, although it is not on the Red List in Berlin as endangered. Arachnids and beetles are represented in large numbers. It is noteworthy that the Brandenburg Red List lists a now extinct/vanished water beetle that was recorded at the Elsgraben in 1921: the hook beetle Dryops smilaris Bollow, a typical inhabitant of running water.

The old-growth forests are also used by cavity-nesting birds for their nests. A total of 65 bird species are native to the area. The forest is dominated by songbirds and the occasional knocking of a great spotted woodpecker can be heard. In 1999, ornithologists discovered a breeding pair of Common Rail at the Murellenteich pond, which is on the Red List in the early warning stage (as of 2006). From the class of reptiles, the slow worm and the sand lizard are represented. Furthermore, wild boars, roe deers, red foxes and small mammals such as the wood shrew colonize the Murellenberge, the Murellenschlucht and the Schanzenwald.

=== Maintenance measures ===
In order to preserve the geomorphologically exceptional natural area in Berlin and its biotopes, the state of Berlin carries out various maintenance measures. These include regular mowing, the removal of mowed material and keeping wood growth free to preserve the dry, warm and nutrient-poor sites. In the forest, the robinia is to be pushed back, which, as a problematic neophyte, threatens the biodiversity of biotope types such as nutrient-poor grassland, dry calcareous grassland and dry sandy grassland. The high proportion of deadwood should be preserved and the south-facing slopes should be kept free of shading shrubs. Otherwise, the responsible Senate Department for Urban Development wants to leave the area to its own devices as far as possible and limit measures to traffic safety and maintenance of the path network.

== Outlook: Concept of an elevated path on the Teltownord ridge ==
The connection between the Murellenberge and the northern band of the Teltow is barely perceptible in today's cityscape due to urban development, the overbuilding of roads, railroad lines, U-Bahn lines and settlements. In order to make the unity of the landscape tangible again, the Senate Department for Urban Development proposed a Höhenweg on the Teltownordkante in 2004 in a Planwerk Westraum Berlin, which would connect the Murellenberge with Charlottenburg Palace Park via the Murellenteich. The path is also intended to make the "recreational and adventure area river landscape and allotment park in Spreetal" accessible. The concept also envisages creating a viewpoint over the Spree valley along the way. Since Charlottenburg Palace is already connected to Großer Tiergarten and thus to City West and Ost via paths along the Spree, the realization of the proposal would result in a continuous Havel and Spree path from Strandbad Wannsee via the Havelhöhenweg and the Murellenberge to the city centre. Via the Bullengraben green corridor, the Tiefwerder Wiesen and Pichelswerder or via the Stößensee, the Höhenweg would also create a green link from the center of Berlin to Spandau.

== Literature ==
- Biotoptypen- und FFH-Lebenraumtypenkartierung für das NSG Murellenschlucht und Schanzenwald, NSG Fließwiese Ruhleben und angrenzende Bereiche. Commissioned by: Senate Department for Urban Development, Planland (Landscape Development Planning Group), Berlin 2006.
- Naturschutzgebiet Murellenschlucht und Schanzenwald. In: Senate Department for Urban Development Berlin: natürlich Berlin! Naturschutz- und NATURA 2000-Gebiete in Berlin. Verlag Natur & Text, Berlin 2007, ISBN 978-3-9810058-3-7, p. 120–123.
- Pflege- und Entwicklungsplan für die Naturschutzgebiete „Murellenschlucht und Schanzenwald" und „Fließwiese Ruhleben". Commissioned by: Senate Department for Urban Development, Planland (Landscape Development Planning Group), Berlin 2007.
- Planwerk Westraum Berlin. Ziele, Strategien und landschaftsplanerisches Leitbild. (PDF; 1,4 MB) Edited by: Senate Department for Urban Development, Kulturbuchverlag, Berlin 2004, ISBN 3-88961-185-0.
