= Berlin Olympiastadion station =

Railway station in Berlin, Germany

Coordinates: 52.5117°N 13.2424°E

Olympiastadion
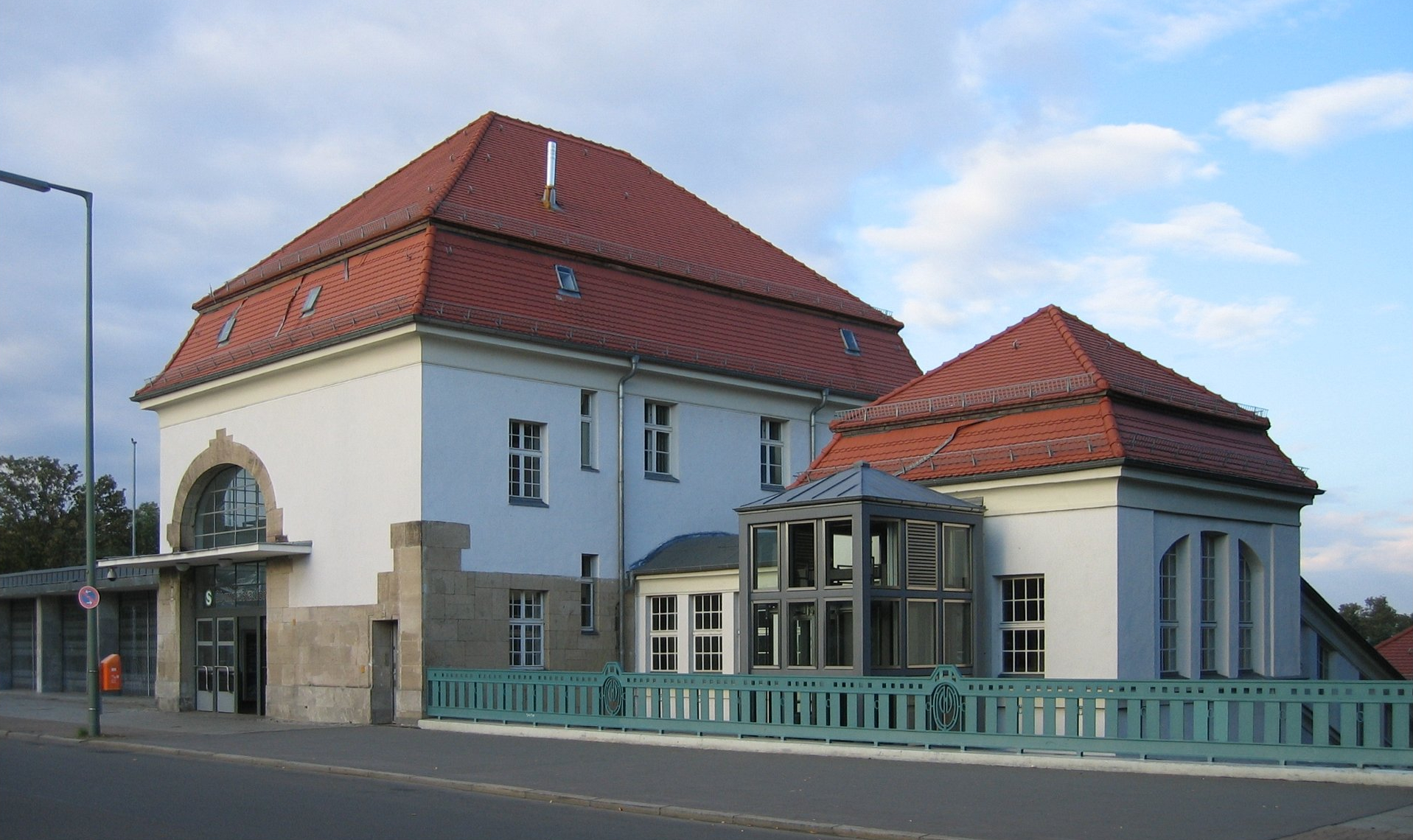

General information
- Location: Charlottenburg-Wilmersdorf, Berlin, Berlin; Germany
- Owner: Deutsche Bahn
- Operator: DB Netz; DB Station&Service
- Connections: S3 S9

Other information
- Station code: 7731
- DS100 code: BOLS
- Category: 4
- Fare zone: : Berlin B/5656

History
- Opened: 23 May 1909; 117 years ago
- Closed: 1945, 27 April to 9 June; 19 September 1980 to 16 January 1998; 28 years ago
- Rebuilt: 1935/1936
- Electrified: 23 August 1928; 98 years ago
- Former names: 1909-1930: Rennbahn; 1930-1935: Stadion – Rennbahn Grunewald; 1935-1960: Reichssportfeld

Services
Preceding station	Berlin S-Bahn	Following station
Pichelsberg towards Spandau	S3	Heerstraße towards Erkner
Pichelsberg towards Spandau	S9	Heerstraße towards BER Airport
Location

Olympiastadion is a railway station in the Westend district of Berlin. Located at the southern entrance of the Olympic Stadium, it is served by the S-Bahn lines S3 and S9. The station consists of one island platform which is in regular use, as well as four further terminal island platforms which are only used for the extra trains during major events.

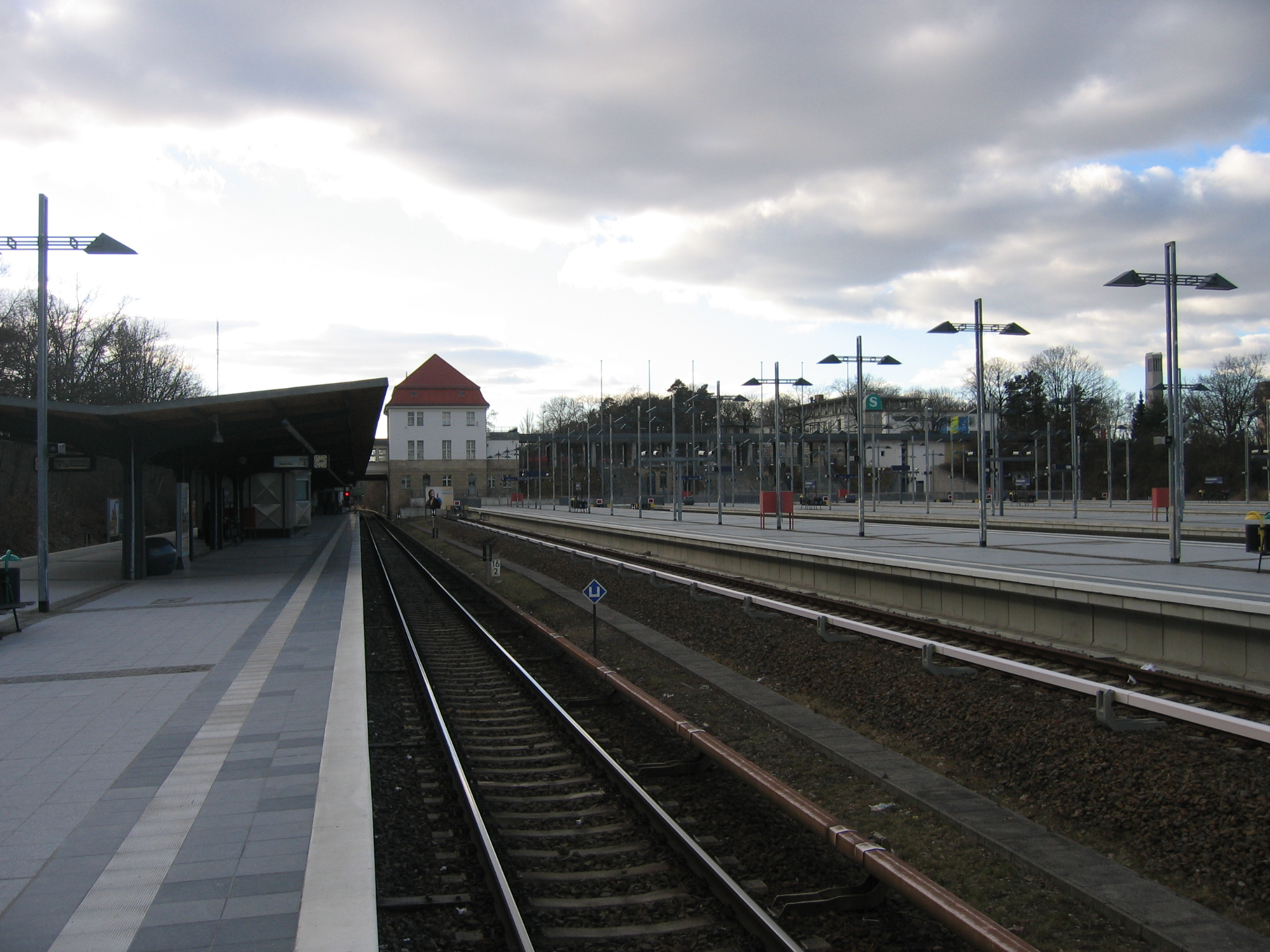
Olympiastadion station: platforms

The station opened in 1909 on the Westbahn suburban railway north of the Grunewald forest. It was then called Rennbahn after a horse racing circuit at the site of the today's stadium. Like the nearby U-Bahn station it received the name Stadion in 1913, when the Deutsches Stadion, projected for the 1916 Summer Olympics, was inaugurated. After Berlin was awarded the 1936 Summer Olympics the station was again renamed Reichssportfeld until it got its actual designation in 1960, spelled without a hyphen in contrast to the Olympia-Stadion U-Bahn station. Adjacent to the south is the Berlin Unité d'Habitation, erected in 1958 according to plans by Le Corbusier. The station was closed in 1980, following the boycott by West Berliners on the East German-run S-Bahn, and the 1980 Deutsche Reichsbahn strike, taking away almost all traffic from the terminus. Most of the West Berlin portion of the S-Bahn, including Olympiastadion, was closed until 1998. The station re-opened in 1999.

For the reconstruction, large parts of the facility were demolished and rebuilt, including all platforms and the pedestrian bridge to Trakehner Allee. The special platform F was abandoned. On January 16, 1998, with the reopening of the Westkreuz–Spandau section, the suburban platform A and the special platform B, now with two platform edges each, went into operation. The remaining three island platforms followed on the occasion of the 75th anniversary of the S-Bahn's launch, on May 29, 1999. Since then, the event station has had a capacity of 40,000 passengers per hour. A sold-out Olympiastadion can therefore be “emptied” in less than two hours.
