= Berlin-Pichelsberg railway station =

Railway station in Berlin, Germany

Coordinates: 52.5102°N 13.2274°E

Pichelsberg
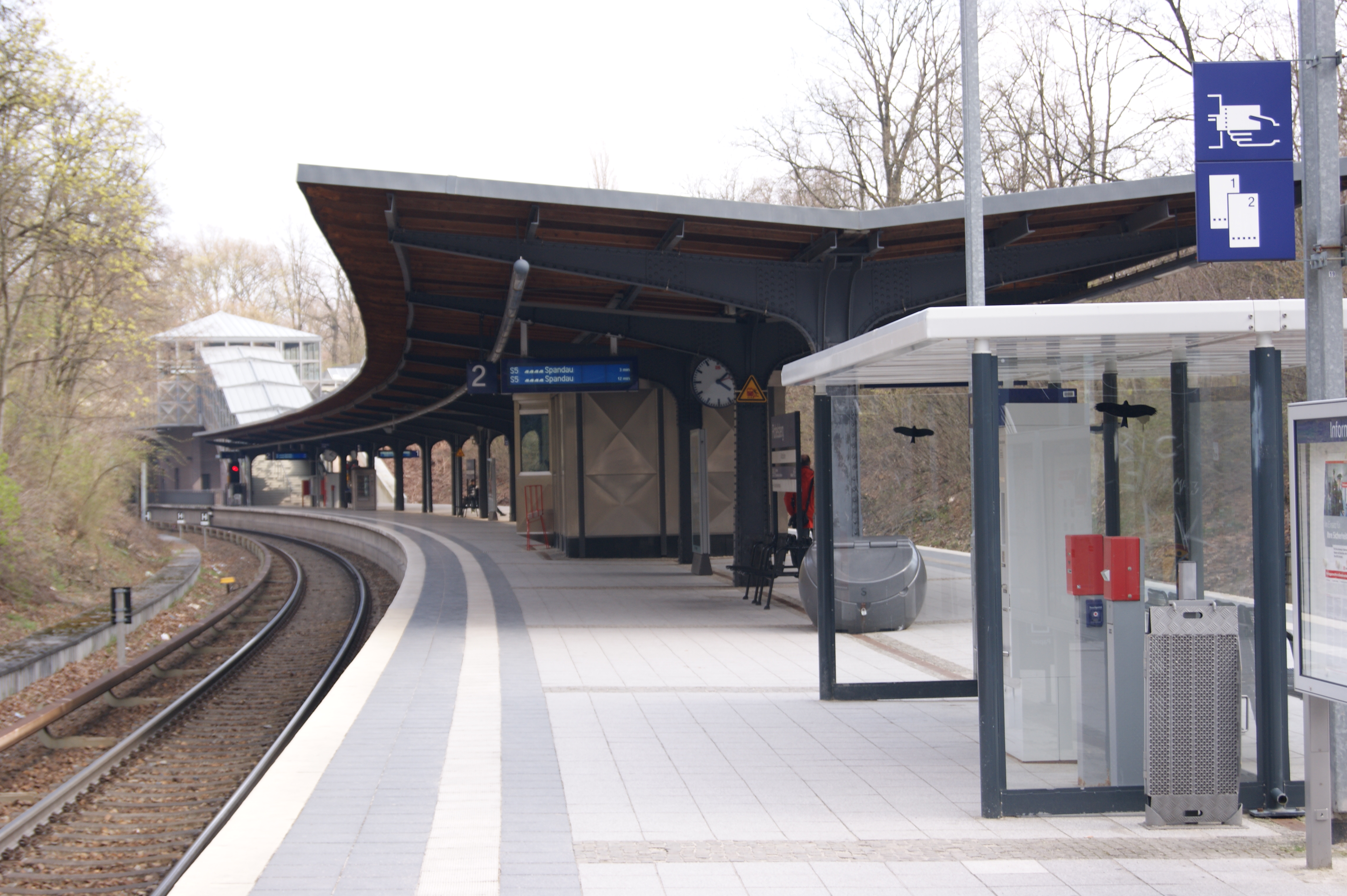

General information
- Location: Charlottenburg-Wilmersdorf, Berlin, Berlin; Germany

Other information
- Station code: 7732
- DS100 code: BPIC
- Category: 4
- Fare zone: : Berlin B/5656

Services
Preceding station	Berlin S-Bahn	Following station
Stresow towards Spandau	S3	Olympiastadion towards Erkner
Stresow towards Spandau	S9	Olympiastadion towards BER Airport
Location

Berlin Pichelsberg is a railway station in the Westend district of Berlin. It is served by the S-Bahn lines S3 and S9.
