= S9 (Berlin) =

Train line of the Berlin S-Bahn

Overview
- Locale: Berlin

Service
- System: Berlin S-Bahn
- Operator(s): S-Bahn Berlin GmbH
- Rolling stock: DBAG Class 481

Technical
- Electrification: 750 V DC Third rail

S9 is a line on the Berlin S-Bahn. It operates from Flughafen BER to Spandau through Berlin Hauptbahnhof (Berlin Central Station) over:

- a very short section of the Outer ring, opened in 1951 and electrified in 1983,
- a short section of the former Outer freight ring opened in the early 1940s and electrified in 1983,
- the Görlitz line, opened in 1866 and electrified in 1929,
- the Ring line, completed in 1877 and electrified in 1926 and, via a connecting curve,
- the Berlin–Wrocław railway, which at Berlin Ostbahnhof becomes
- the Berlin Stadtbahn to Charlottenburg,
- the Spandau Suburban Line.

== Service history ==
The S9 was created on 2 June 1991, replacing the Blue route of the S3 between Charlottenburg and Flughafen Berlin Schönefeld (now Schönefeld (bei Berlin) station), with the western terminus extended by one stop to Westkreuz.
