= Berlin Zoologischer Garten station =

Railway station in Berlin

Berlin Zoologischer Garten
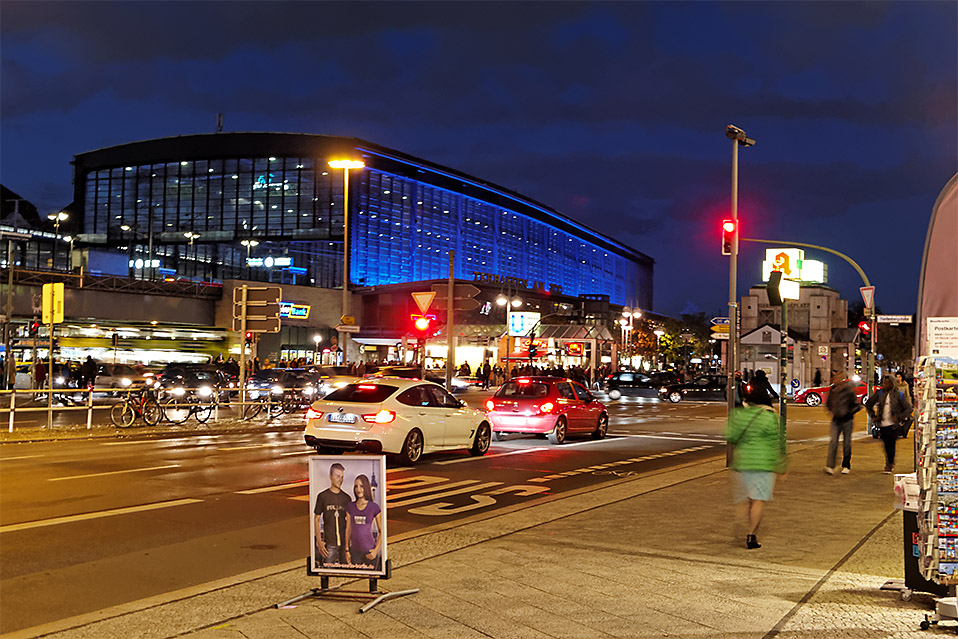

General information
- Location: Hardenbergplatz; 10623 Berlin; Charlottenburg-Wilmersdorf, Berlin, Berlin; Germany
- Coordinates: 52°30′26″N 13°19′57″E
- Owner: Deutsche Bahn
- Operator: DB Station&Service
- Line: Berlin Stadtbahn
- Platforms: 3 island platforms (Stadtbahn); 2 side platforms (U2); 1 island platform (U9)
- Tracks: 6 (Stadtbahn); 4 (U-Bahn, 2 on each level)
- Connections: : 100, 110, 200, 204, 245, 249, X10, X34, N1, N2, N9, N10, N26; : M29, M45, M46, M49

Construction
- Structure type: Elevated (S-Bahn, RE, RB); Underground (U-Bahn)
- Accessible: Yes

Other information
- Station code: 0533
- DS100 code: BZOO
- Category: 2
- Fare zone: : Berlin A/5555
- Website: www.bahnhof.de

History
- Opened: 7 February 1882

Passengers
- 100,000 per day
Services
Preceding station	DB Fernverkehr	Following station
Berlin-Spandau towards Bonn Hbf	ICE 9 Sprinter	Berlin Hbf towards Berlin Ostbahnhof
Berlin-Spandau towards Köln Hbf	ICE 10	Berlin Hbf towards Berlin Ostbahnhof
Berlin-Wannsee towards Köln Hbf	ICE 10	Berlin Hbf towards Berlin Ostbahnhof
Berlin-Spandau towards Chur or Interlaken Ost	ICE 12	Berlin Hbf towards Berlin Ostbahnhof
Berlin-Spandau One-way operation	ICE 13	Berlin Hbf towards Berlin Ostbahnhof
Berlin-Spandau One-way operation	ICE 14	Berlin Hbf towards Berlin Ostbahnhof
Berlin-Spandau towards Köln Hbf	ICE 19	Berlin Hbf towards Berlin Ostbahnhof
Berlin-Wannsee towards Norddeich Mole	IC 56	Berlin Hbf towards Cottbus Hbf
Preceding station	DB Regio Nordost	Following station
Berlin-Charlottenburg towards Dessau Hbf	RE 7	Berlin Hbf towards Senftenberg
Berlin-Charlottenburg towards Nauen	RB 14	Berlin Hbf towards Berlin Ostbahnhof
Berlin-Charlottenburg towards Golm	RB 23	Berlin Hbf towards BER Airport
Berlin-Charlottenburg Terminus	Flughafen-Express	Berlin Hbf towards BER Airport
Preceding station	Ostdeutsche Eisenbahn	Following station
Berlin-Charlottenburg towards Brandenburg Hbf or Magdeburg Hbf	RE 1	Berlin Hbf towards Cottbus Hbf or Frankfurt (Oder)
Berlin-Spandau towards Nauen	RE 2	Berlin Hbf towards Cottbus Hbf
Preceding station	Abellio Rail Mitteldeutschland	Following station
Berlin-Wannsee towards Goslar or Thale Hbf	Harz-Berlin-Express	Terminus
Preceding station	European Sleeper	Following station
Deventer One-way operation	Brussels - Prague	Berlin Ostbahnhof towards Prague
Preceding station	Berlin S-Bahn	Following station
Savignyplatz towards Spandau	S3	Tiergarten towards Erkner
Savignyplatz towards Westkreuz	S5	Tiergarten towards Strausberg Nord
Savignyplatz towards Potsdam Hbf	S7	Tiergarten towards Ahrensfelde
Savignyplatz towards Spandau	S9	Tiergarten towards BER Airport
Preceding station	Berlin U-Bahn	Following station
Ernst-Reuter-Platz towards Ruhleben	U2	Wittenbergplatz towards Pankow
Kurfürstendamm towards Rathaus Steglitz	U9	Hansaplatz towards Osloer Straße
Terminus	U9	Berlin Hbf towards Osloer Straße
Route map
U2 station
U9 station
S-Bahn station
Location

Berlin Zoologischer Garten station (German: Bahnhof Berlin Zoologischer Garten, colloquially Bahnhof Zoo, German: [ˈbaːnˌhoːf ˈt͡soː]) is a railway station in Berlin, Germany. It is located on the Berlin Stadtbahn railway line in the Charlottenburg district, adjacent to the Berlin Zoo.

During the division of the city, the station was the central transport facility of West Berlin, and thereafter for the western central area of reunified Berlin until the opening of Berlin Hauptbahnhof in 2006. It is also an interchange with the U-Bahn and the S-Bahn, which uses the Stadtbahn viaduct along with RegionalExpress and RegionalBahn trains. This station is open 24/7.

== Overview ==
The station building overlooks the Hardenbergplatz square, Berlin's largest city bus terminal and night bus service centre, named after Prussian prime minister Karl August von Hardenberg (1750–1822). It is also used by long-distance buses/coaches; however, Berlin's central intercity bus terminal, the Zentraler Omnibusbahnhof Berlin (ZOB), is located on Messedamm in Westend, not far from the Funkturm.

Zoologischer Garten is also a Berlin U-Bahn station and S-Bahn station, serving U-Bahn lines U2 and U9, and S-Bahn lines S3, S5, S7, and S9.

== History ==
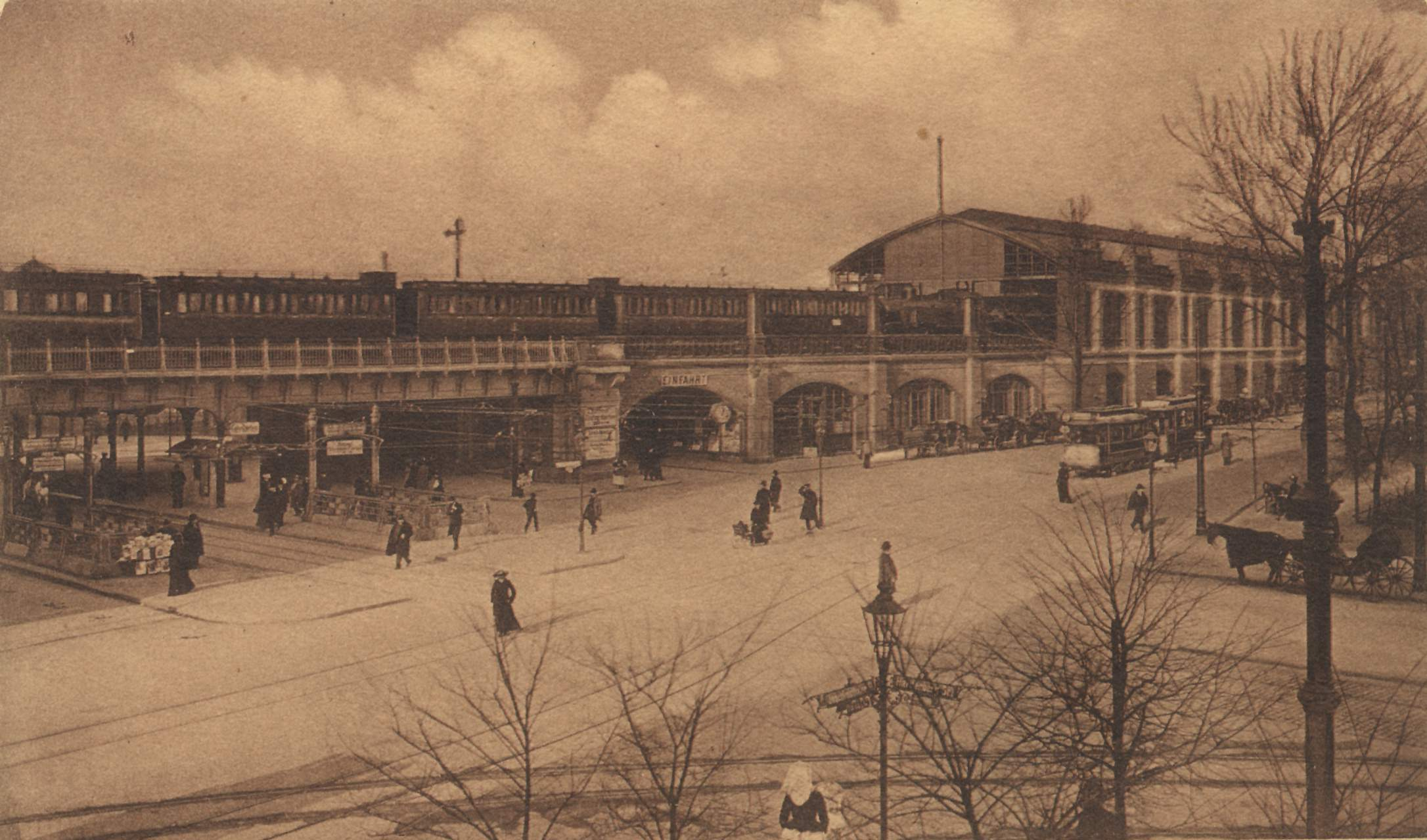
Bahnhof Zoo about 1900

The original station, served by Berlin Stadtbahn commuter trains, opened on 7 February 1882. On 11 March 1902, the first Berlin U-Bahn line, today the U2, was opened underground. With a view to the 1936 Summer Olympics, the station was rebuilt and expanded between 1934 and 1940.

On the night of 23 and 24 November 1943, the track area was directly hit by bombs, and further damage accumulated during the Battle of Berlin.

After the final closure of the Anhalter Bahnhof in 1952, Bahnhof Zoo remained the only long-distance railway station operated by the Deutsche Reichsbahn of East Germany within West Berlin. On 28 August 1961, two weeks after the erection of the Berlin Wall, the new U-Bahn line U9 was opened below the U2, connecting the station with the transport network in the north-south direction.

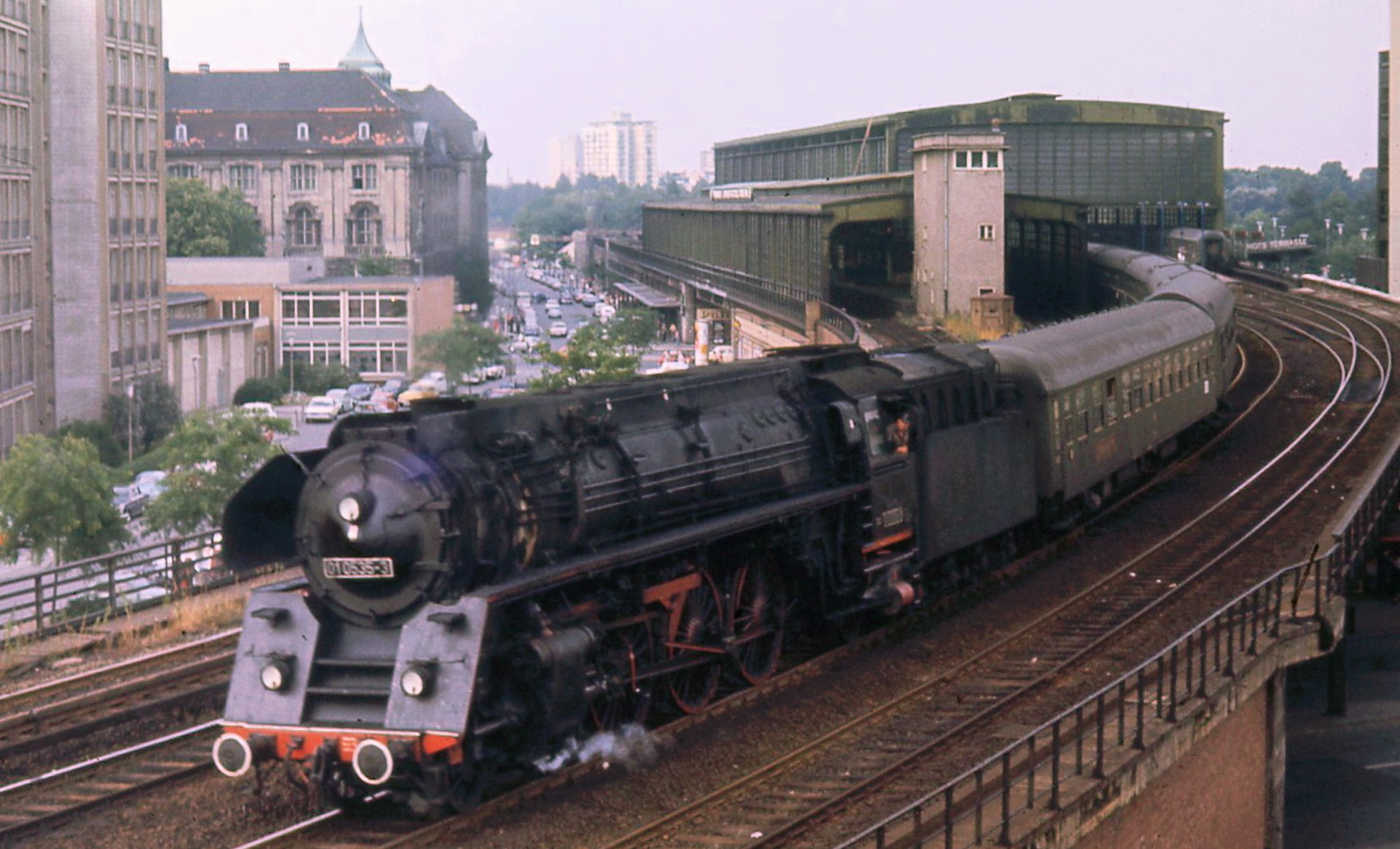
A DR Class 01.5 leaves with a train for the West, 1973.

The fact that, with only two platforms and four tracks for long-distance trains, the station was still the most important in West Berlin, was another unnatural phenomenon of the divided city. After reunification, despite the outcry from nearby Kurfürstendamm retailers and local politicians, the station lost its importance following the launching of the new Berlin Hauptbahnhof on 28 May 2006, because long-distance services began passing through the station without stopping. An exception was the famous Sibirjak, which departed from Bahnhof Zoo for the Novosibirsk Trans-Siberian railway station until 2013.

== Train services ==
In the 2026 timetable the following lines stop at the station:

Line	Route (main stops)			Frequency
ICE 9	Berlin Ostbahnhof – Berlin Zoologischer Garten – Berlin Hbf – Berlin-Spandau – Köln – Bonn			Some trains
ICE 10	Cologne –	Düsseldorf – Duisburg – Essen – Dortmund –	Hamm – Bielefeld – Hanover – Wolfsburg – Berlin Zoologischer Garten – Berlin Hbf – Berlin Ostbahnhof	Some trains
ICE 10	Cologne –	Wuppertal – Hagen –	Hamm – Bielefeld – Hanover – Wolfsburg – Berlin Zoologischer Garten – Berlin Hbf – Berlin Ostbahnhof	Some trains
ICE 12	Switzerland – Basel – Freiburg – Karlsruhe – Mannheim – Frankfurt – Kassel – Braunschweig – Wolfsburg – Berlin Zoologischer Garten – Berlin Hbf – Berlin Ostbahnhof			Some trains
ICE 13	Karlsruhe → Heidelberg → Darmstadt →	Frankfurt South → Kassel → Braunschweig → Wolfsburg → Berlin Zoologischer Garten → Berlin Hbf → Berlin Ostbahnhof		Two trains
ICE 13	Frankfurt Airport →	Frankfurt South → Kassel → Braunschweig → Wolfsburg → Berlin Zoologischer Garten → Berlin Hbf → Berlin Ostbahnhof		Two trains
ICE 14	Cologne → Düsseldorf → Duisburg → Essen →	Bochum → Dortmund → Hamm → Bielefeld →	Hanover → Berlin Zoologischer Garten → Berlin Hbf → Berlin Ostbahnhof	Two trains
ICE 14	Cologne → Düsseldorf → Duisburg → Essen →	Münster → Osnabrück →	Hanover → Berlin Zoologischer Garten → Berlin Hbf → Berlin Ostbahnhof	Two trains
FEX	Flughafen-Express; Berlin-Charlottenburg – Berlin Zoologischer Garten – Berlin Hbf – Berlin Friedrichstraße – Berlin Alexanderplatz – Berlin Ostbahnhof – Berlin Ostkreuz – Flughafen BER			Late night only
HBX	Harz-Berlin-Express; Berlin Ostbahnhof – Berlin Hbf – Berlin Zoologischer Garten – Potsdam – Magdeburg – Halberstadt (train split) – Quedlinburg – Thale / Wernigerode – Goslar			Some trains on the weekend
RE 1	Magdeburg – Brandenburg – Potsdam – Berlin Zoologischer Garten – Berlin Hbf – Erkner – Fürstenwalde – Frankfurt (Oder) (– Cottbus)			2–3 an hour
RE 2	Wismar – Schwerin – Wittenberge – Nauen – Berlin Zoologischer Garten – Berlin Hbf – Königs Wusterhausen – Lübben – Cottbus			Hourly
RE 7	Dessau – Bad Belzig – Michendorf – Berlin Zoologischer Garten – Berlin Hbf – Berlin Ostbahnhof – Wünsdorf-Waldstadt – Lübben (Spreewald) – Senftenberg			Hourly
RB 14	Nauen – Falkensee – Berlin-Spandau – Berlin-Charlottenburg – Berlin Zoologischer Garten – Berlin Hbf – Berlin Ostbahnhof			Hourly
RB 23	Golm – Potsdam – Potsdam Griebnitzsee – Berlin-Wannsee – Berlin Zoologischer Garten – Berlin Hbf – Berlin Ostbahnhof			Some trains in peak
S3	Spandau – Westkreuz – Berlin Zoologischer Garten – Hauptbahnhof – Alexanderplatz – Ostbahnhof – Karlshorst – Köpenick – Erkner			20 mins
S5	Westkreuz – Berlin Zoologischer Garten – Hauptbahnhof – Alexanderplatz – Ostbahnhof – Lichtenberg – Strausberg Nord			10 mins
S7	Potsdam – Wannsee – Westkreuz – Berlin Zoologischer Garten – Hauptbahnhof – Alexanderplatz – Ostbahnhof – Lichtenberg – Ahrensfelde			10 mins
S9	Spandau – Westkreuz – Berlin Zoologischer Garten – Hauptbahnhof – Alexanderplatz – Ostbahnhof – Schöneweide – Berlin Brandenburg Airport			20 mins

== In popular culture ==
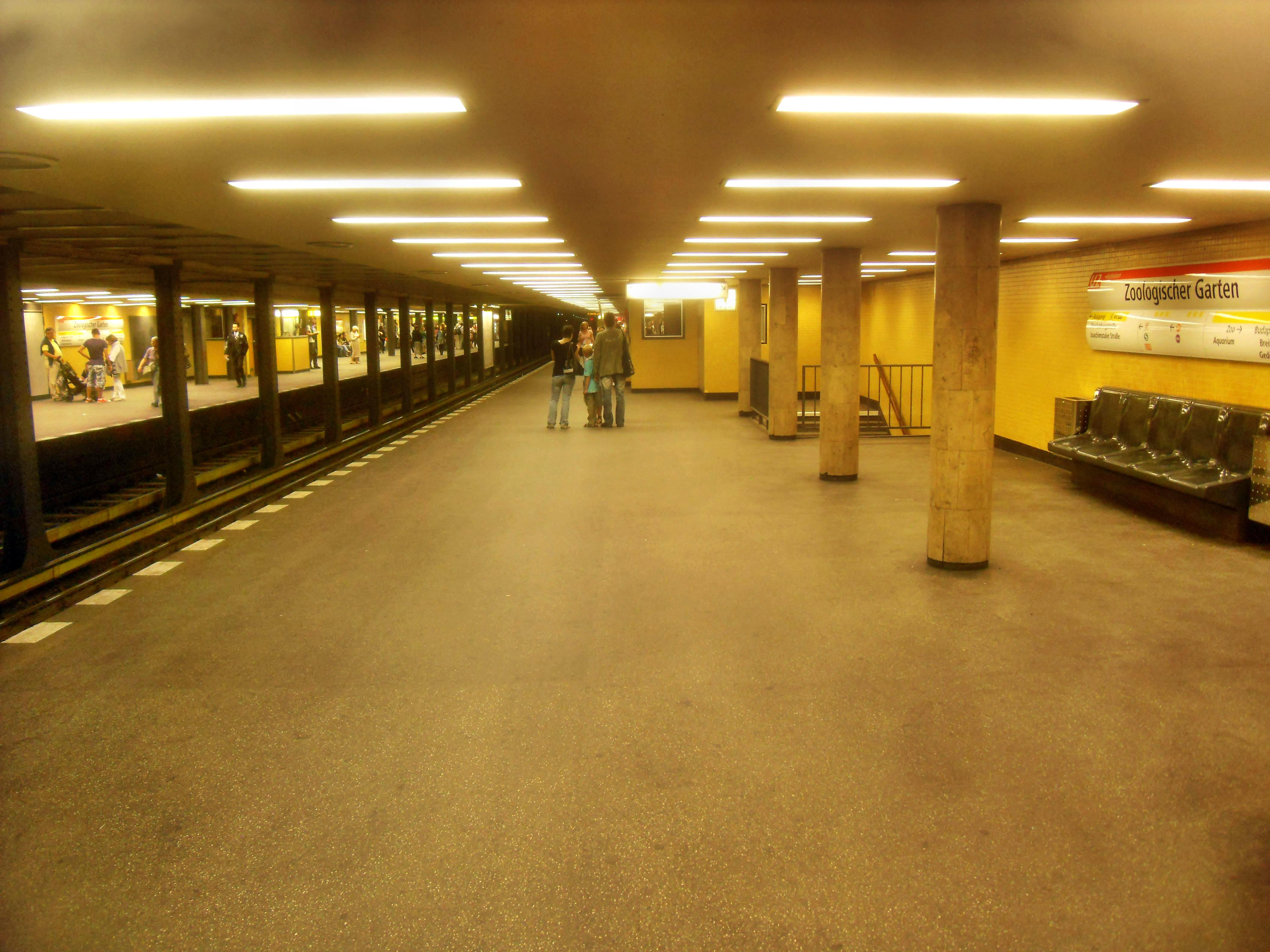
U-Bahn Station (U2 platforms)

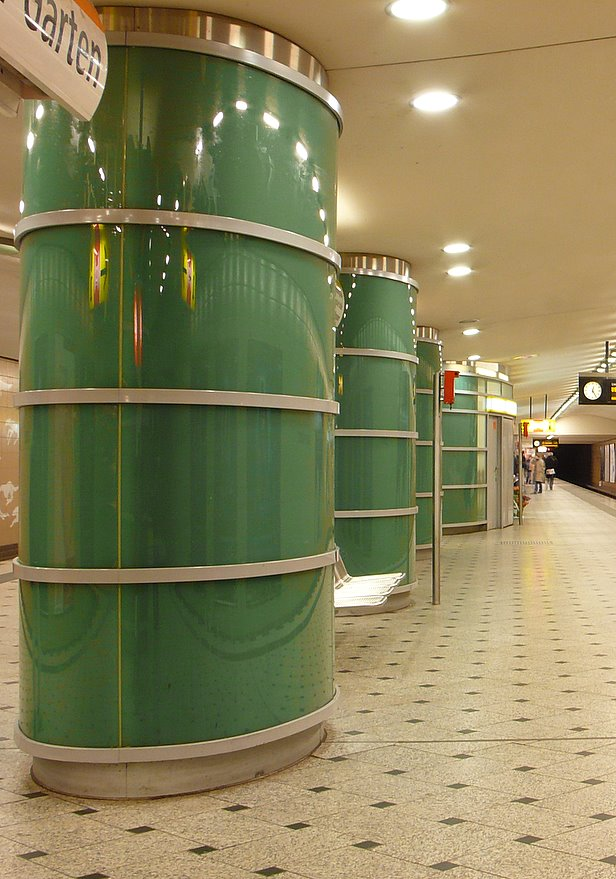
U-Bahn station (U9 platform)

- The station is well known as the setting of the 1978 book Zoo Station: The Story of Christiane F., ghostwritten by the Stern journalists Kai Hermann and Horst Rieck for Christiane Felscherinow. It became a bestseller in Germany, dramatising the period in the late 1970s when the rear of the station facing Jebensstraße was a meeting point for rent-boys, teen runaways, and drug addicts. The film Christiane F. – We Children from Bahnhof Zoo directed by Uli Edel was released in 1981. An eight-episode series inspired by the same story was later released in 2021, also titled Wir Kinder vom Bahnhof Zoo ("We children from Zoo Station").
- The 1929 children's novel Emil und die Detektive ("Emil and the Detectives"), written by Erich Kästner, prominently features the station as an important location. The subsequent film adaptations in 1931, 1954, 1964, and 2001 all include the station as a location which the protagonist, Emil Tischbein, visits.
- The 1991 U2 song "Zoo Station" was inspired by the station, written while the band was recording Achtung Baby at the Hansa Tonstudio in Berlin, which in turn inspired their Zoo TV Tour and the album Zooropa. Although the U-Bahn line U2 passes through the station today, it was numbered U1 at the time; a rearrangement and renumbering of the line took place in November 1993, when the section linking it to the remainder of the line in former East Berlin was reopened.
- The song "Auf'm Bahnhof Zoo" by Nina Hagen released on the 1978 album Nina Hagen Band refers to the station.
- The song "Zootime" by Mystery Jets ends with the line Wir sind die Kinder vom Bahnhof Zoo.
- "Bahnhof Zoo" is also a track on the 2005 album Randy the Band by the Swedish band Randy.
- The song "Big in Japan" by Alphaville refers to the Zoo station in the line "Should I stay here at the Zoo?".
- The song "Bahnhof Zoo" by port-royal takes its name from the station.
- The song "Slept" by The Sisters of Mercy was inspired by this station.
- The book Zoo Station: Adventures in East and West Berlin by Ian Walker was published in 1987 by Atlantic Monthly Press. It recounts the author's experiences in 1980s Berlin, his encounters with the young people on both sides of the wall, and their separation and occasional commingling.
- The book Zoo Station by David Downing, published by Soho Press in 2007, is the first in a series of World War II spy thrillers set in Berlin.
- Zoo Bahnhof was one of the murder scenes in The Pale Criminal (1990), a historical detective novel by Philip Kerr.
