= Berlin Savignyplatz station =

Railway station in Berlin, Germany

Savignyplatz
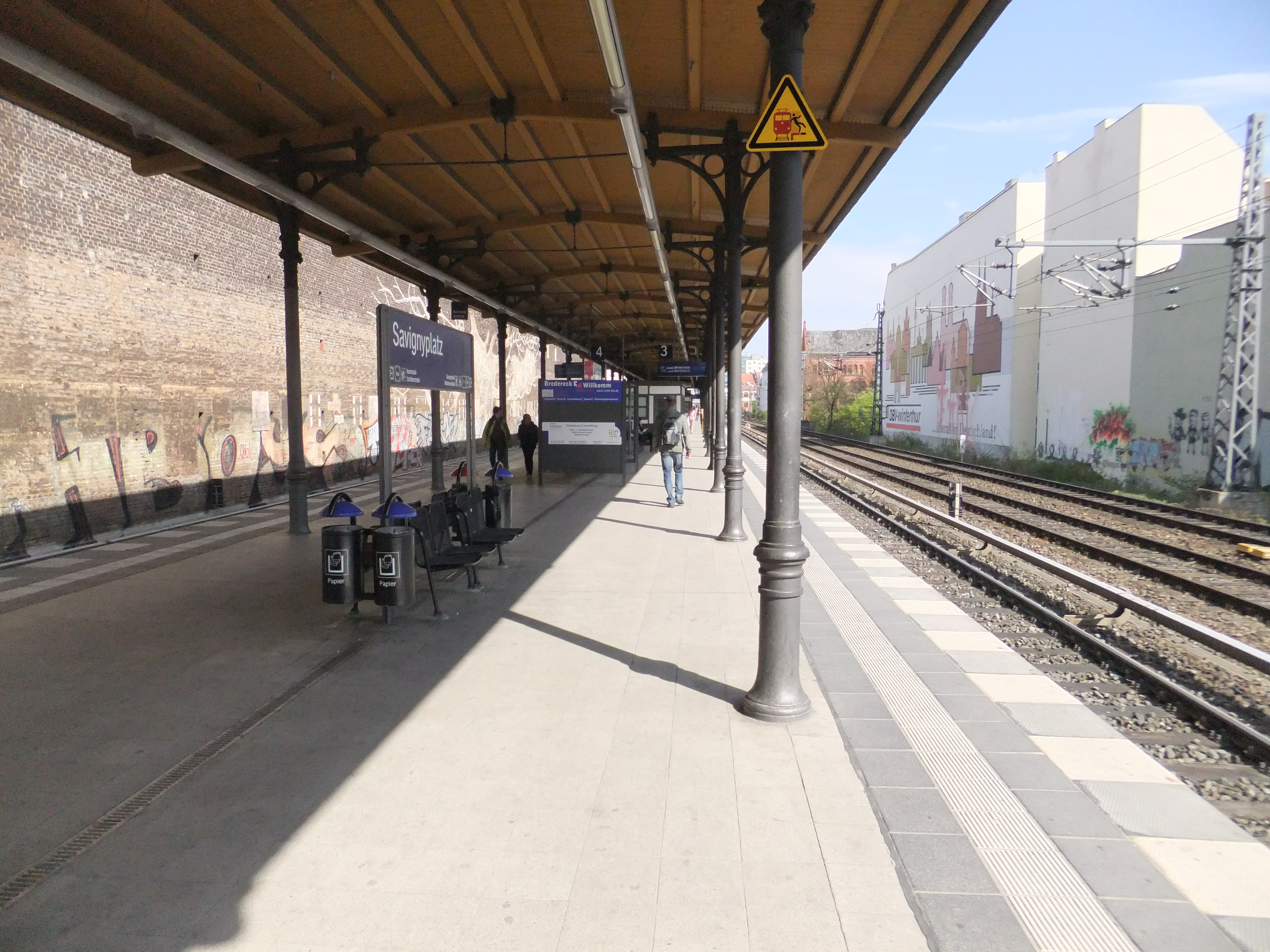
- Platform

General information
- Location: Charlottenburg-Wilmersdorf, Berlin; Germany
- Coordinates: 52°30′19″N 13°19′8″E
- Line: Stadtbahn
- Platforms: 2

Construction
- Accessible: Yes

Other information
- Station code: 5523
- DS100 code: BSAV
- IBNR: 8089037
- Category: 4
- Fare zone: : Berlin A/5555
- Website: www.bahnhof.de

History
- Opened: 1 August 1896

Services
Preceding station	Berlin S-Bahn	Following station
Charlottenburg towards Spandau	S3	Zoologischer Garten towards Erkner
Charlottenburg towards Westkreuz	S5	Zoologischer Garten towards Strausberg Nord
Charlottenburg towards Potsdam Hbf	S7	Zoologischer Garten towards Ahrensfelde
Charlottenburg towards Spandau	S9	Zoologischer Garten towards BER Airport
Location

Berlin Savignyplatz is a railway station on the Berlin Stadtbahn line in the Charlottenburg district of Berlin. It is served by the S-Bahn lines S3, S5, S7, and S9. It is the newest of the stations on the Stadtbahn. The island platform, which is covered by a gable roof supported by cast iron columns, and the open entrance hall have monument protection. It has two entrances, one from a pedestrian zone connecting from the park of Savigny Platz via the street of Else-Ury-Bogen and a second from Schlüterstraße.

== History ==
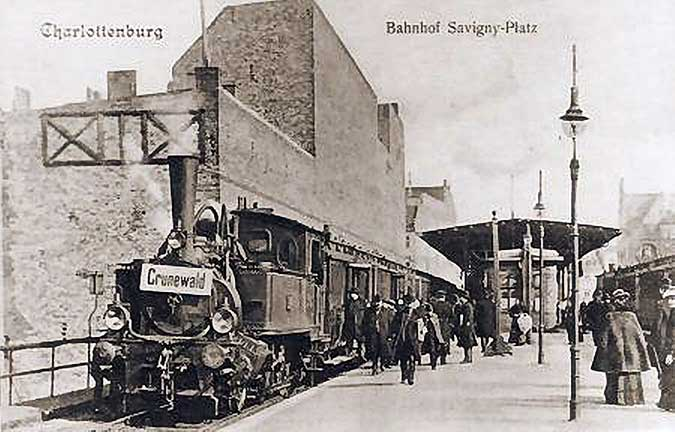
Savignyplatz station about 1900

The station was built in 1895/1896 on typical arches of the Berlin Stadtbahn in the middle of the then new residential area around Savigny Platz (named after the jurist Friedrich Carl von Savigny) between the stations of Zoologischer Garten (Zoo) and Charlottenburg. The opening took place on 1 August 1896.

In 1934, the station’s two stairwells with their nameplates and the entrance rooms were modernised. At the same time the railway arches in this area were given a dark brick facade.

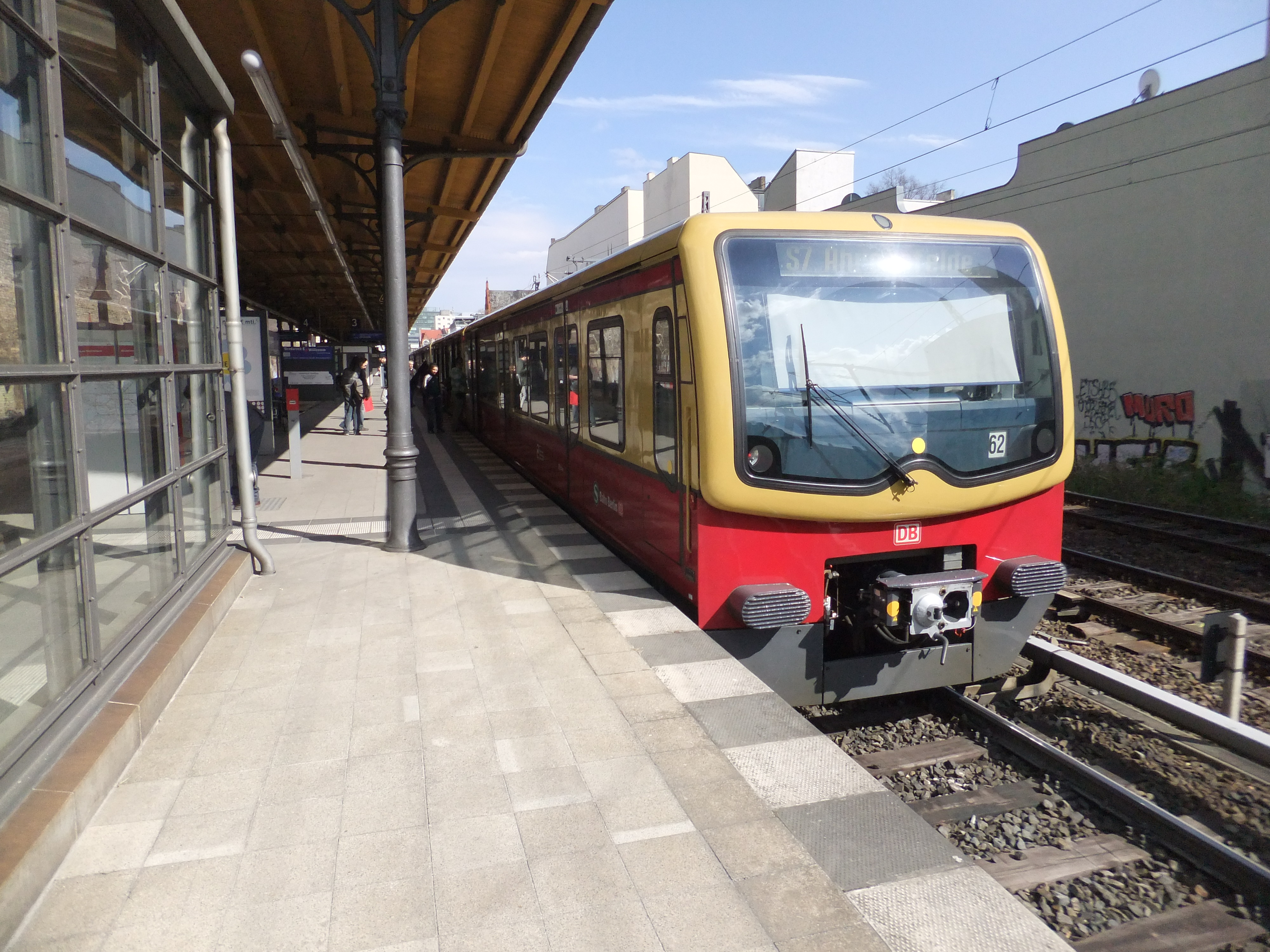
Class 481 in Savignyplatz station
