= Berlin Ostbahnhof =

Railway station in Berlin, Germany

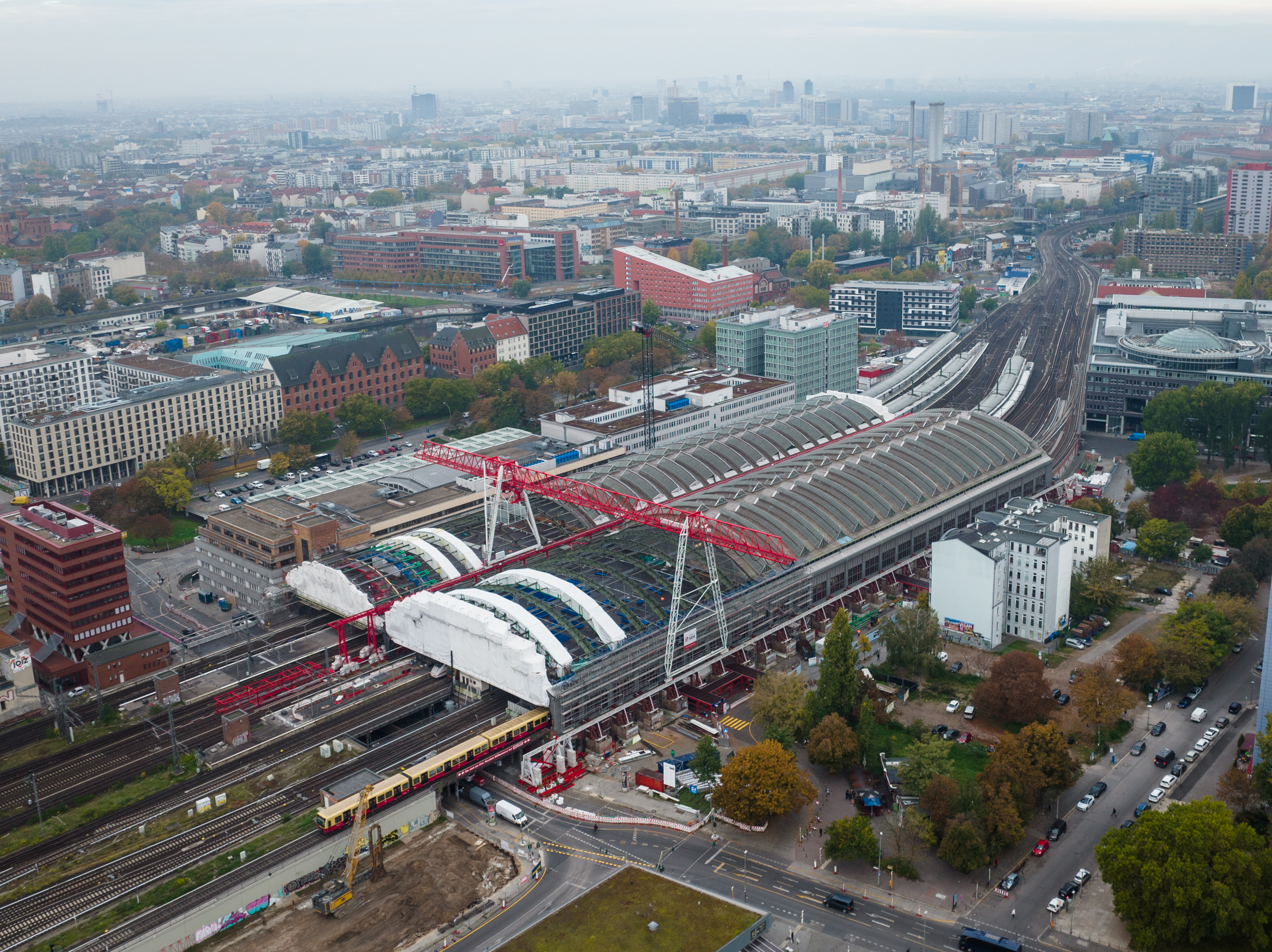
- Station building (2022)

General information
- Location: Koppenstraße 3; 10243 Berlin; Friedrichshain-Kreuzberg, Berlin, Berlin; Germany
- Coordinates: 52°30′36″N 13°26′05″E
- Owner: DB InfraGO
- Lines: Stadtbahn; Prussian Eastern Railway; Lower Silesian-Markish Railway
- Platforms: 4 island platforms 1 side platform
- Tracks: 11
- Train operators: DB Fernverkehr; DB Regio Nordost; S-Bahn Berlin

Construction
- Accessible: Yes

Other information
- Station code: 1071
- DS100 code: BHF, BOSB
- Category: 1
- Fare zone: : Berlin A/5555
- Website: www.bahnhof.de

History
- Opened: 1842
Services
Preceding station	DB Fernverkehr	Following station
Berlin Hbf towards Bonn Hbf	ICE 9 Sprinter	Terminus
Berlin Hbf towards Köln Hbf	ICE 10	Terminus
Berlin Hbf towards Brig, Chur or Interlaken Ost	ICE 12	Terminus
Berlin Hbf towards Frankfurt Airport, Frankfurt (Main) Hbf, Karlsruhe Hbf or Stuttgart Hbf	ICE 13	Terminus
Berlin Hbf towards Köln Hbf	ICE 14	Terminus
Berlin Hbf towards Saarbrücken Hbf or Stuttgart Hbf	ICE 16	Terminus
Berlin Hbf towards Bremen Hbf or Koblenz Hbf	ICE 19	Terminus
Berlin Hbf towards Norddeich Mole	IC 56	Königs Wusterhausen towards Cottbus Hbf
Berlin Hbf towards Amsterdam Centraal	ICE 77	Terminus
Berlin Hbf Terminus	EC 95 EIC	Frankfurt (Oder) towards Warszawa Wschodnia
Berlin Hbf Terminus	EC 95 IC	Frankfurt (Oder) towards Gdynia Główna
Berlin Hbf Terminus	EC 95 IC	Frankfurt (Oder) towards Przemyśl Główny
Berlin Hbf Terminus	EC 96 IC	Frankfurt (Oder) towards Przemyśl Główny
Preceding station	European Sleeper	Following station
Berlin Zoologischer Garten One-way operation	Brussels–Prague	Dresden Hbf towards Prague
Berlin Hbf towards Brussels-South	Brussels–Prague	Dresden Hbf towards Prague
Preceding station	DB Regio Nordost	Following station
Berlin Alexanderplatz towards Dessau Hbf	RE 7	Berlin Ostkreuz towards Senftenberg
Berlin Alexanderplatz towards Nauen	RB 14	Terminus
Berlin Alexanderplatz towards Golm	RB 23	Terminus
Preceding station	Ostdeutsche Eisenbahn	Following station
Berlin Alexanderplatz towards Brandenburg Hbf or Magdeburg Hbf	RE 1	Berlin Ostkreuz towards Cottbus Hbf or Frankfurt (Oder)
Berlin Alexanderplatz towards Nauen	RE 2	Berlin Ostkreuz towards Cottbus Hbf
Preceding station	Berlin S-Bahn	Following station
Jannowitzbrücke towards Spandau	S3	Warschauer Straße towards Erkner
Jannowitzbrücke towards Westkreuz	S5	Warschauer Straße towards Strausberg Nord
Jannowitzbrücke towards Potsdam Hbf	S7	Warschauer Straße towards Ahrensfelde
Jannowitzbrücke towards Spandau	S9	Warschauer Straße towards BER Airport
Location

Berlin Ostbahnhof (German for Berlin East railway station) is a main line railway station in Berlin, Germany. It is located in the Friedrichshain quarter, now part of Friedrichshain-Kreuzberg borough, and has undergone several name changes in its history. It was known as Berlin Hauptbahnhof from 1987 to 1998, a name now applied to Berlin's new central station at the former Lehrter station. Alongside Berlin Zoologischer Garten station it was one of the city's two main stations; however, it has declined in significance since the opening of the new Hauptbahnhof on 26 May 2006, and many mainline trains have been re-routed on the North–South mainline through the new Tiergarten tunnel, bypassing Ostbahnhof. This station is open 24/7.

== History ==
=== Early history ===
The station opened on 23 October 1842 as Frankfurter Bahnhof, the terminus of an 81 km (50 mi) railway line to Frankfurt (Oder) via Fürstenwalde (Spree). In 1845 the previously independent Berlin–Frankfurt railway merged into the Niederschlesisch-Märkische-Eisenbahngesellschaft (Lower Silesian-Markish Railway Company, NME), aiming at the extension of the line from Frankfurt to Breslau.

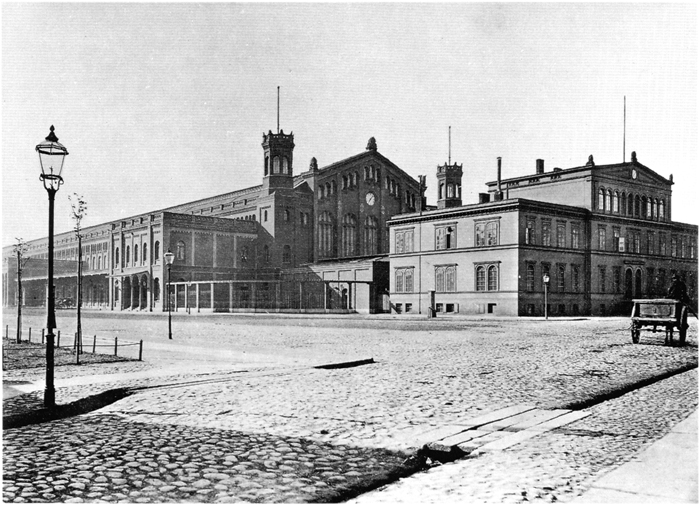
The Frankfurter Bahnhof in 1870

In 1867, the Old Ostbahnhof (also called Küstriner Bahnhof), the terminus of the Prussian Eastern Railway line, opened, located slightly north of the present Ostbahnhof station. This station briefly functioned as the replacement for a new Frankfurter Bahnhof, which was opened in 1869. This station stood for a mere ten years, until construction began to transform it into a through station for the Berlin Stadtbahn, an elevated railway through the Berlin city center built to link the city's major stations. The Stadtbahn was completed in 1882; two of the four tracks later came to form one of the main routes of the Berlin S-Bahn suburban railway. On the opening of the Stadtbahn, the Küstriner Bahnhof was closed, and trains on the Ostbahn came to terminate at the now renamed Schlesischer Bahnhof (Silesian station).

As the terminus of both the Silesian and the Eastern Railway line, the station quickly developed into Berlin's "Gate to the East". Until World War I, trains ran from the German capital via Königsberg to Saint Petersburg (Nord Express) and to Moscow as well as to Vienna, Budapest, and Constantinople via Breslau and Kattowitz. During the Anti-Jewish pogroms in the Russian Empire, numerous Jewish refugees arrived here to travel on to the emigration harbors in Hamburg and Bremerhaven.

=== World War II and GDR ===
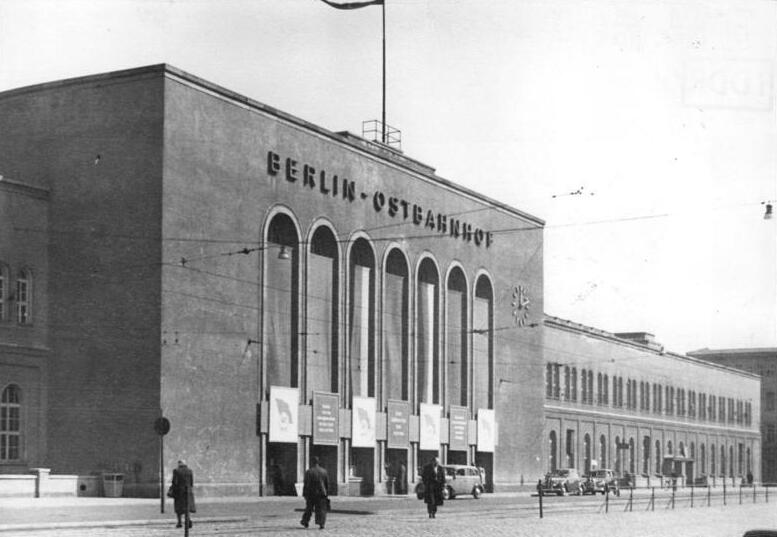
The Ostbanhof after its reconstruction following WWII (1954)

The station was severely damaged by strategic bombing during World War II and had to be completely rebuilt by the East German railway, the Deutsche Reichsbahn. In 1950 it was renamed Berlin Ostbahnhof, as upon the implementation of the Oder–Neisse line, the former Silesia province had become largely a part of Poland, and its German population were expelled. Memories of the German history of Silesia were repressed by the German Democratic Republic. Following the division of Germany, the station was, together with Berlin-Lichtenberg, one of two major railway stations in East Berlin. The Berlin Wall ran only 200 metres (660 ft) away from the station; today that part is the East Side Gallery, the longest remaining fragment of the wall. Express trains ran from Ostbahnhof to Leipzig, Halle, and Dresden. The station was again served by international trains like the Vindobona to Vienna.

In 1987, the postwar building was demolished and the station began to be rebuilt as East Berlin's main station, grandly renamed Berlin Hauptbahnhof (Berlin Central Station). The plan called for a hotel and a large reception area for arriving Soviet bloc dignitaries. However, only part of the work was completed by the time of German reunification in 1990. A partially built staircase to the underground car park in front of the station, dating from this period, remains (in 2006) unfinished and fenced off. A partly constructed hotel was demolished in the early 1990s.

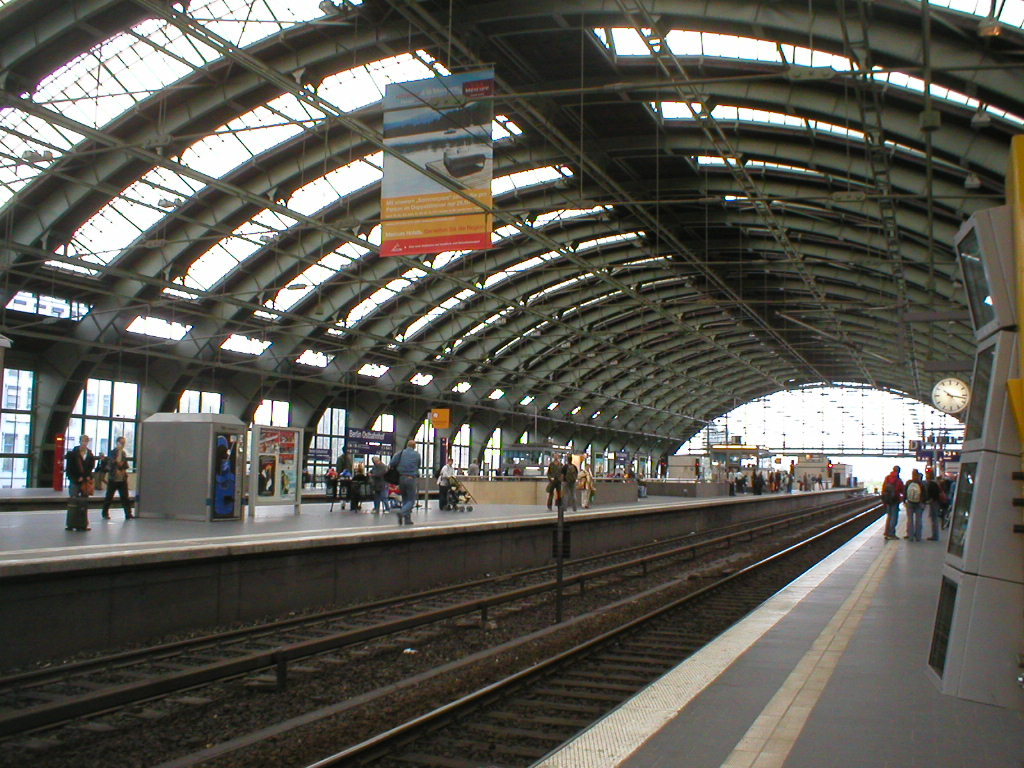
Looking west from a mainline platform, facing the two S-bahn platforms

=== Recent years ===
The name Hauptbahnhof remained long after the division of Berlin ended, until 1998, when the station was re-renamed Berlin Ostbahnhof, restoring the 1950-1987 name. One year later, work began to demolish the station and rebuild it again, a project that was completed in 2002. Little remains of the 1980s structure except for an administrative block, some façade elements, and parts of the platform structure.

== Characteristics ==
The station has 11 tracks and 5 platforms. 5 tracks are used for main line and 4 for S-Bahn. 2 tracks are through tracks.

== Train services ==
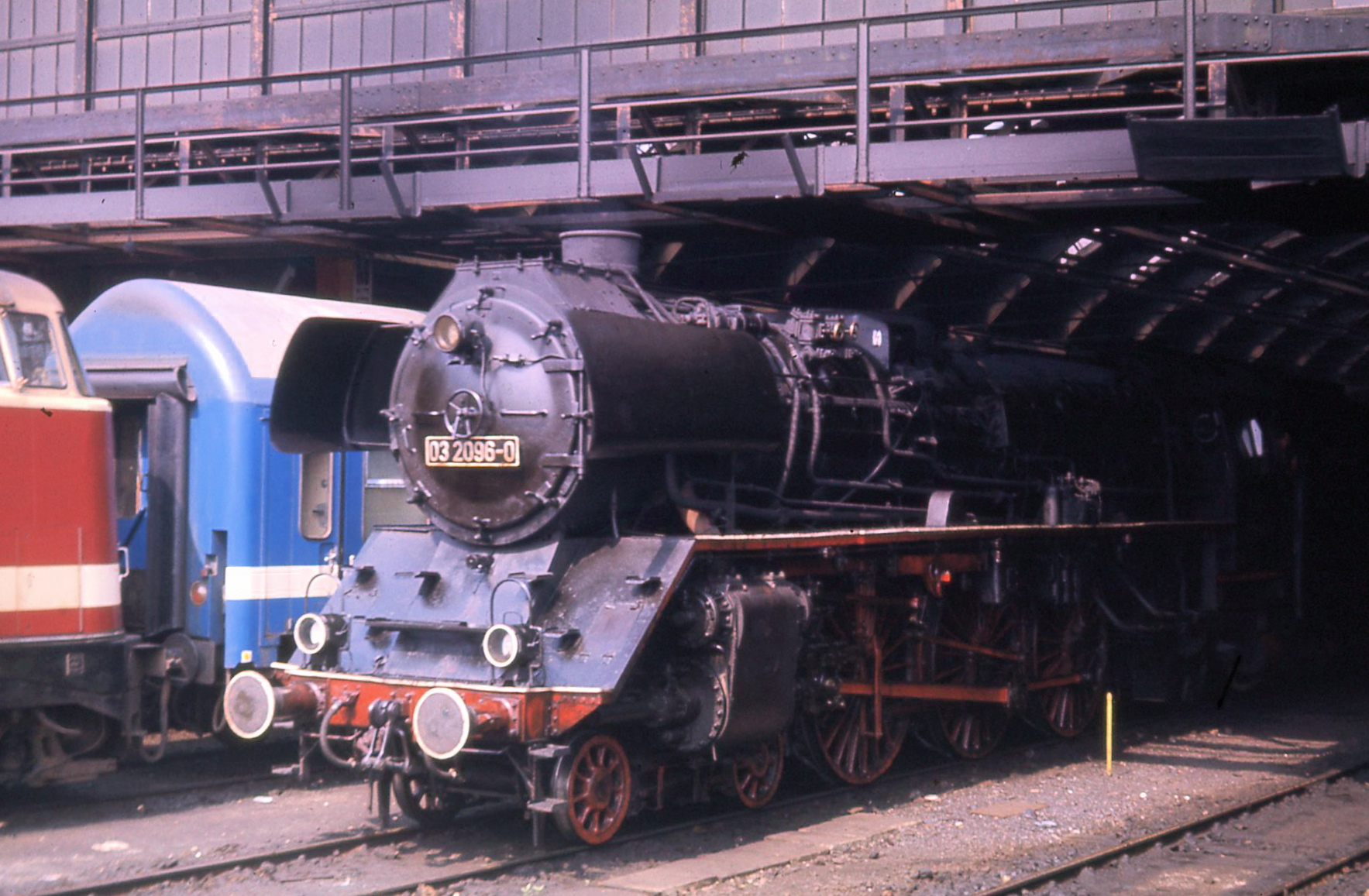
Awaiting eastbound departures in 1973.

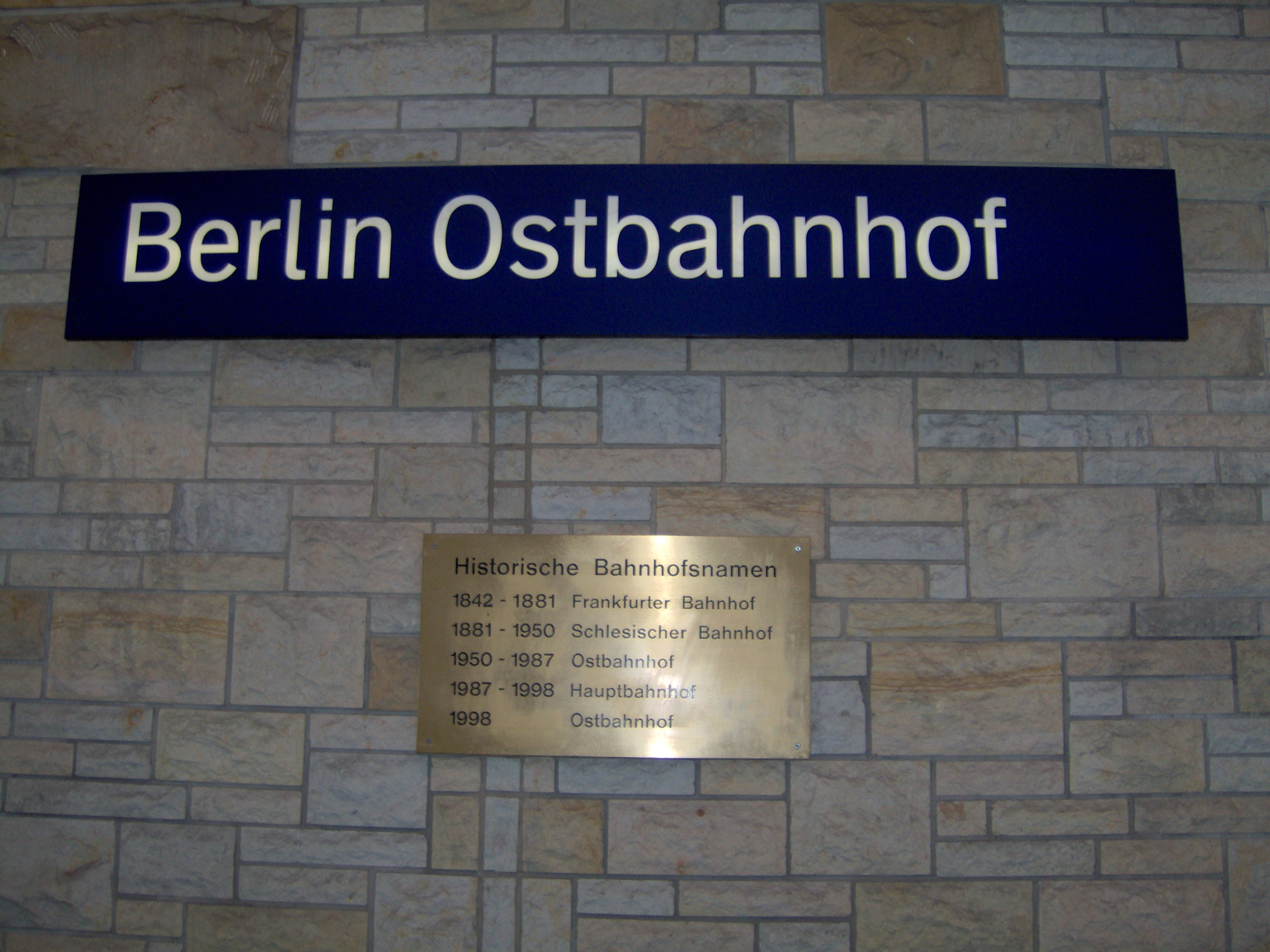
The station has been known by several names over its 160-year history.

In the 2026 timetable the following lines stop at the station:

=== Long distance ===
Line	Route				Interval
ICE 9	Bonn – Cologne – Berlin – Berlin Ostbahnhof				One train pair
ICE 10	Cologne –	Düsseldorf – Duisburg – Essen – Bochum – Dortmund –	Hamm – Bielefeld – Hanover – Wolfsburg – Berlin – Berlin Ostbahnhof		Hourly
ICE 10	Cologne –	Wuppertal – Hagen –	Hamm – Bielefeld – Hanover – Wolfsburg – Berlin – Berlin Ostbahnhof		Hourly
ICE 12	Switzerland – Basel – Freiburg – Karlsruhe – Mannheim – Frankfurt – Kassel – Braunschweig – Wolfsburg – Berlin – Berlin Ostbahnhof				Every 2 hours
ICE 13	Stuttgart –	Heidelberg – Darmstadt –	Frankfurt South – Kassel – Braunschweig – Wolfsburg – Berlin – Berlin Ostbahnhof		Every 2 hours
ICE 13	Karlsruhe –	Heidelberg – Darmstadt –	Frankfurt South – Kassel – Braunschweig – Wolfsburg – Berlin – Berlin Ostbahnhof		Every 2 hours
ICE 13	Frankfurt Airport –		Frankfurt South – Kassel – Braunschweig – Wolfsburg – Berlin – Berlin Ostbahnhof		Every 2 hours
ICE 14	Cologne – Düsseldorf – Essen –	Bochum – Dortmund – Hamm – Bielefeld –		Hanover – Berlin – Berlin Ostbahnhof	Twice a day
ICE 14	Cologne – Düsseldorf – Essen –	Münster – Osnabrück –		Hanover – Berlin – Berlin Ostbahnhof	Twice a day
ICE 19	Berlin Ostbahnhof – Berlin Hbf – Berlin-Spandau – Hanover – Bielefeld – Hagen – Wuppertal – Cologne (– Bonn – Koblenz – Mainz – Mannheim – Heidelberg – Stuttgart)				Every 2 hours
IC 56	Norddeich Mole – Emden – Oldenburg – Bremen – Hannover – Magdeburg – Potsdam – Berlin Ostbahnhof – Cottbus				One train pair
ICE 77	Berlin Ostbahnhof – Berlin Hbf – Wolfsburg – Hanover – Osnabrück	– Rheine – Amersfoort – Amsterdam			Every 2 hours
ICE 77	Berlin Ostbahnhof – Berlin Hbf – Wolfsburg – Hanover – Osnabrück	– Münster			1 early service from Münster
EC 95; PKP: EIC	Berlin-Warszawa-Express: Berlin Hbf – Frankfurt (Oder) – Poznań – Warszawa Centralna				Four train pairs daily
EC 95; PKP: IC	Gedania: Berlin Hbf – Frankfurt (Oder) – Poznań – Gdynia Głowna				One train per day
EC 95; PKP: IC	Wawel: Berlin Hbf – Frankfurt (Oder) – Wrocław – Katowice – Kraków – Rzeszów – Przemyśl				One train per day
NJ Berlin-Zürich	Berlin Ostbahnhof – (Braunschweig – Göttingen –) Frankfurt (Main) Süd – Mannheim – Freiburg – Basel – Zürich				One train pair
NJ	Nightjet; Berlin-Charlottenburg – Berlin Ostbahnhof – Frankfurt (Oder) – Wrocław –		Ostrava – Breclav –	Vienna	One train pair
NJ	Nightjet; Berlin-Charlottenburg – Berlin Ostbahnhof – Frankfurt (Oder) – Wrocław –		Ostrava – Breclav –	Bratislava – Budapest	One train pair
NJ	Nightjet; Berlin-Charlottenburg – Berlin Ostbahnhof – Frankfurt (Oder) – Wrocław –		Katowice – Kraków – Przemyśl		One train pair
ES	Brussels – Rotterdam – Amsterdam – Amersfoort – Bad Bentheim – Berlin – Berlin Ostbahnhof – Dresden – Bad Schandau – Prague				1 train pair thrice a week

=== Regional services ===
Line	Route	Interval
HBX	Harz-Berlin-Express; Berlin Ostbahnhof – Berlin Hbf – Berlin Zoologischer Garten – Potsdam – Magdeburg – Halberstadt (train split) (– Quedlinburg – Thale) / (Wernigerode – Goslar)	2 train pairs at the weekend
FEX	Airport Express; Charlottenburg – Berlin Hbf – Berlin Alexanderplatz – Berlin Ostbahnhof – Berlin Ostkreuz - BER Airport	Some nighttime services
RE 1	Magdeburg – Brandenburg – Potsdam – Berlin-Wannsee – Berlin Hbf – Berlin Ostbahnhof – Erkner – Fürstenwalde (Spree) – Frankfurt (Oder) (– Cottbus)	2–3 services per hour
RE 2	Nauen – Berlin-Spandau – Berlin Hbf – Berlin Ostbahnhof – Berlin Ostkreuz – Königs Wusterhausen – Lübbenau (Spreewald) – Vetschau – Cottbus	Hourly
RE 7	Dessau – Bad Belzig – Michendorf – Berlin-Wannsee – Berlin Hbf – Berlin Ostbahnhof – Königs Wusterhausen – Lübben (Spreewald) – Senftenberg	Hourly
RB 14	Nauen – Falkensee – Berlin-Spandau – Berlin-Charlottenburg – Berlin Hbf – Berlin Alexanderplatz – Berlin Ostbahnhof	Hourly
RB 23	Golm – Potsdam – Potsdam Griebnitzsee – Berlin-Wannsee – Berlin Hbf – Berlin Alexanderplatz – Berlin Ostbahnhof	Some trains in peak
S3	Spandau – Westkreuz – Hauptbahnhof – Alexanderplatz – Ostbahnhof – Ostkreuz – Karlshorst – Köpenick – Erkner	20 mins
S5	Westkreuz – Hauptbahnhof – Alexanderplatz – Ostbahnhof – Ostkreuz – Lichtenberg – Strausberg Nord	10 mins
S7	Potsdam – Wannsee – Westkreuz – Hauptbahnhof – Alexanderplatz – Ostbahnhof – Ostkreuz – Lichtenberg – Ahrensfelde	10 mins
S9	Spandau - Westkreuz – Hauptbahnhof - Alexanderplatz – Ostbahnhof – Schöneweide – BER Airport	20 mins

== See also ==
- East Side Gallery
- Deutsche Bahn
- Sibirjak
- S-Bahn Berlin
- B.V.G.
- Berlin Wriezener Bahnhof
