= Berlin-Charlottenburg station =

Railway station in Germany

Coordinates: 52°30′17″N 13°18′12″E

Berlin Charlottenburg
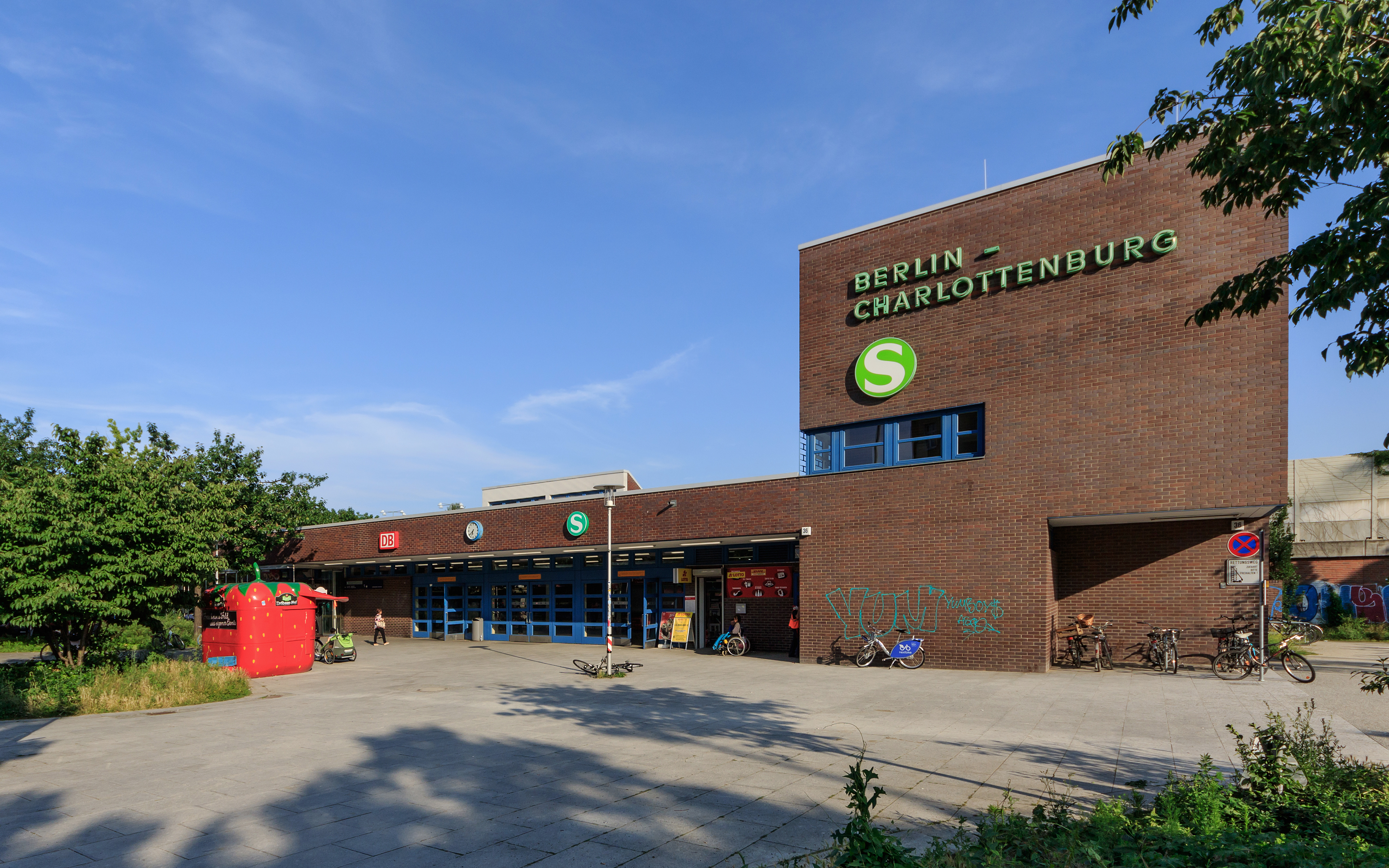
- Station building in 2017

General information
- Location: Stuttgarter Platz 36; 10627 Berlin; Charlottenburg-Wilmersdorf, Berlin; Germany
- Owner: DB Netz
- Operator: DB Station&Service

Other information
- Station code: 0537
- DS100 code: BCHB
- IBNR: 10403
- Category: 3
- Fare zone: : Berlin A/5555
- Website: www.bahnhof.de
Services
Preceding station	DB Regio Nordost	Following station
Terminus	Flughafen-Express	Berlin Zoologischer Garten towards BER Airport
Berlin-Spandau towards Wittenberge	RE 6	Terminus
Berlin-Wannsee towards Dessau Hbf	RE 7	Berlin Zoologischer Garten towards Senftenberg
Berlin-Spandau towards Nauen	RB 14	Berlin Zoologischer Garten towards Berlin Ostbahnhof
Berlin-Wannsee towards Golm	RB 23	Berlin Zoologischer Garten towards Berlin Ostbahnhof
Preceding station	Ostdeutsche Eisenbahn	Following station
Berlin-Wannsee towards Brandenburg Hbf or Magdeburg Hbf	RE 1	Berlin Zoologischer Garten towards Cottbus Hbf or Frankfurt (Oder)
Berlin-Spandau towards Nauen	RE 2	Berlin Zoologischer Garten towards Cottbus Hbf
Preceding station	Berlin S-Bahn	Following station
Westkreuz towards Spandau	S3	Savignyplatz towards Erkner
Westkreuz Terminus	S5	Savignyplatz towards Strausberg Nord
Westkreuz towards Potsdam Hbf	S7	Savignyplatz towards Ahrensfelde
Westkreuz towards Spandau	S9	Savignyplatz towards BER Airport
Location

Berlin-Charlottenburg is a railway station in the Charlottenburg district of Berlin, Germany. The station is located on the Stadtbahn line, served by the S3, S5, S7, and S9 lines of the Berlin S-Bahn, as well as by Regional-Express and Regionalbahn trains operated 24/7 by Deutsche Bahn. The U-Bahn station Wilmersdorfer Straße (U7) can be reached via short footpath.

== History ==
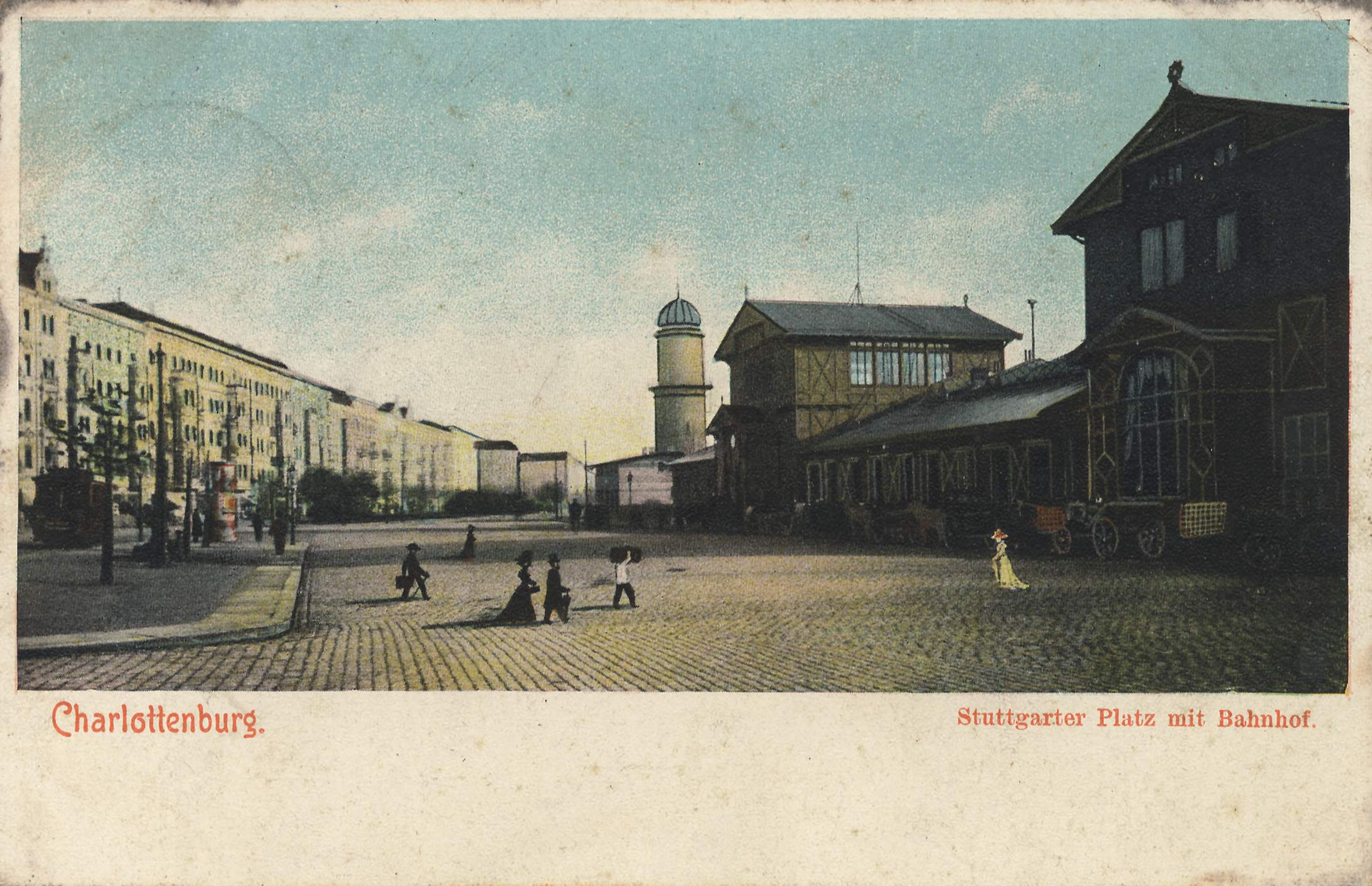
Charlottenburg Station on Stuttgarter Platz, 1907 postcard

The station was opened on 7 February 1882 as the western endpoint of the Stadtbahn line in the then independent town of Charlottenburg. From here the Berlin-Blankenheim railway ran southwestwards, a section of the Kanonenbahn rail route to Metz in Alsace-Lorraine.

The old station hall was damaged in World War II and only provisionally repaired afterwards. During the Cold War era parts of the track installations were reserved for the deployment of British Forces in Berlin. The station was the Berlin terminus for the British Military Train ("The Berliner") which carried allied military and diplomatic passengers across the GDR to Braunschweig in West Germany.

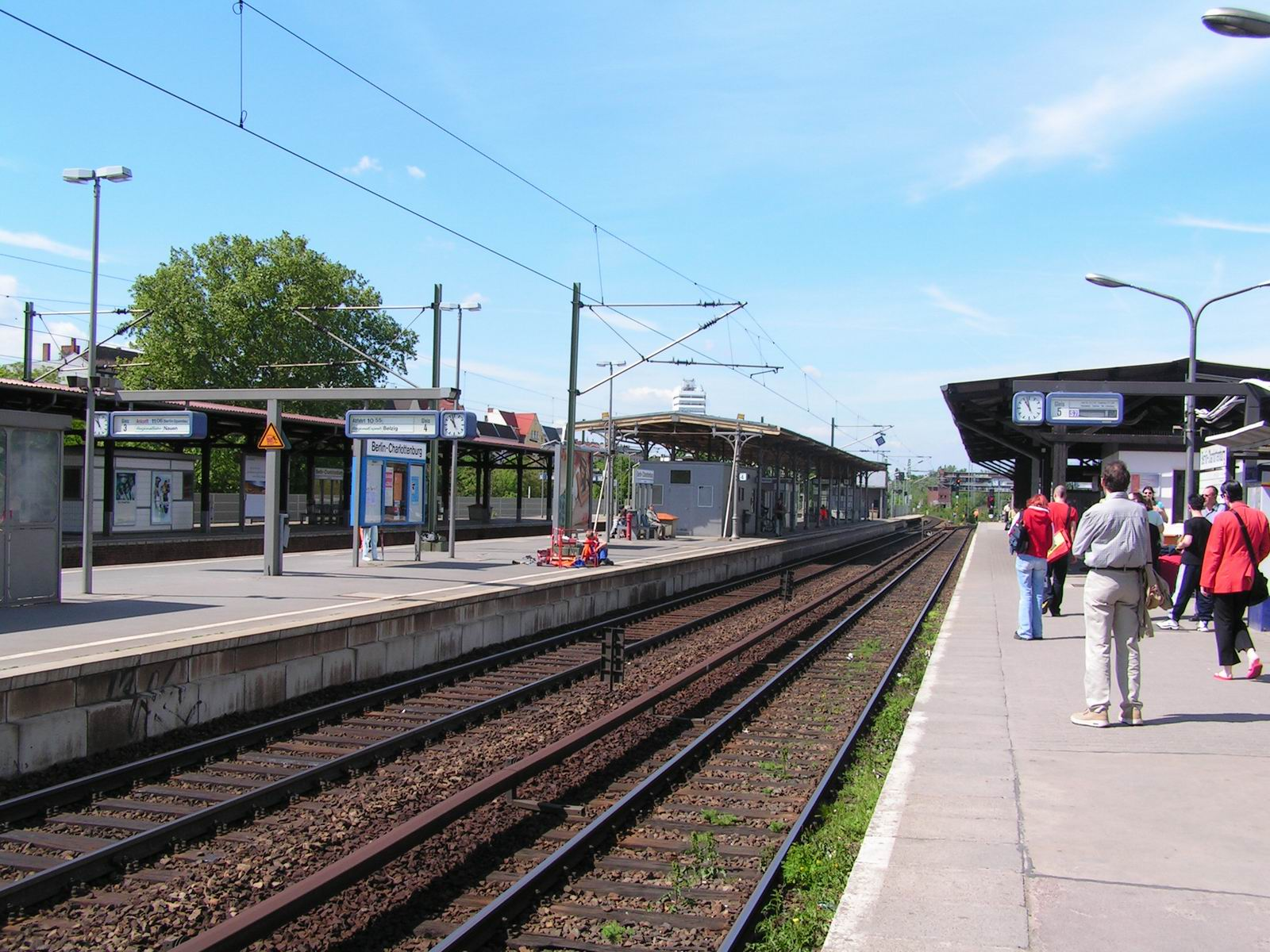
Platforms

When nearby Wilmersdorfer Straße was converted into a pedestrian zone, a new railway underpass was built at the site of the old station hall, which was then completely demolished and rebuilt, with the replacement opening on 6 July 1971. After the East German Deutsche Reichsbahn state railway passed the West Berlin S-Bahn network to the Berliner Verkehrsbetriebe (BVG) public transport company, Charlottenburg Station in the early morning of 9 January 1984 was the starting point of the first BVG operated train.

In 2003 the distance to the U-Bahn station Wilmersdorfer Straße was shortened by shifting the two S-Bahn platforms about 200 m (660 ft) further to the east and the opening of a new eastern entrance near the corner of the shopping street. In recent years the tracks have been equipped with noise barriers and the 1970s entrance building has been thermally refurbished.

== Train services ==
In the 2026 timetable the following lines stop at the station:

Line	Route (main stops)	Frequency
FEX	Berlin-Charlottenburg – Berlin Zoologischer Garten – Berlin Hbf – Berlin Friedrichstraße – Berlin Alexanderplatz – Berlin Ostbahnhof – Berlin Ostkreuz – BER Airport	Late night only
RE 1	Magdeburg – Brandenburg – Potsdam – Berlin-Charlottenburg – Berlin Hbf – Erkner – Fürstenwalde – Frankfurt (Oder) (– Cottbus)	2–3 an hour
RE 2	Nauen – Berlin-Charlottenburg – Berlin Hbf – Königs Wusterhausen – Lübben – Cottbus	Hourly
RE 6	Wittenberge – Perleberg – Pritzwalk – Neuruppin Rheinsberger Tor – Kremmen – Velten (Mark) – Hennigsdorf (b Berlin) – Falkensee – Berlin-Spandau – Berlin-Charlottenburg	Hourly
RE 7	Dessau – Bad Belzig – Michendorf – Berlin-Charlottenburg – Berlin Hbf – Berlin Ostbahnhof – Wünsdorf-Waldstadt – Lübben (Spreewald) – Senftenberg	Hourly
RB 14	Nauen – Falkensee – Berlin-Spandau – Berlin-Charlottenburg – Berlin Hbf – Berlin Ostbahnhof	Hourly
RB 23	Golm – Potsdam – Potsdam Griebnitzsee – Berlin-Wannsee – Berlin-Charlottenburg – Berlin Hbf – Berlin Ostbahnhof	Some trains in peak
S3	Spandau – Westkreuz – Berlin-Charlottenburg – Hauptbahnhof – Alexanderplatz – Ostbahnhof – Karlshorst – Köpenick – Erkner	20 mins
S5	Westkreuz – Berlin-Charlottenburg – Hauptbahnhof – Alexanderplatz – Ostbahnhof – Lichtenberg (– Strausberg Nord)	10 mins
S7	Potsdam – Wannsee – Westkreuz – Berlin-Charlottenburg – Hauptbahnhof – Alexanderplatz – Ostbahnhof – Lichtenberg – Ahrensfelde	10 mins
S9	Spandau – Westkreuz – Berlin-Charlottenburg – Hauptbahnhof – Alexanderplatz – Ostbahnhof – Schöneweide – Berlin Brandenburg Airport	20 mins
