= Berlin-Spandau station =

Railway station in Spandau, Berlin, Germany

Berlin-Spandau
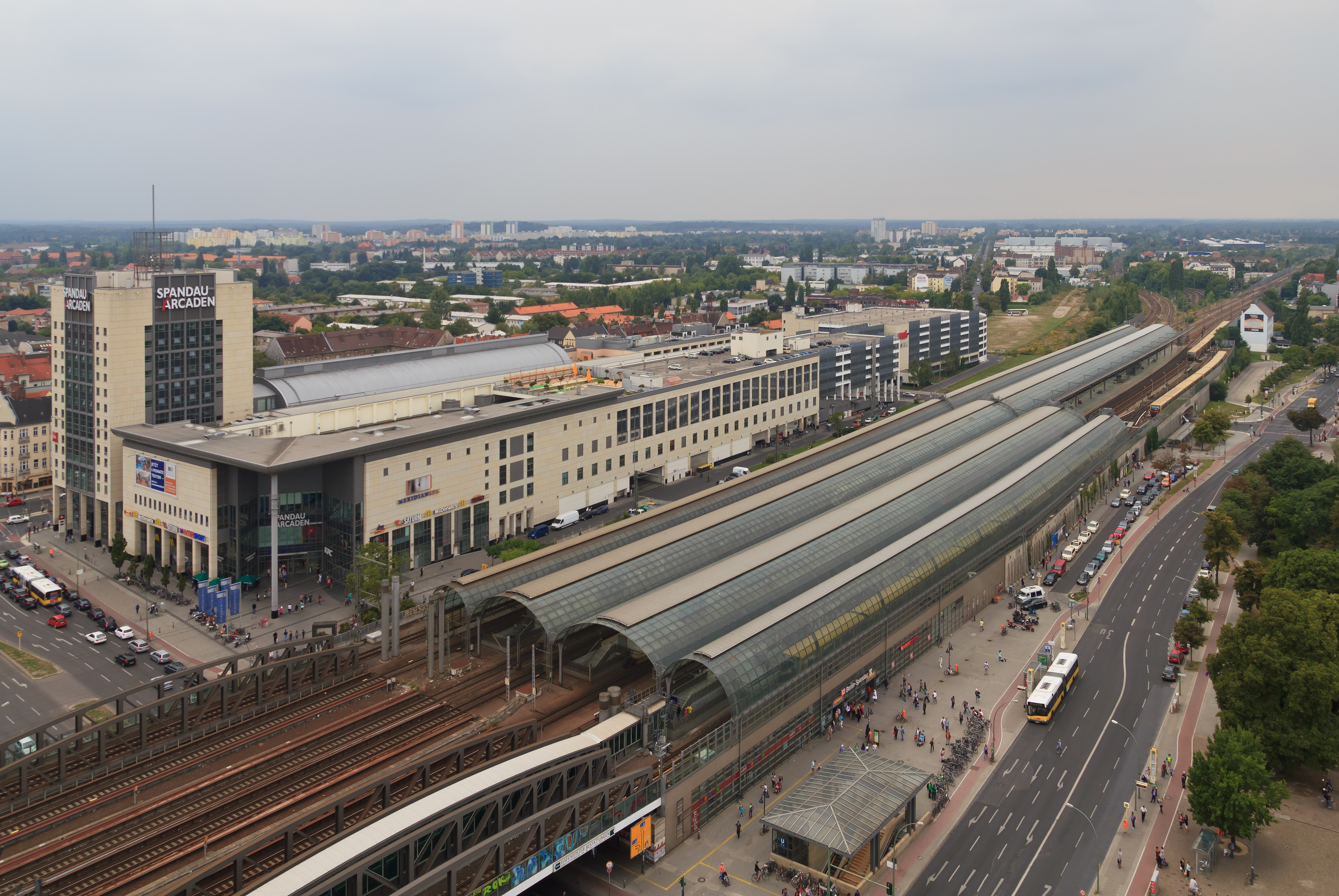

General information
- Location: Seegefelder Str. 1, Spandau, Berlin; Germany
- Coordinates: 52°32′05″N 13°11′45″E
- Lines: Hannover–Berlin HSL (km 112.7); Berlin Westkreuz–Berlin-Spandau (km 21.4); Berlin–Hamburg (km 12.5); Berlin–Lehrte (km 12.7)
- Platforms: 4 (long distance); 2 (S-Bahn)

Construction
- Accessible: Yes
- Architect: Gerkan, Marg and Partners

Other information
- Station code: 0561
- DS100 code: BSPD
- IBNR: 8010404
- Category: 2
- Fare zone: : Berlin B/5656
- Website: www.bahnhof.de

History
- Opened: 15 July 1910; 116 years ago
- Electrified: 23 August 1928; 98 years ago, 750 V DC system (3rd rail); 1 June 1997; 29 years ago, 15 kV AC system (overhead)
- Former names: 1910 Spandau Vorortbahnhof; 1910-1997 Spandau West

Key dates
- 1945 April 24 - June 9: operation interrupted
- 1951 August 14 - 1997 May 18: main line operation interrupted
- 1980 September 19 - 1998 December 29: operation interrupted
- 1996-1998: current building erected
Services
Preceding station	DB Fernverkehr	Following station
Frankfurt (Main) Hbf towards Frankfurt Airport Regional or Saarbrücken Hbf	ICE 3 Sprinter	Berlin Hbf towards Berlin Südkreuz
Köln Hbf towards Bonn Hbf	ICE 9 Sprinter	Berlin Hbf towards Berlin Südkreuz
Köln Hbf towards Bonn Hbf	ICE 9 Sprinter	Berlin Zoologischer Garten towards Berlin Ostbahnhof
Stendal Hbf towards Köln Hbf	ICE 10	Berlin Zoologischer Garten towards Berlin Ostbahnhof
Stendal Hbf towards Brig, Chur or Interlaken Ost	ICE 12	Berlin Zoologischer Garten towards Berlin Ostbahnhof
Stendal Hbf towards Frankfurt Airport, Frankfurt (Main) Hbf, Karlsruhe Hbf or Stuttgart Hbf	ICE 13	Berlin Zoologischer Garten towards Berlin Ostbahnhof
Wolfsburg Hbf towards Aachen Hbf	ICE 14	Berlin Zoologischer Garten towards Berlin Ostbahnhof
Hannover Hbf towards Oldenburg Hbf	ICE 16	Berlin Hbf towards Berlin Südkreuz
Wittenberge towards Hamburg-Altona	ICE 18	Berlin Hbf towards München Hbf
Wolfsburg Hbf towards Bremen Hbf or Koblenz Hbf	ICE 19	Berlin Zoologischer Garten towards Berlin Ostbahnhof
Wolfsburg Hbf towards Stuttgart Hbf	ICE 22	Berlin Hbf towards Berlin Ostbahnhof
Hamburg Hbf towards Hamburg-Altona	RJ 27	Berlin Hbf towards Praha hl.n., Budapest Nyugati or Wien Hbf
Hamburg Hbf towards København H	RJ 27	Berlin Hbf towards Praha hl.n., Budapest Nyugati or Wien Hbf
Hamburg Hbf towards Kiel Hbf	RJ 27	Berlin Hbf towards Praha hl.n.
Wittenberge towards Hamburg-Altona	ICE 28	Berlin Hbf towards München Hbf
Hannover Hbf towards Amsterdam Centraal	ICE 77	Berlin Hbf towards Berlin Ostbahnhof
Hamburg Hbf towards Hamburg-Altona	ICE 91	Berlin Hbf towards Praha hl.n.
Preceding station		Following station
Stendal Hbf towards Mainz Hbf	FLX 11	Berlin Hbf Terminus
Stendal Hbf towards Aachen Hbf	FLX 30	Berlin Hbf towards Leipzig Hbf
Stendal Hbf towards Hamburg Hbf	FLX 35	Berlin Hbf towards Leipzig Hbf
Preceding station	DB Regio Nordost	Following station
Berlin-Staaken towards Rathenow or Stendal Hbf	RE 4	Berlin Jungfernheide towards Jüterbog or Falkenberg (Elster)
Falkensee towards Wittenberge	RE 6	Berlin-Charlottenburg Terminus
Berlin Albrechtshof towards Nauen	RB 10	Berlin Jungfernheide towards Rangsdorf
Berlin Albrechtshof towards Nauen	RB 14	Berlin-Charlottenburg towards Berlin Ostbahnhof
Berlin-Staaken towards Potsdam Hbf	RB 21	Berlin Jungfernheide towards Berlin Gesundbrunnen
Preceding station	Ostdeutsche Eisenbahn	Following station
Berlin Albrechtshof towards Nauen	RE 2	Berlin-Charlottenburg towards Cottbus Hbf
Falkensee towards Wismar	RE 8	Berlin Jungfernheide towards Elsterwerda
Preceding station	Berlin S-Bahn	Following station
Terminus	S3	Stresow towards Erkner
Terminus	S9	Stresow towards BER Airport
Preceding station	Berlin U-Bahn	Following station
Terminus	U7	Altstadt Spandau towards Rudow
Location

Berlin-Spandau station is a Deutsche Bahn station in the Berlin district of Spandau on the south-western edge of the old town of Spandau. The railway junction station is one of the 80 stations classified by Deutsche Bahn as a category 2 station. It has the longest train shed (440 metres (1,440 ft)) in Germany.

The high-traffic station with six platform tracks is a transfer point between long-distance passenger services—Intercity-Express (ICE), Intercity (IC) and EuroCity (EC)—and regional services (S-Bahn, Regionalbahn and Regional-Express). It also provides connections to the inner city by the public transport services operated by the Berliner Verkehrsbetriebe: buses and U-Bahn line U7 at the adjacent Rathaus Spandau station.

The Berlin–Hamburg railway from the northwest and the Berlin–Lehrte railway from the west join west of the station and the combined lines, after passing through the station, runs over a bridge over the Havel and continues to the east and then runs jointly with the Ringbahn (Ring Railway) for some distance on its way to Berlin Hauptbahnhof. The line running from the station was initially parallel with the Spandau Suburban Line of the S-Bahn, which connects with the Berlin Stadtbahn to reach Berlin Hauptbahnhof by a different route.

Spandau station is also the terminus of the S-Bahn line, although there is a proposal to extend it into the Havelland. The Bahnhof Spandau and Rathaus Spandau bus stops in front of the station entrance are served by more than ten regional bus lines and city bus lines and they constitute the most important bus node in Berlin after Hardenbergplatz next to Berlin Zoologischer Garten station.

== Description ==
The station has six platform tracks, four for regional and long-distance services and two for the S-Bahn. Outside the four-arch train shed there is also a freight track. It has the DB Station code of BSPD, while the code of the S-Bahn section is BSPA.

The station building was built between 1996 and 1998, while rail railway operations continued, to the design of the architectural bureau of Gerkan, Marg and Partners. It has a striking vaulted roof of glass that completely covers the platforms over a length of 432 metres (1,417 ft) in the style of classic railway architecture. A direct platform tunnel has been built under the tracks on the western side parallel to the new street of Am Bahnhof Spandau and a path giving access to the platforms runs to the east of the entrance hall near Klosterstraße.

The entrance hall is 16 metres (52 ft) wide.

== History ==
As early as 1871, there was a station at this point on the newly opened Berlin–Lehrte railway, which was called the Lehrter Bahnhof (“station on the railway to Lehrte”) to distinguish it from the Hamburger Bahnhof (“station on the railway to Hamburg”) in Spandau. This station was closed for passengers on 1 October 1890, so that local and long-distance trains only stopped in Spandau at the Hamburger Bahnhof, which was now called the Spandau Personenbahnhof (“Spandau passenger station”). The Lehrter Bahnhof took over the freight operations in Spandau and operated as Spandau freight yard (Güterbahnhof) on the grounds where the shopping centre of Spandau Arcaden (“arcades”) is now located. The half-timbered building of the former Lehrter Bahnhof was dismantled in 1890 and in 1891 the Stadtpark restaurant was built; this was demolished in 1966.

=== Spandau West ===
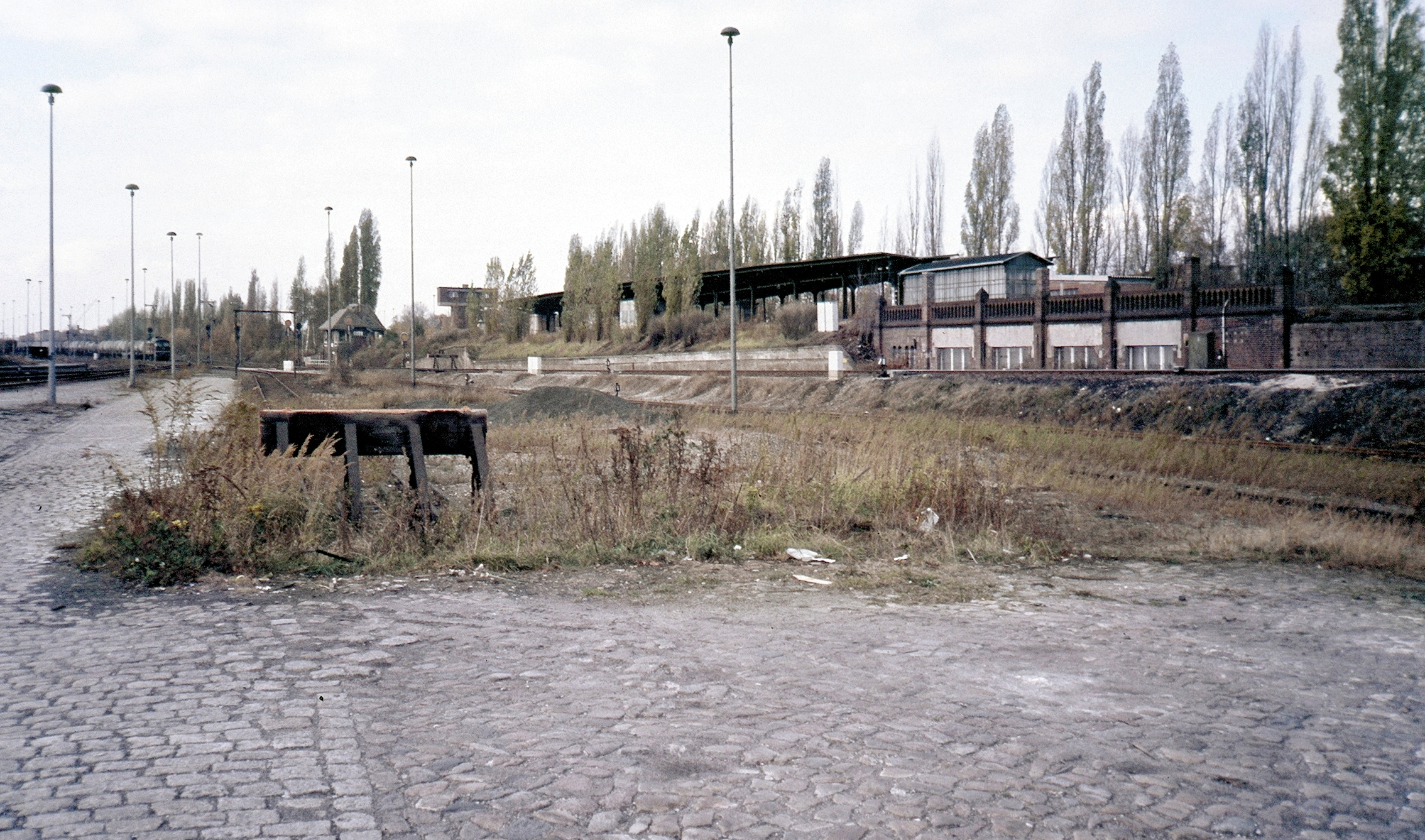
Spandau freight yard and Spandau West S-Bahn station, 1986

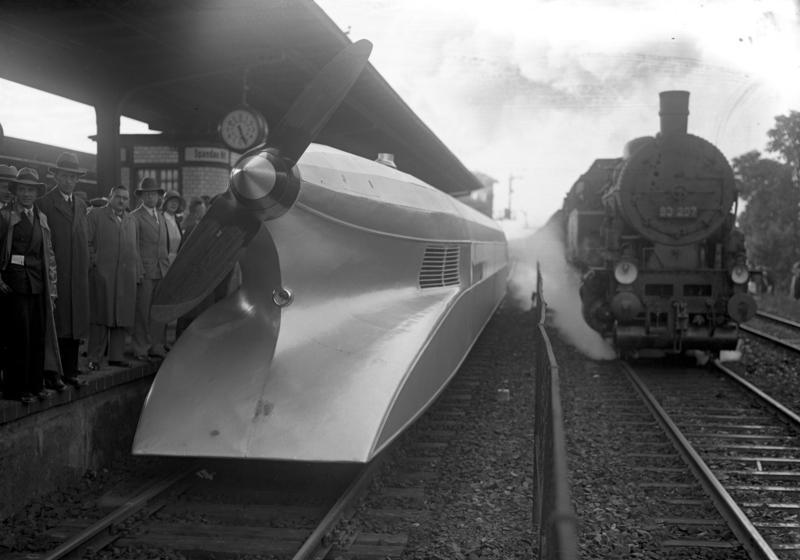
Schienenzeppelin at Spandau Bahnhof in 1931.

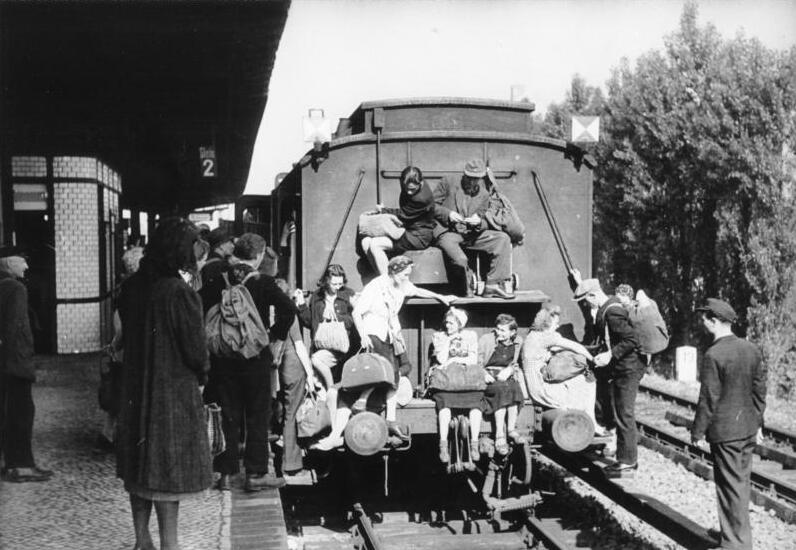
Spandau-West station, 1947: passengers on a crowded train riding on buffers and foot-boards, mostly women foraging for food in the country

This station was opened next to the freight depot on 15 July 1910, originally as Spandau Vorortbahnhof (suburban station). Its name was changed to Spandau West in the same year, about the same time as Hamburger Bahnhof (Spandau station) was renamed Spandau Hauptbahnhof (main station).

The new suburban station was better located than the main station, as it was closer to the Spandau old town (Altstadt) and the new town hall, which was under construction. The platforms were on an embankment and below the tracks at the ends of the platforms there were entrance halls connecting to Galenstraße and also to the intersection of Staakener Straße and Seegefelder Straße, where a subway led to the station of the East Havelland District Railways (Osthavelländische Kreisbahnen).

The station had three tracks next to two platforms, with the regularly-used tracks on either side of an island platform. The Spandau Suburban Line, which connected to the Stadtbahn, ended at the station. The passenger tracks of the Hamburg-Lehrter Bahn (that is the tracks of the lines to Hamburg and Lehrte that had been rebuilt as a single set of tracks between Berlin and Spandau) from Lehrter Stadtbahnhof (Lehrter Stadtbahn station, now part of Berlin Hauptbahnhof) ran as the long-distance lines to the north and the south of the platforms.

The suburban trains from Lehrter Stadtbahn station also crossed over on to the station's passenger tracks and continued to Nauen and Wustermark over the Spandau suburban tracks. To the west of the station was the junction of the tracks of the Hamburg and Lehrte railways, where they formed the suburban and long-distance passenger tracks that ran into Berlin. The Spandau suburban line ended in Spandau at four storage sidings.

The busy flow of commuters between Berlin, Spandau, and towns in the East Havelland at the station compared to the current modest regional service is hard to imagine today. Even after the electrification of the Spandau suburban line from Berlin with the Ringbahn, the Stadtbahn and the suburban railways (referred to as the S-Bahn from 1930), the operation of steam-hauled commuter trains from the Lehrter Stadtbahn station continued.

In the 1930s, the steam-hauled suburban trains ran from Lehrter station to Spandau West station to the end of the electrified line at 10-minute intervals and then continued alternatively to Nauen or Wustermark at 20-minute intervals. Eyewitnesses reported enthusiastically on the interchange between S-Bahn and the suburban railways, because it was possible to interchange quickly and easily on the same platform.

At the current Berlin-Spandau station the complicated arrangements for interchange between the S-Bahn and regional services is an obstacle, which has led to support for the extension of the S-Bahn through Spandau to promote the recovery of commuter traffic and to promote the development of the outskirts.

On 23 August 1928, electric trains ran to Spandau, running over the Spandau Suburban Line rather than using the route of the long-distance trains. It was intended that Spandau West would be a terminus for only a few years as an extension to Wustermark or Falkensee and Nauen was always planned.

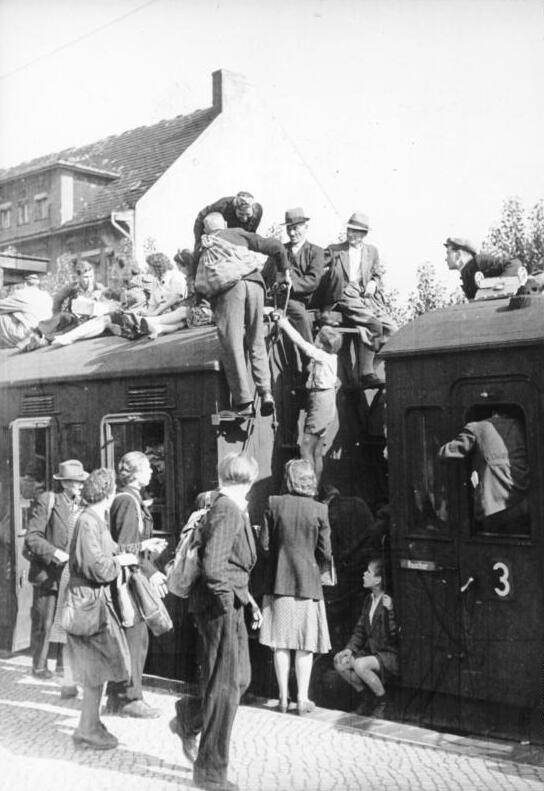
Spandau-West station, 1947

The development scheme planned in the 1930s and 1940s was partially implemented. As of 1951, the first S-Bahn trains continued through Spandau West to Falkensee or along the Lehrter Railway to Staaken. In the opposite direction it was possible to take the S-Bahn to Jungfernheide and the Ringbahn. Simultaneously the Lehrter station in Berlin was closed in 1951. Deutsche Reichsbahn terminated the steam-hauled suburban trains at the S-Bahn terminuses and only S-Bahn trains stopped at Spandau West.

The building of the Berlin Wall on 13 August 1961 affected the station indirectly. The S-Bahn trains to Falkensee were cut back to Spandau West. The S-Bahn service to Staaken was interrupted for several months. Thereafter, the line and thus also the station was affected by the boycott of the S-Bahn by West Berliners. Unneeded infrastructure was exposed to the ravages of time, maintenance was rare as services on the lines were increasingly thinned out. The S-Bahn's low point was reached when the West Berlin-based employees of Deutsche Reichsbahn went on strike from 17 September 1980. Deutsche Reichsbahn did not address the demands of the employees and almost all S-Bahn services in the western part of the city were closed. The Spandau lines, including Spandau West station, were closed on 25 September 1980. The abandoned station was only used by freight trains and passenger trains ran to and from Hamburg on the long-distance tracks without stopping.

=== Berlin-Spandau station ===
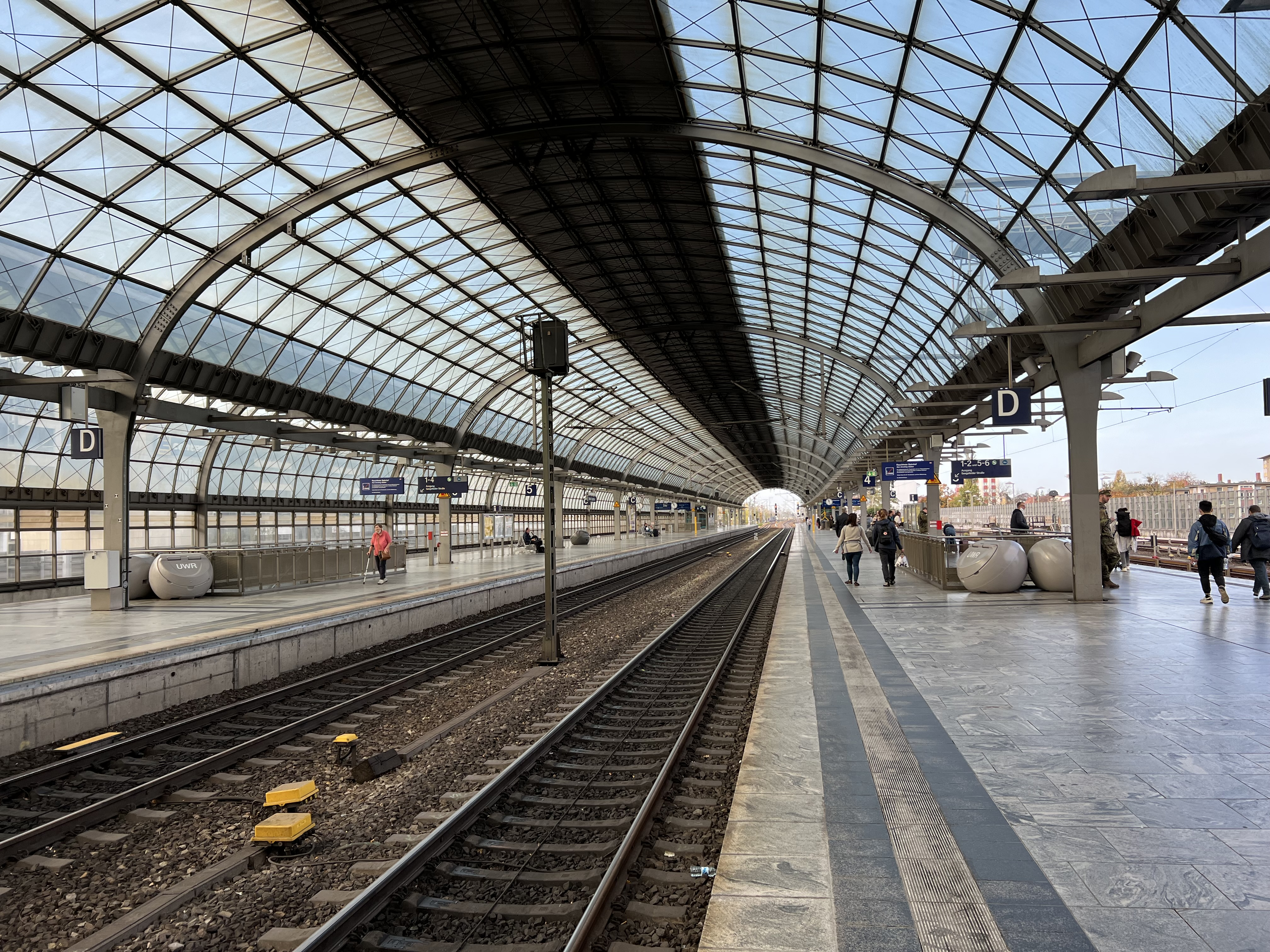
Train shed

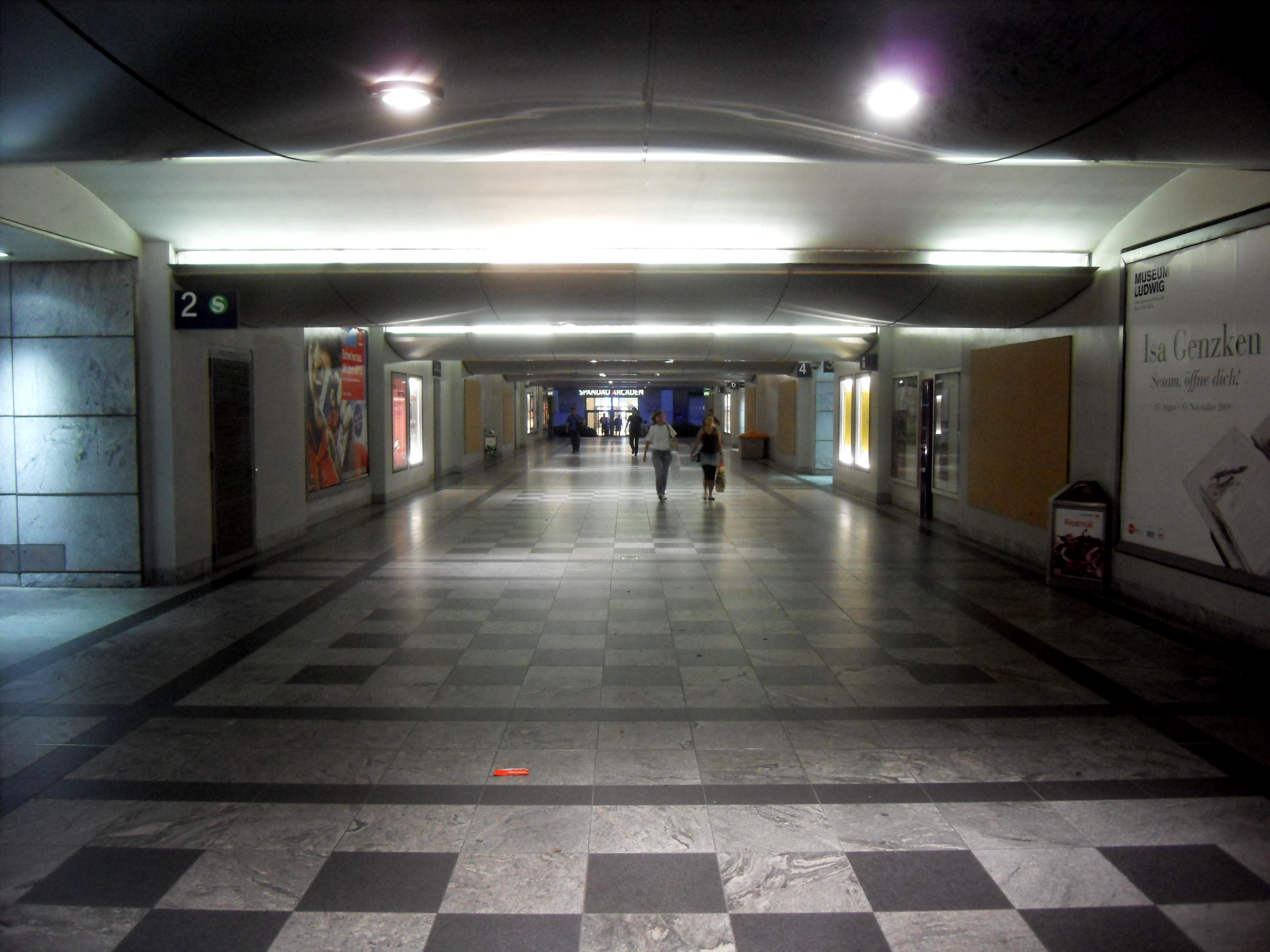
Spandau station subway

The acquisition of the S-Bahn by the Berliner Verkehrsbetriebe on 9 January 1984 was expected to lead to the reopening of the line to Staaken via a new S-Bahn station called Rathaus Spandau (rather than Spandau West). However, this was postponed, as U-Bahn line U7 was completed to Rathaus Spandau (located next to Spandau West station) on 1 October 1984.

The initial plans for the Hanover–Berlin high-speed railway were developed during the same decade. Negotiations with East Germany for what was initially intended as a transit route between West Germany and West Berlin began in autumn 1988. The fall of the Berlin Wall and the completion of negotiations with an agreement on the route in June 1990, gave further impetus to planning.

The transfer of the station from across the Havel (the former Hamburger station, later Spandau Hauptbahnhof) directly to the site near the Old Town and the Town Hall—where in any case the replacement of worn out equipment was necessary—had already been contemplated during the reconstruction of Spandau railway facilities in 1910. It was also proposed to resume S-Bahn services over the Spandau Suburban Line with the option of an extension to the west.

A design of the Spanish architect Santiago Calatrava won a closed urban design competition for the new long-distance and S-Bahn station in 1993. Calatrava imagined that the platforms would be flanked by office buildings—as later implemented for the new Berlin Hauptbahnhof. This was difficult to finance and caused a long controversy over the plan. Finally, the third-ranked design of the German architectural bureau of Gerkan, Marg and Partners was developed between 1996 and 1998 after a review of the original design, which had a roof that was open on both sides. Objections of the passenger associations during the planning approval process achieved a better design for access to the S-Bahn platform.

The first platform of the new Berlin-Spandau station was opened to traffic on 19 May 1997, initially only for long-distance and regional services. S-Bahn services were extended when the train shed was finished on 30 December 1998.

With the completion of the new Berlin railway node on 28 May 2006, the number of daily regional services was reduced from 250 to 212 and the number of long-distance services increased from 66 to 100.

The design of the station has been criticised as inadequate. The station is considered to be part of a congested railway. Passenger trains are only allowed to stop at the platform for a maximum of six minutes between 5 AM and 8 PM. Trains are only allowed to reverse at the platform if either the scheduled stay does not take longer than six minutes or it would use less capacity than to move to a siding.

== Train services ==
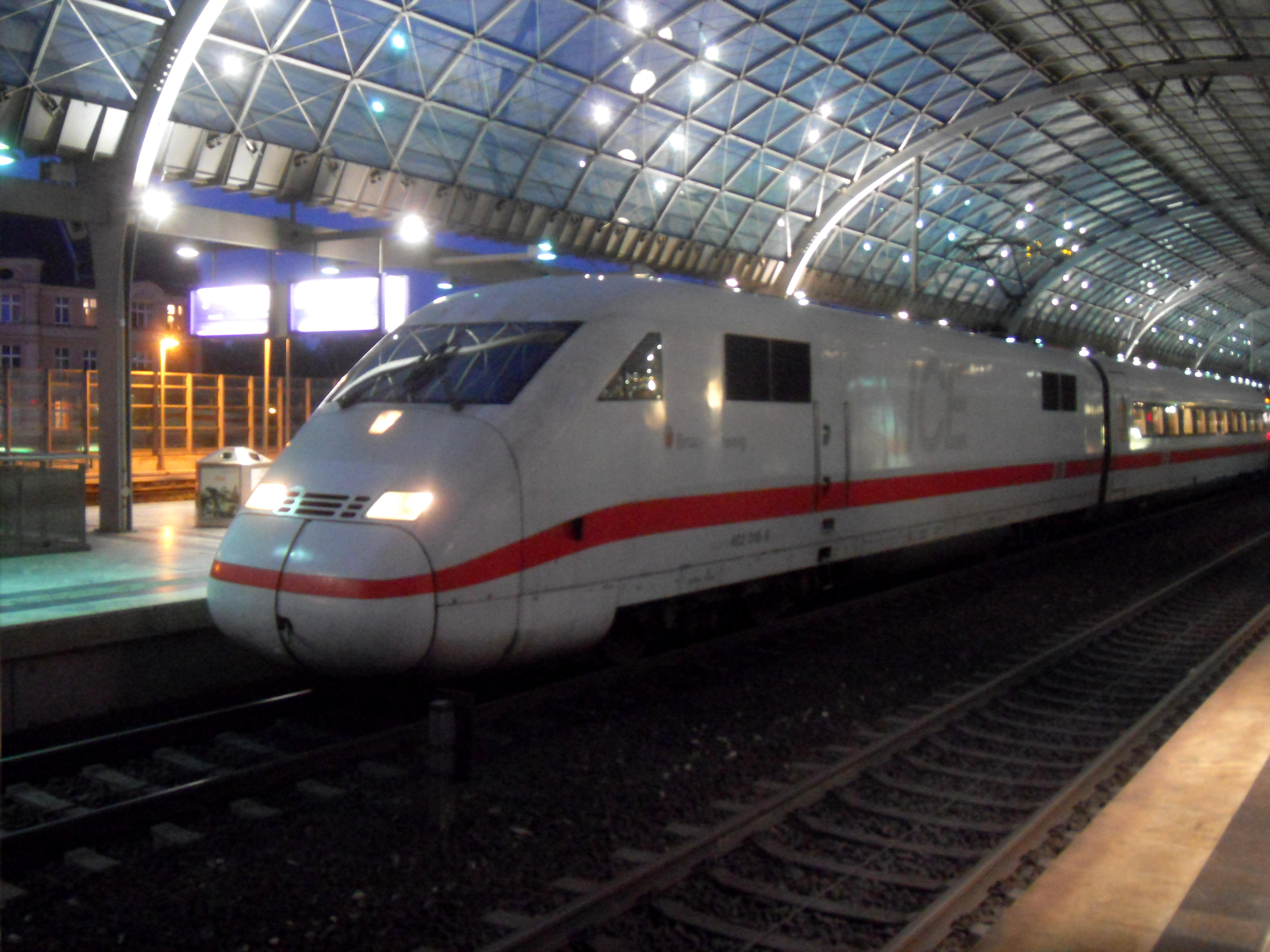
ICE 2 Braunschweig (Tz 18) in Spandau station

The station is served by several Intercity-Express, Intercity and regional services operated by Deutsche Bahn, as well as lines S3 and S9 of the Berlin S-Bahn. The nearby Rathaus Spandau U-Bahn station is served by line U7 and numerous bus routes (including M32, M37 and M45) operated by the Berliner Verkehrsbetriebe and regional bus companies from the surrounding area.

In spring 2006, plans were finalised for an extension of a single-track S-Bahn line to Falkensee. However, its construction depended on financing becoming available. After the 2011 state election, the SPD and the CDU formed a grand coalition. The coalition agreement included a commitment to develop plans to extend the S-Bahn line "from Spandau station to the west to Falkensee".

From April 2026, GoVolta started operating long distance trains from Amsterdam, stopping on Amersfoort, Deventer and Hengelo in the Netherlands and on Osnabrück and Hannover in Germany. Until June they operate three times a week (departures and returns on Tuesdays, Thursdays and Sundays); from July until September, it will operate daily trains.

In the 2026 timetable the following lines stop at the station:

=== Long distance ===
Line	Route			Interval
ICE 3	Saarbrücken – Kaiserslautern – Mannheim –	Frankfurt – Berlin-Spandau – Berlin Hbf – Berlin Südkreuz		Every 4 hours
ICE 3	Frankfurt Airport Regional –	Frankfurt – Berlin-Spandau – Berlin Hbf – Berlin Südkreuz		Every 4 hours
ICE 9	Bonn – Cologne – Berlin-Spandau – Berlin Hbf –		Berlin Südkreuz	Every 6 hours
ICE 9	Bonn – Cologne – Berlin-Spandau – Berlin Hbf –		Berlin Ostbahnhof	Every 6 hours
ICE 10	Cologne –	Düsseldorf – Duisburg – Essen – Bochum – Dortmund –	Hamm – Hanover – Wolfsburg – Berlin-Spandau – Berlin Hbf – Berlin Ostbahnhof	Hourly
ICE 10	Cologne –	Wuppertal – Hagen –	Hamm – Hanover – Wolfsburg – Berlin-Spandau – Berlin Hbf – Berlin Ostbahnhof	Hourly
ICE 12	Switzerland – Basel SBB – Freiburg – Karlsruhe – Mannheim – Frankfurt – Kassel – Braunschweig – Wolfsburg – Berlin-Spandau – Berlin Hbf – Berlin Ostbahnhof			Every 2 hours
ICE 13	Stuttgart –	Heidelberg – Darmstadt –	Frankfurt South – Kassel – Braunschweig – Wolfsburg – Berlin-Spandau – Berlin Hbf – Berlin Ostbahnhof	Every 2 hours
ICE 13	Karlsruhe –	Heidelberg – Darmstadt –	Frankfurt South – Kassel – Braunschweig – Wolfsburg – Berlin-Spandau – Berlin Hbf – Berlin Ostbahnhof	Every 2 hours
ICE 13	Frankfurt Airport –		Frankfurt South – Kassel – Braunschweig – Wolfsburg – Berlin-Spandau – Berlin Hbf – Berlin Ostbahnhof	Every 2 hours
ICE 14	Aachen – Cologne – Düsseldorf – Essen –	Bochum – Dortmund – Hamm – Bielefeld –	Hanover – Berlin-Spandau – Berlin Hbf – Berlin Ostbahnhof	Every 2 hours
ICE 14	Aachen – Cologne – Düsseldorf – Essen –	Münster – Osnabrück –	Hanover – Berlin-Spandau – Berlin Hbf – Berlin Ostbahnhof	Every 2 hours
ICE 16	Oldenburg – Bremen – Hanover – Berlin-Spandau – Berlin Hbf – Berlin Südkreuz			Every four hours
ICE 18	Hamburg – Berlin-Spandau – Berlin Hbf – Halle – Erfurt – Nuremberg – Augsburg – Munich			Every 2 hours
ICE 19	Berlin East – Berlin Hbf – Berlin-Spandau – Hanover – Bielefeld – Hagen – Wuppertal – Cologne (– Bonn – Koblenz – Mainz – Mannheim – Heidelberg – Stuttgart)			Every 2 hours
RJ 27	Hamburg-Altona/Copenhagen/Kiel – Hamburg – Berlin-Spandau – Berlin Hbf – Dresden – Prague (– Brno – Budapest/Vienna)			5 train pairs
ICE 28	Hamburg-Altona – Hamburg – Berlin-Spandau – Berlin Hbf – Leipzig – Erfurt – Nuremberg – Munich			Every 2 hours
ICE 77	Berlin Ostbahnhof – Berlin-Spandau – Hannover – Osnabrück –	– Bad Bentheim – Amersfoort – Amsterdam		Every 2 hours
ICE 77	Berlin Ostbahnhof – Berlin-Spandau – Hannover – Osnabrück –	– Münster		1 early service from Münster
ICE 91	Hamburg-Altona – Berlin Spandau – Berlin Hbf – Halle – Erfurt – Nuremberg – Passau – Linz – Vienna			Two train pairs
FLX 11	Berlin – Berlin-Spandau – Stendal – Wolfsburg – Hannover Messe/Laatzen – Göttingen – Kassel-Wilhelmshöhe – Fulda – Frankfurt Airport – Mainz			Some trains
FLX 30	Leipzig – Berlin Südkreuz – Berlin Hbf – Berlin-Spandau – Stendal – Hannover – Bielefeld – Dortmund – Essen – Duisburg – Düsseldorf – Cologne – Aachen			Some trains
FLX 35	Berlin – Berlin-Spandau – Stendal – Lüneburg – Hamburg-Harburg – Hamburg			Some trains
GoVolta	Amsterdam Centraal – Amersfoort Centraal – Deventer – Hengelo – Osnabrück – Hannover – Berlin-Spandau			3x week (Apr–Jun); 1x day (Jul–Sep)

=== Regional services ===
Line	Route
RE 2	Nauen – Berlin-Spandau – Berlin Zoologischer Garten – Berlin Hbf – Berlin Ostbahnhof – Königs Wusterhausen – Lübben (Spreewald) – Cottbus
RE 4	(Stendal –) Rathenow – Wustermark – Berlin-Spandau – Berlin Hbf – Berlin Potsdamer Platz – Berlin Südkreuz – Ludwigsfelde – Jüterbog – (Falkenberg (Elster))
RE 6	Berlin-Charlottenburg – Berlin-Spandau – Hennigsdorf – Neuruppin – Wittstock (Dosse) – Pritzwalk – Wittenberge
RE 8	Wismar – Schwerin – Wittenberge – Nauen – Berlin-Spandau – Berlin Hbf – Potsdamer Platz – Südkreuz – Wünsdorf-Waldstadt – Luckau-Uckro – Doberlug-Kirchhain – Elsterwerda
RB 10	Nauen – Falkensee – Berlin-Spandau – Berlin Jungfernheide – Berlin Hbf – Berlin Friedrichstraße – Berlin Alexanderplatz – Berlin Ostbahnhof
RB 14	Nauen – Falkensee – Berlin-Spandau – Berlin Zoologischer Garten – Berlin Hbf – Berlin Ostbahnhof
RB 21	Berlin Gesundbrunnen – Berlin Jungfernheide – Berlin-Spandau – Dallgow-Döberitz – Wustermark – Golm – Potsdam

=== Rapid transit ===
Line	Route
S3	Spandau – Westkreuz –Hauptbahnhof – Alexanderplatz – Ostbahnhof – Karlshorst – Köpenick – Erkner
S9	Spandau – Westkreuz – Hauptbahnhof – Alexanderplatz – Ostbahnhof – Schöneweide – Flughafen Berlin Brandenburg

== U-Bahn station ==
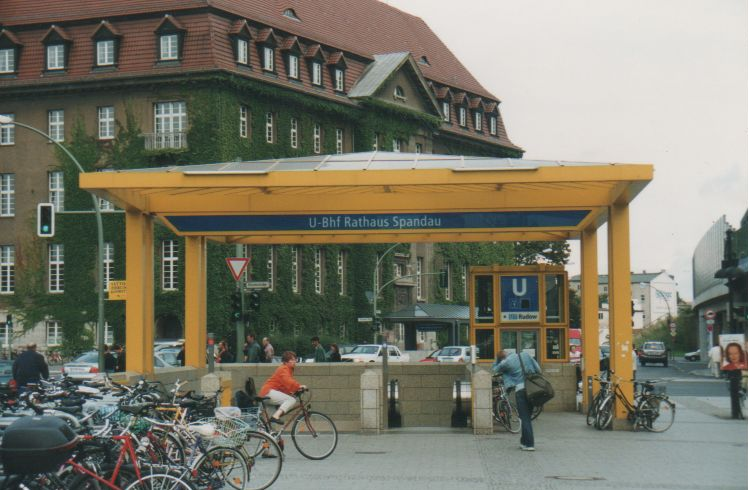
Entrance to the U-Bahn station, which is named after Spandau town hall, seen behind

The Rathaus Spandau U-Bahn station is the western terminus of line U7 the Berlin U-Bahn. It was opened on 1 October 1984. Although the station is very close to Spandau S-Bahn station, it has kept its name. The buses of Berliner Verkehrsbetriebe always show the destination as S+U Rathaus Spandau, although the S-Bahn station is only signed as Spandau.

Line	Route
U7	Rathaus Spandau – Jungfernheide – Bismarckstraße – Wilmersdorfer Straße – Fehrbelliner Platz – Berliner Straße – Bayerischer Platz – Yorckstraße – Möckernbrücke – Mehringdamm – Hermannplatz – Neukölln – Rudow

== See also ==
- Berlin-Staaken station
- Berlin Albrechtshof station
- Rail transport in Germany
