= S3 (Berlin) =

S-Bahn line in Berlin

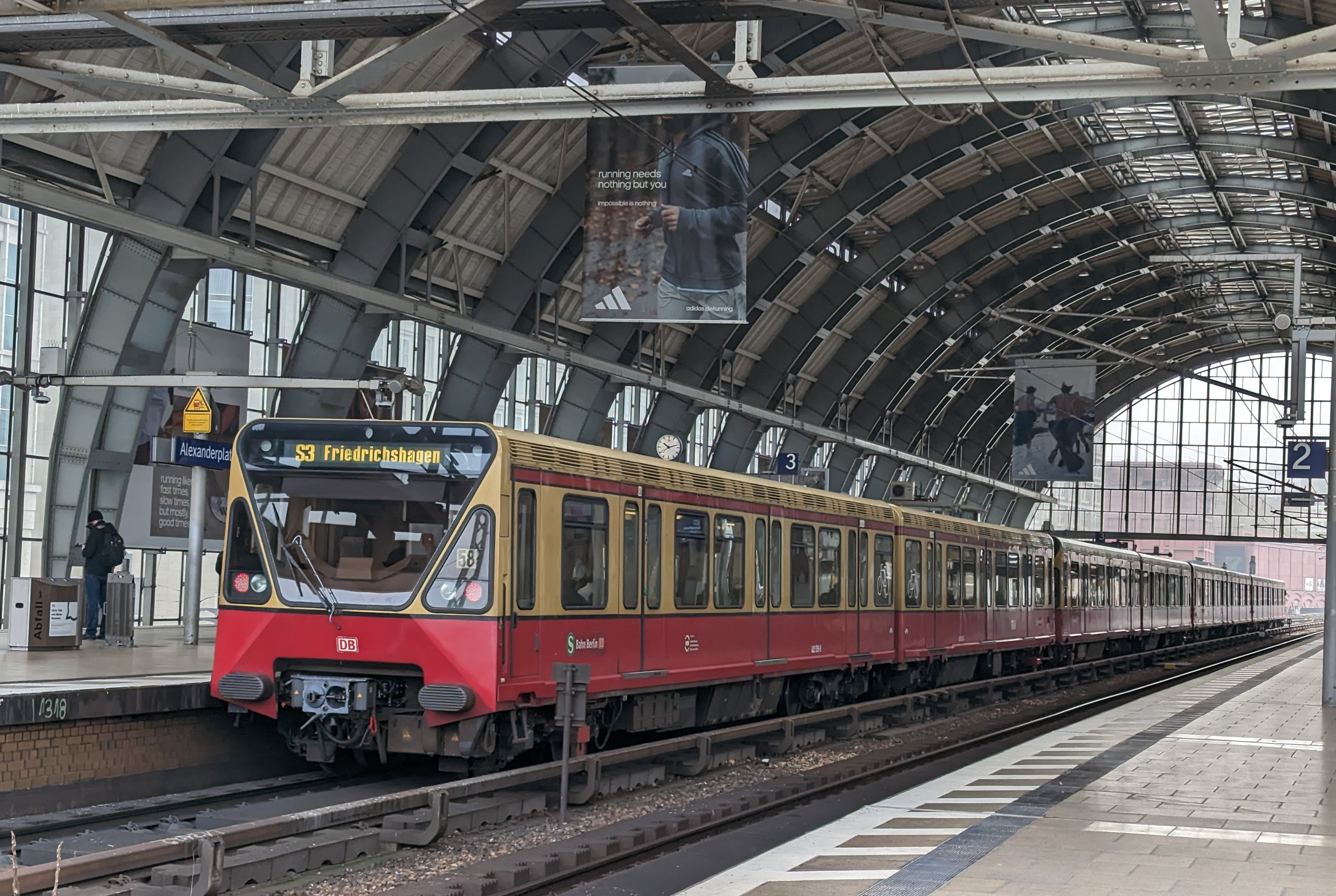

Overview
- Locale: Berlin

Service
- System: Berlin S-Bahn
- Operator(s): S-Bahn Berlin GmbH
- Rolling stock: DBAG Class 481; DBAG Class 480

Technical
- Electrification: 750 V DC Third rail

S3 is a line on the Berlin S-Bahn. It operates from Erkner to Spandau. For most of its existence since becoming a numbered route in 1984, the S3's line has been coloured blue.

S3 originally was shortened to Ostbahnhof from 2003 to 2009 while awaiting renovation works. To compensate for the diminished throughput on the Stadtbahn, the S3 (formerly Erkner ↔ Ostbahnhof) was extended westwards to Spandau. Then, it was temporarily shortened again to Ostkreuz.

== Service history ==
The S3 was created along with the S1 and S2 on 9 January 1984, when the Berliner Verkehrsbetriebe (BVG) took over the S-Bahn network from the East German Deutsche Reichsbahn (DR) in West Berlin: the S3 initially ran between Friedrichstraße and Charlottenburg, before being extended south-westwards to Wannsee on 1 May 1984.

Due to the reunification of Germany, the S3 briefly became a four-coloured line on 1 July 1990, absorbing the DR S-Bahn services formerly terminating at Friedrichstraße to Strausberg Nord (orange), Erkner (yellow), Königs Wusterhausen (green), and Flughafen Berlin Schönefeld (sky blue, now BER Airport – Terminal 5). On 2 June 1991, the S3 was broken-up into the following lines:

Old route		New route	
Line	Termini	Line	Termini
S3 (Strausberg branch)	Westkreuz–Strausberg Nord	S5	Wannsee–Strausberg Nord
S3 (Erkner branch)	Wannsee–Erkner	S3	Unchanged
S3 (Königs Wusterhausen branch)	Wannsee–Königs Wusterhausen	S6	Charlottenburg–Königs Wusterhausen
S3 (Schönefeld Airport branch)	Charlottenburg–Berlin Schönefeld Airport	S9	Westkreuz–Berlin Schönefeld Airport
