= Bad Belzig station =

Railway station in Bad Belzig, Germany

Bad Belzig
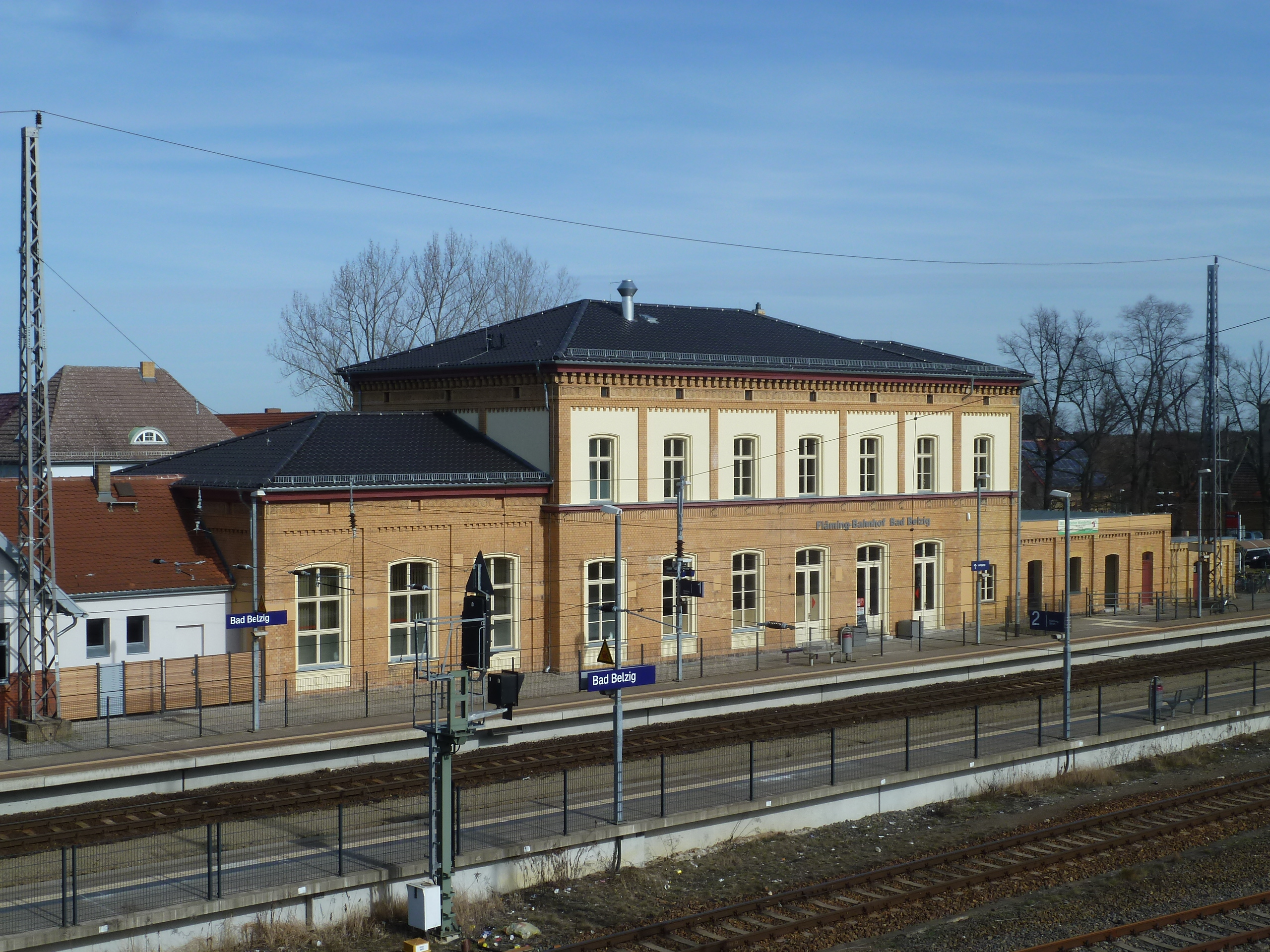
- 2012

General information
- Location: Am Bahnhof 11; 14806 Bad Belzig; Brandenburg; Germany
- Coordinates: 52.1362°N 12.5952°E
- Owner: DB Netz
- Operator: DB Station&Service
- Lines: Berlin-Blankenheim railway (KBS 207); Brandenburg Towns Railway (KBS 209.51)
- Platforms: 2 side platforms
- Tracks: 2
- Train operators: DB Regio Nordost

Other information
- Station code: 478
- DS100 code: BBIG
- IBNR: 8010031
- Category: 5
- Fare zone: : 6443
- Website: www.bahnhof.de

History
- Opened: 15 May 1879; 147 years ago

Services
Preceding station	DB Regio Nordost	Following station
Wiesenburg (Mark) towards Dessau Hbf	RE 7	Baitz towards Senftenberg
Location
- Location within Brandenburg

Bad Belzig station is a railway station in the spa town of Bad Belzig, located in the Potsdam-Mittelmark district in Brandenburg, Germany.
