= Hegermühle station =

Railway station in Germany

Coordinates: 52.5488°N 13.8666°E

Hegermühle
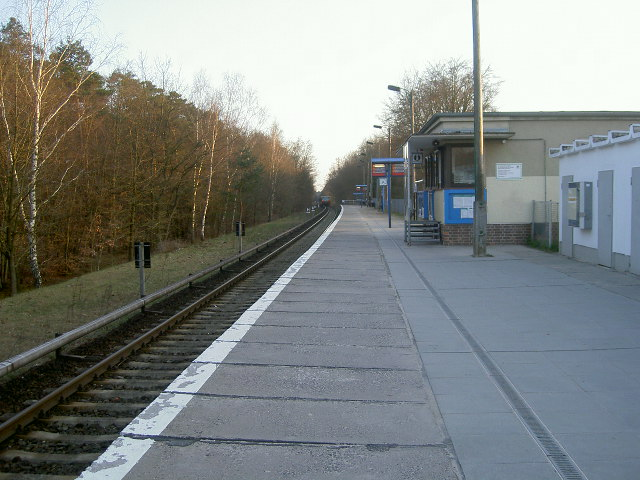
- Station building

General information
- Other names: Strausberg-Hegermühle
- Location: Am Herrensee; 15344 Strausberg; Brandenburg; Germany
- Owner: DB Netz
- Operator: DB Station&Service
- Lines: Strausberg–Strausberg Nord railway (KBS 200.5)
- Platforms: 1 side platform
- Tracks: 1
- Train operators: S-Bahn Berlin
- Connections: S5

Other information
- Station code: 2622
- DS100 code: BHGM
- IBNR: 8080680
- Category: 6
- Fare zone: VBB: Berlin C/5462
- Website: www.bahnhof.de

History
- Opened: 5 October 1984; 41 years ago

Services
| Preceding station | Berlin S-Bahn | Following station |
|---|---|---|
| Strausberg towards Westkreuz | S5 | Strausberg Stadt towards Strausberg Nord |
Location

Hegermühle is a railway station in the city of Strausberg in Brandenburg. Located on the Strausberg–Strausberg Nord line, it is served by the S-Bahn line S5.

== History ==
The Hegermühle halt was opened on 5 October 1984 to serve the newly created settlements in the south of the city of Strausberg. The name of the station is derived from one of the wind and water mills built around Strausberg in the 13th and 14th centuries, as well as the station of the same name and the Schlagmühle station of the Strausberger Eisenbahn.

The trains on the line should originally be handled by video surveillance from Strausberg Stadt station, but this was not possible due to technical defects. Between Strausberg Nord station and Strausberg station there was therefore a mobile supervisor on each train. In the years 1989 to 1991, a public office building for train protection systems was built at the station, also to prevent vandalism. Since then, there has been no mobile supervision on the track anymore.

== Notable places nearby ==
- Herrensee

== See also ==
- Strausberg Railway
- Straussee Ferry
- Strausberg station
- Strausberg Stadt station
- Strausberg Nord station
