= S6 (Berlin) =

Overview
- Locale: Berlin

Service
- System: Berlin S-Bahn
- Operator(s): S-Bahn Berlin GmbH

Technical
- Electrification: 750 V DC Third rail

The S6 was a line number used by the Berlin S-Bahn from June 1991 until June 2002. The line always ran to the south-east corner of Berlin, although a number of routings were used during its period of operation. The line was replaced by the S46 and S9 which now provide connections to south-east Berlin.

== Service history ==
The S6 was created on 2 June 1991, as a shorter replacement of the Green route of the S3 between Charlottenburg and Königs Wusterhausen.

A year later, the line was extended by one station to Westkreuz. In May 1994, the line was shortened to act as a peak-time shuttle between Warschauer Straße and Zeuthen. The line was removed in June 2002.

== Route ==
The station listing below provides an overview of what the line looked like. The possible travel connections are correct for the period of operation and do not reflect the current travel connections for these stations.

- Königs Wusterhausen (DB) (Not served after May 1994)
- Wildau (Not served after May 1994)
- Zeuthen (S46)
- Eichwalde
- Grünau (S8)
- Adlershof (S45) (S9)
- Betriebsbahnhof Schöneweide / Johanissthal (Present Day)
- Schöneweide (S85) (S86) (DB)
- Baumschulenweg (S45) (S46) (S86)
- Plänterwald
- Treptower Park (S4)
- Ostkreuz (S3) (S4) (S5) (S7) (S75) (S8) (S85)
- Warschauer Straße (U1) (S75)
- Hauptbahnhof (Now Ostbahnhof) (DB) (S86) (Not served after May 1994)
- Jannowitzbrücke (U8) (Not served after May 1994)
- Alexanderplatz (U2) (U5) (U8) (DB) (Not served after May 1994)
- Hackescher Markt (Not served after May 1994)
- Friedrichstraße (U6) (S1) (S2) (DB) (Not served after May 1994)
- Lehrter Stadtbahnhof (Not served after May 1994)
- Bellevue (Not served after May 1994)
- Tiergarten (Not served after May 1994)
- Zoologischer Garten (U2) (U9) (DB) (Not served after May 1994)
- Savignyplatz (Not served after May 1994)
- Charlottenburg (U7) (S5) (DB) (Not served after May 1994)
- Westkreuz (S3) (S45) (S46) (S7) (S9) (Only served between May 1992 and May 1994)
