= S10 (Berlin) =

Line of the Berlin S-Bahn

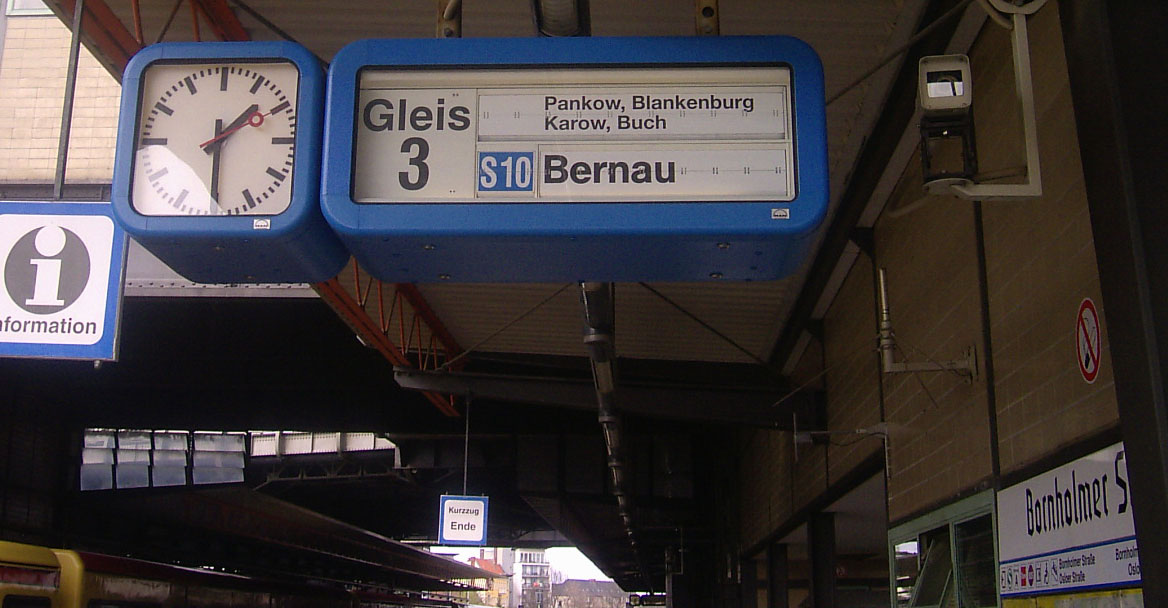

Overview
- Locale: Berlin

Service
- System: Berlin S-Bahn
- Operator(s): S-Bahn Berlin GmbH

Technical
- Electrification: 750 V DC Third rail

The S10 was a line number used by the Berlin S-Bahn from June 1991 until December 1999. The line operated solely in the former East Berlin and was replaced by the S8 for the northern part of the route and the S47/S9 for the southern routing.

== Service history ==
The S10 was created on 2 June 1991, replacing the Navy Blue route of the East Berlin S-Bahn between Oranienburg and Flughafen Berlin Schönefeld (now BER Airport – Terminal 5, via the eastern part of the Ringbahn).

With the re-construction of the direct line between Frohnau and Oranienburg for the S1, the S10 terminated at Birkenwerder from May 1992. The line was redirected to Spindlersfeld from Schönefeld International Airport in May 1993, which remained the routing until the line was withdrawn in December 1999.

== Route ==
The station listing below provides an overview of what the line looked like. The possible travel connections are correct for the period of operation and do not reflect the current travel connections for these stations.

Common Route (in service from June 1991 to December 1999):

- Birkenwerder (S1) (DB)
- Hohen Neuendorf (S1)
- Bergfelde
- Schönfließ
- Mühlenbeck-Mönchmühle
- Blankenburg (S4) (S8)
- Pankow-Heinersdorf
- Pankow
- Bornholmer Straße (S1) (S2) (S25)
- Schönhauser Allee (U2) (S8)
- Prenzlauer Allee
- Greifswalder Straße
- Landsberger Allee
- Storkower Straße
- Frankfurter Allee (U5)
- Ostkreuz (S3) (S5) (S6) (S7) (S75) (S9)
- Treptower Park (S4)
- Plänterwald
- Baumschulenweg (S45) (S46)
- Schöneweide (S45) (S46) (S6) (S8) (S9) (DB)

Northern Extension to Oranienburg (in service from June 1991 until May 1992):

- Borgsdorf
- Lehnitz
- Oranienburg (DB)

Southern Extension to Flughafen Schönefeld (in service from June 1991 until May 1993):

- Betriebsbahnhof Schöneweide
- Adlershof (S6) (S8)
- Altglienicke
- Grünbergallee
- Flughafen Schönefeld (S9) (DB)

Southern Re-routing to Spindlersfeld (in service from May 1993 until December 1999):

- Oberspree
- Spindlersfeld
