= Strausberg Stadt station =

Railway station in Germany

Coordinates: 52.5766°N 13.8878°E

Strausberg Stadt
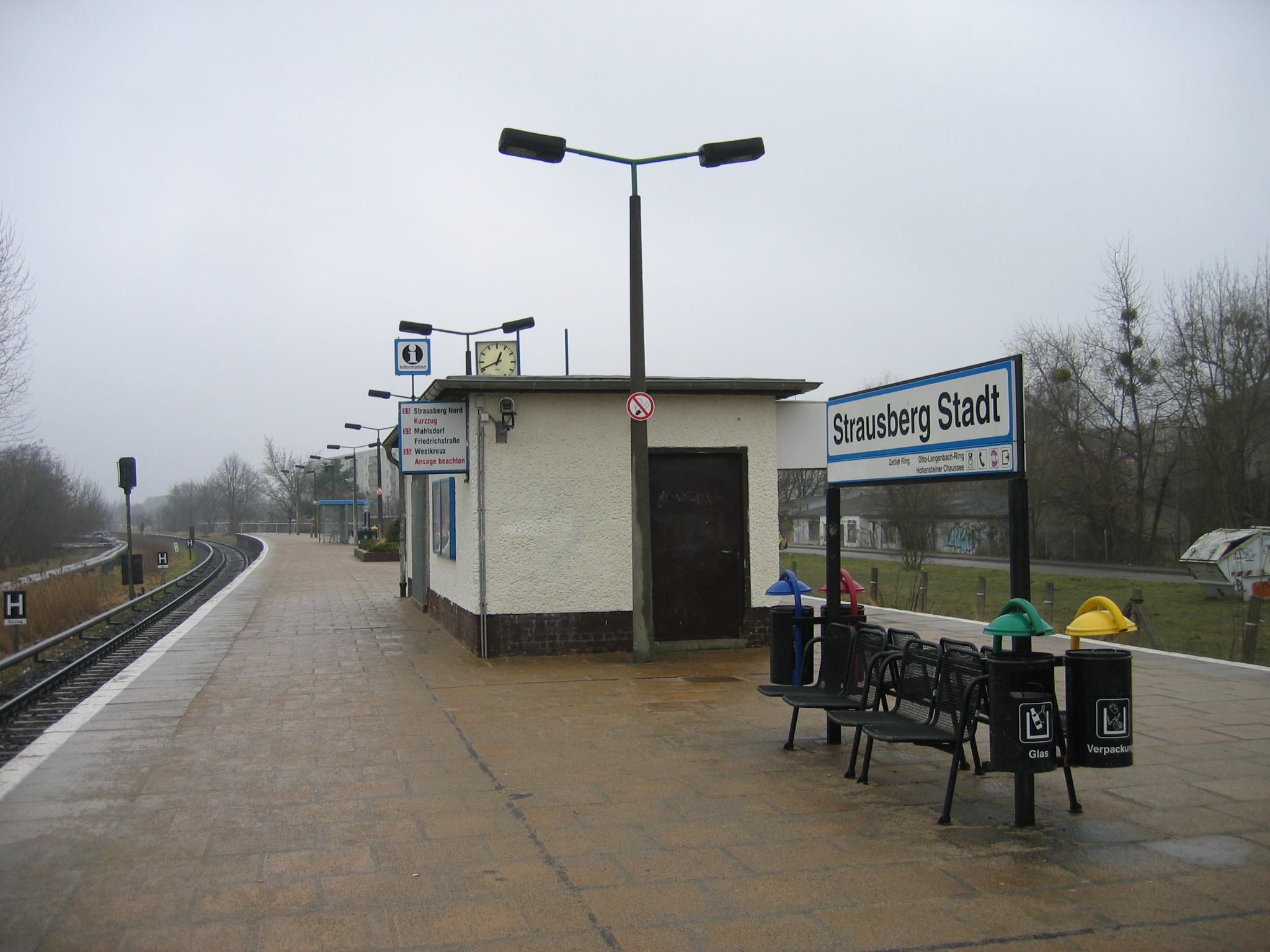
- Station building

General information
- Location: Josef-Zettler-Ring; 15344 Strausberg; Brandenburg; Germany
- Owner: DB Netz
- Operator: DB Station&Service
- Lines: Strausberg–Strausberg Nord railway (KBS 200.5)
- Platforms: 1 side platform
- Tracks: 1
- Train operators: S-Bahn Berlin
- Connections: 923 926 927 929 931 937 947 966

Other information
- Station code: 6060
- DS100 code: BSTR
- IBNR: 8081420
- Category: 6
- Fare zone: VBB: Berlin C/5462
- Website: www.bahnhof.de

History
- Opened: 3 June 1956; 70 years ago

Services
Preceding station	Berlin S-Bahn	Following station
Hegermühle towards Westkreuz	S5	Strausberg Nord Terminus
Location

Strausberg Stadt is a railway station in the city of Strausberg in Brandenburg. Located on the Strausberg–Strausberg Nord line, it is served by the S-Bahn line S5.

== History ==
Strausberg Stadt station exists since the track opening. The station has a track on an uncovered side platform, which is accessible at ground level barrier-free. Originally, instead of the side platform, an island platform between two tracks was planned. However, this was not implemented as the planned double-track line was not realized.

The reception building is a small low-rise building. The city intends to acquire the station building for around 25,000 euros, in order to subsequently remodel the area and the connection to the historic old town of Strausberg.

== Notable places nearby ==
- Straussee
- Strausberg Airfield

== See also ==
- Strausberg Railway
- Straussee Ferry
- Strausberg station
- Strausberg Hegermühle station
- Strausberg Nord station
