= S86 (Berlin) =

Former Berlin S-Bahn line

Overview
- Locale: Berlin

Service
- System: Berlin S-Bahn
- Operator(s): S-Bahn Berlin GmbH

Technical
- Electrification: 750 V DC Third rail

The S86 was a line number used by the Berlin S-Bahn.

== Service history ==
This line number has been associated with four different routes during the last fifteen years.

The first version of the S86 was created on 2 June 1991, replacing the Brown route of the East Berlin S-Bahn between Buch and Warschauer Straße (via the eastern part of the Ringbahn).

The line was altered in May 1993 to run between Pankow and Hauptbahnhof (now Ostbahnhof), before being abolished in May 1994.

The line re-appeared as a night-time shuttle between Hermannstraße and Spindlersfeld in December 1999 before being removed again in June 2002. The line was re-introduced temporarily during construction works between September 2005 and May 2006.

Currently there are plans to again re-introduce the line as a permanent addition between Buch and Grünau replacing the S26 and S85, which will only happen if the S85 starts service towards the Central Station (Berlin Hauptbahnhof).

== Warschauer Straße to Buch ==
This service ran for two years and provided an increased daytime service between Warschauer Straße and Buch. The line was extensively altered in May 1993 which effectively removed most of this service. The station listing below provides an overview of what the line looked like. The possible travel connections are correct for the period of operation and do not reflect the current travel connections for these stations.

- Warschauer Straße(S3) (S5) (S6) (S7) (S75) (S9)
- Ostkreuz (S3) (S5) (S6) (S7) (S75) (S8) (S85) (S9) (S10)
- Frankfurter Allee (U5)
- Storkower Straße
- Landsberger Allee
- Greifswalder Straße
- Prenzlauer Allee
- Schönhauser Allee (U2)
- Bornholmer Straße (S1) (S2)
- Pankow
- Pankow-Heinersdorf
- Blankenburg (S85) (S10)
- Karow (DB)
- Buch (S8)

== Hauptbahnhof to Pankow ==
In May 1993, the line was extended by one station to the Hauptbahnhof (now Ostbahnhof) with the northern section cut back to Pankow. This revised line existed for a single year when the line disappeared off the maps for a period of five years. The station listing below provides an overview of what the line looked like. The possible travel connections are correct for the period of operation and do not reflect the current travel connections for these stations.

- Hauptbahnhof (now Ostbahnhof) (S3) (S5) (S6) (S7) (S9)
- Warschauer Straße (S75)
- Ostkreuz (S3) (S5) (S6) (S7) (S75) (S8) (S9) (S10)
- Frankfurter Allee (U5)
- Storkower Straße
- Landsberger Allee
- Greifswalder Straße
- Prenzlauer Allee
- Schönhauser Allee (U2)
- Bornholmer Straße (S1) (S2)
- Pankow (S8) (S10)

== S86: Night line ==
In December 1999, the line re-appeared as a night-time shuttle service between Spindlersfeld and Hermannstraße. This short line ran between 9pm and 4am to provide Spindlersfeld with a link to the network when the (S85) finished for the night. The line lasted until June 2002 when the new (S47) line started serving Spindlersfeld both day and night rendering the S86 obsolete. The station listing below provides an overview of what the line looked like. The possible travel connections are correct for the period of operation and do not reflect the current travel connections for these stations.

- Spindlersfeld
- Oberspree
- Schöneweide (S45) (S46) (S6) (S8) (S9) (DB)
- Baumschulenweg (S6) (S8) (S9)
- Köllnische Heide
- Neukölln (U7) (S4)
- Hermannstraße (U8) (S4) (S45) (S46)

== Nordbahnhof to Birkenwerder ==
During major construction works at Pankow station and in the north–south tunnel between September 2005 and May 2006, the S86 operated between Nordbahnhof and Birkenwerder to maintain a service to the outer railway ring stations. The line joined with the (S26) at Nordbahnhof for three weeks to provide a through service to Teltow Stadt from 8 May 2006 until 27 May 2006. The possible travel connections are correct for the period of operation and do not reflect the current travel connections for these stations.

- Nordbahnhof (S1) (S2) (S25)
- Humboldthain
- Gesundbrunnen (U8) (S4x) (S45) (S46) (S47)
- Bornholmer Straße (S1) (S25) (S8) (S85)
- Pankow (U2)
- Pankow-Heinersdorf
- Blankenburg (S2)
- Mühlenbeck-Mönchmühle
- Schönfließ
- Bergfelde
- Hohen Neuendorf (S1)
- Birkenwerder (S1)
