= Petershagen Nord station =

Railway station in Petershagen-Eggersdorf, Germany

Coordinates: 52.5291°N 13.7910°E

Petershagen Nord
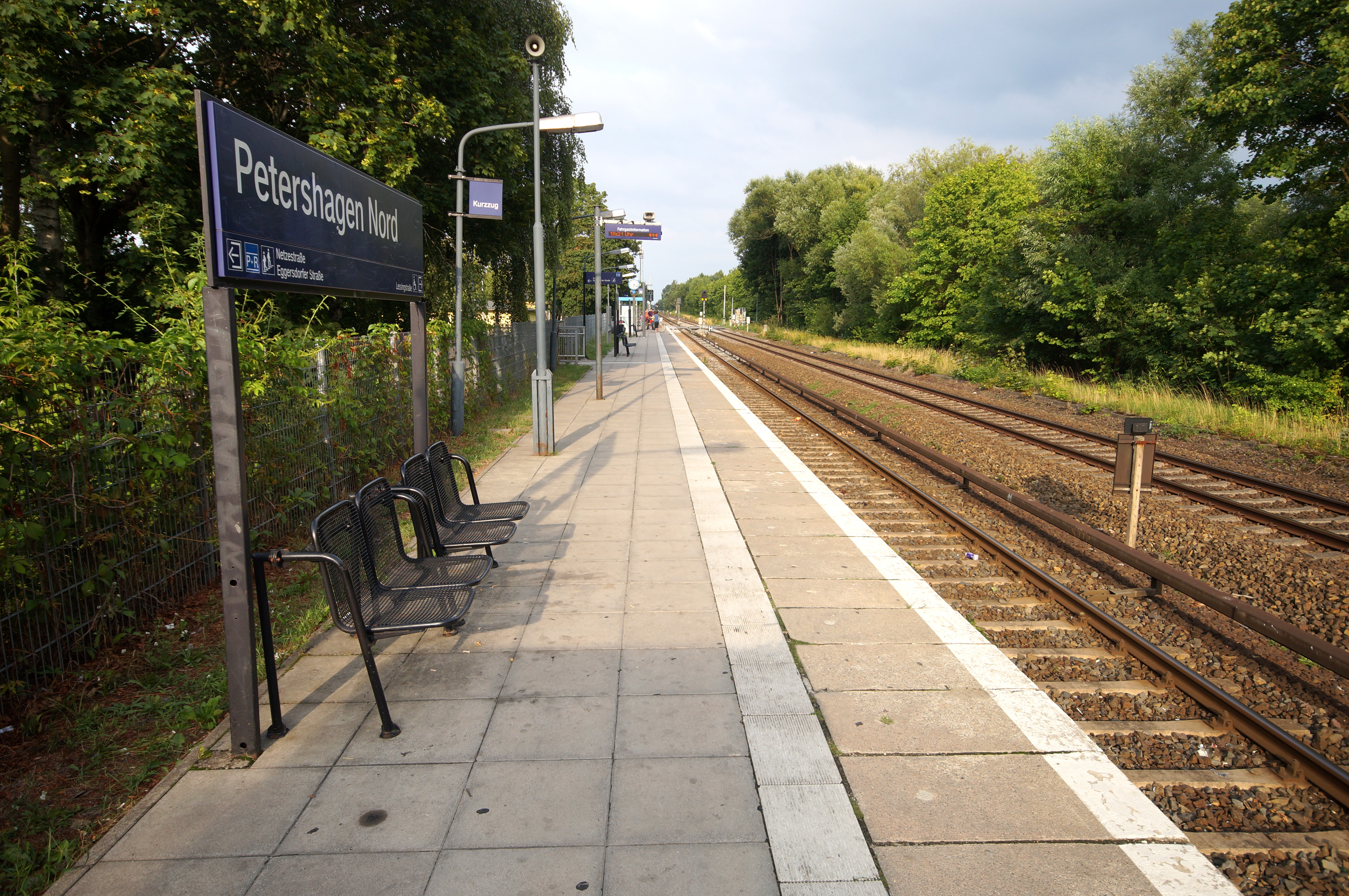

General information
- Location: Petershagen, Petershagen-Eggersdorf, Brandenburg; Germany
- Owner: DB Netz
- Operator: DB Station&Service
- Line: Prussian Eastern Railway
- Platforms: 1
- Tracks: 1
- Train operators: S-Bahn Berlin
- Connections: 931 932 933 948 949 R933

Other information
- Station code: n/a
- Category: 4
- Fare zone: VBB: Berlin C/5561

Services
Preceding station	Berlin S-Bahn	Following station
Fredersdorf towards Westkreuz	S5	Strausberg towards Strausberg Nord
Location

Petershagen Nord (also commonly known as Petershagen) is a railway station located in Petershagen-Eggersdorf, in the Märkisch-Oderland district of Brandenburg. It is served by the S-Bahn line S5.

== Overview ==
The stop, located in north of Petershagen, is so named (P. North) due to the existence of "Petershagen Süd" (P. South), a railway station on a line, now closed, from Fredersdorf to Rüdersdorf.
