= Petershagen-Eggersdorf =

- Municipality
- Coat of arms

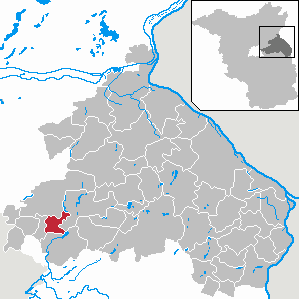
- Location of Petershagen-Eggersdorf within Märkisch-Oderland district
- Interactive map of Petershagen-Eggersdorf
- Location within Germany Location within Brandenburg
- Coordinates: 52°31′45″N 13°47′28″E
- Country: Germany
- State: Brandenburg
- District: Märkisch-Oderland
- Subdivisions: 2 Ortsteile

Government
  - Mayor (2018–26): Marco Rutter (FDP)

Area
  - Total: 17.47 km^{2} (6.75 sq mi)
- Elevation: 52 m (171 ft)

Population (2025-12-31)
  - Total: 15,360
  - Density: 879.2/km^{2} (2,277/sq mi)
- Time zone: UTC+01:00 (CET)
  - Summer (DST): UTC+02:00 (CEST)
- Postal codes: 15370, 15345
- Dialling codes: 033439 and 03341
- Vehicle registration: MOL
- Website: www.petershagen-eggersdorf.de

Petershagen-Eggersdorf is a municipality in the district Märkisch-Oderland, in Brandenburg, Germany.

== Geography ==
The municipality, situated 30 km (19 mi) east of Berlin centre, comprises the main settlements of Petershagen and Eggersdorf.

=== Demography ===
Development of population since 1875 within the current boundaries (blue line: population; dotted line: comparison to population development of Brandenburg state; grey background: time of Nazi rule; red background: time of communist rule)

Recent population development and projections (population development before 2011 census (blue line); recent population development according to the Census in Germany in 2011 (blue bordered line); official projections for 2005-2030 (yellow line); for 2017-2030 (scarlet line); for 2020-2030 (green line)

Petershagen/Eggersdorf: Population development
within the current boundaries (2020)

Year	Pop.	±% p.a.
1875	811	—
1890	809	−0.02%
1910	2,231	+5.20%
1925	4,252	+4.39%
1939	9,068	+5.56%
1950	9,131	+0.06%
1964	9,706	+0.44%

Year	Pop.	±% p.a.
1971	9,871	+0.24%
1981	9,319	−0.57%
1985	9,120	−0.54%
1990	8,442	−1.53%
1995	8,974	+1.23%
2000	11,614	+5.29%
2005	13,171	+2.55%

Year	Pop.	±% p.a.
2010	13,875	+1.05%
2015	14,520	+0.91%
2016	14,719	+1.37%
2017	15,049	+2.24%
2018	15,184	+0.90%
2019	15,327	+0.94%
2020	15,460	+0.87%

== Transport ==
The village is well connected to Berlin by the S-Bahn line S5 at the station of Petershagen Nord. The stop is so named (P. North) due to the existence of "Petershagen Süd" (P. South), a railway station on a line, now closed, from Fredersdorf to Rüdersdorf.

== Twin towns ==
- Petershagen (North Rhine-Westphalia, Germany) - since 1990
