= Fredersdorf station =

Railway station in Germany

Coordinates: 52.5265°N 13.7625°E

Fredersdorf (b Berlin)
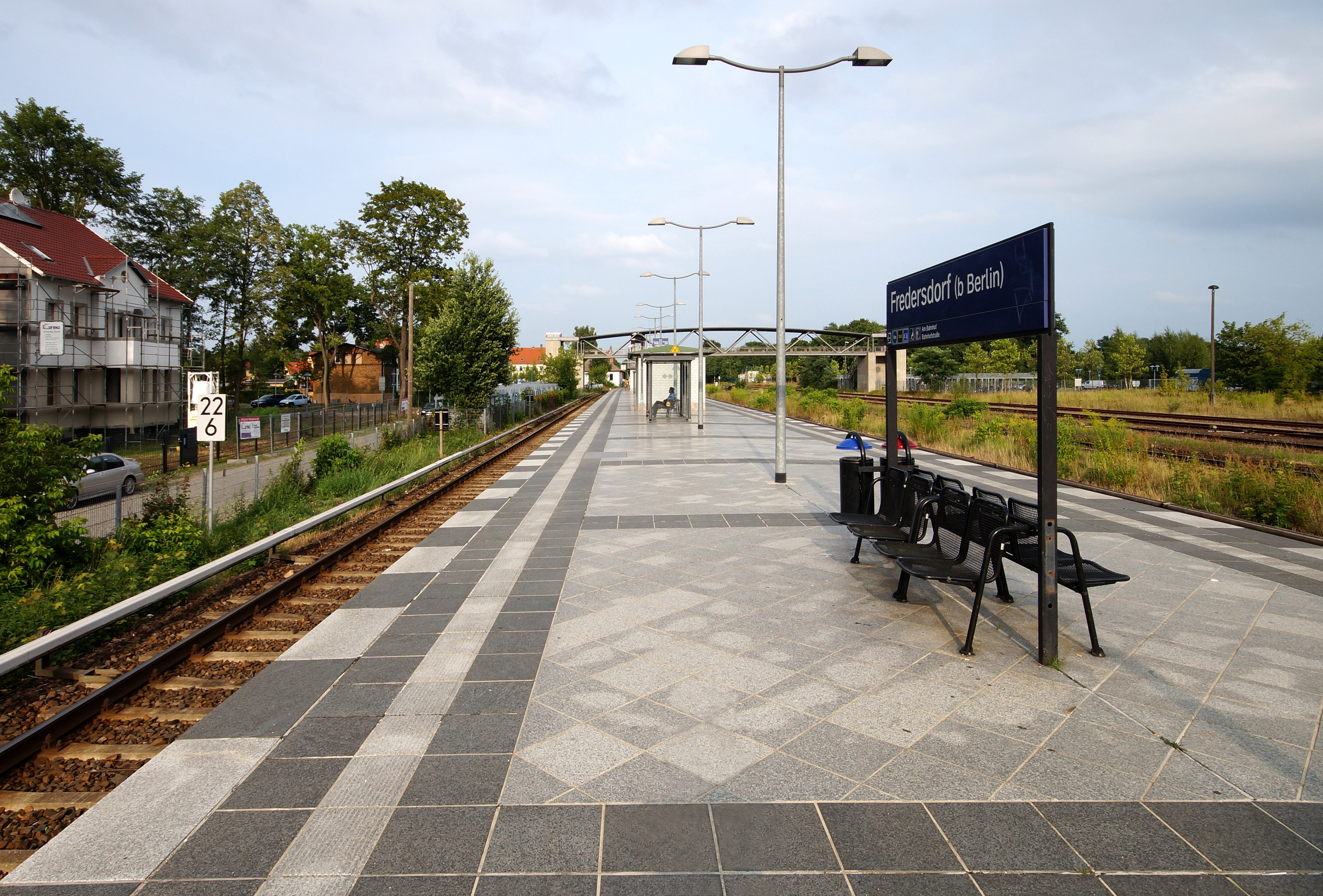

General information
- Location: Fredersdorf, Fredersdorf-Vogelsdorf, Brandenburg; Germany
- Owner: DB Netz
- Operator: DB Station&Service
- Line: Prussian Eastern Railway
- Platforms: 1
- Tracks: 2
- Train operators: S-Bahn Berlin
- Connections: 933 948 949 951

Other information
- Station code: 1889
- DS100 code: BFD
- IBNR: 8080440
- Category: 5
- Fare zone: VBB: Berlin C/5561

Services
| Preceding station | Berlin S-Bahn | Following station |
|---|---|---|
| Neuenhagen towards Westkreuz | S5 | Petershagen Nord towards Strausberg Nord |
Location

Fredersdorf is a railway station located in Fredersdorf-Vogelsdorf, in the Märkisch-Oderland district of Brandenburg. It is served by the S-Bahn line S5.

== Location ==
The train station is located in the Fredersdorf district, approx. 300 m east of the town centre. It borders on Am Bahnhof, Bahnhofstrasse and Brückenstrasse. Neuenhagen (b Berlin) station is around 4 km to the west and Petershagen Nord station is around 2 km east. The station belongs to the Berlin C tariff area of the Berlin-Brandenburg transport association.

== History ==
=== History up to World War II ===
After the station was opened on September 15, 1872, it was initially called Petershagen. Since January 1, 1875, it was called Fredersdorf and, because a line branched off to Rüdersdorf, had a middle and a side platform. On May 1, 1911, the name was changed to Bahnhof Fredersdorf (Niederbarnim district). The power rails on the Ostbahn initially only reached as far as Kaulsdorf. There were already plans for further electrification of the line, but these were not implemented. With the commissioning of special suburban tracks, a new island platform was created in August 1944, which was very narrow and not covered. A wooden bridge provided access to the new platform.

=== History from 1945 to 1990 ===
At the end of April 1945 the train service was stopped, but reopened on September 10 of the same year. Many tracks on the line had been dismantled because they were urgently needed on the line to Erkner. On September 1, 1948, the S-Bahn was electrified to Fredersdorf. The station was the terminus for a short time, but on October 31, 1948, the S-Bahn line was extended to Strasbourg. The temporary substation for the power supply near Neuenhagen has been replaced by a permanent local substation in Fredersdorf. Passenger traffic on the branch line from Fredersdorf station to Rüdersdorf was stopped on May 30, 1965, making access to one of the side platforms superfluous. It was shortened and only replaced by a steel bridge in December 1987. In 1988 a new signal box was built.

=== History after 1990 ===
From June to December 2004 a new pedestrian bridge and three elevators were built to make the station accessible. The client was the community of Fredersdorf-Vogelsdorf. Numerous engineering offices and companies were involved in the planning and construction. The construction was financed by the state of Brandenburg.
