= Strausberg station =

Railway station in Strausberg, Germany

Strausberg
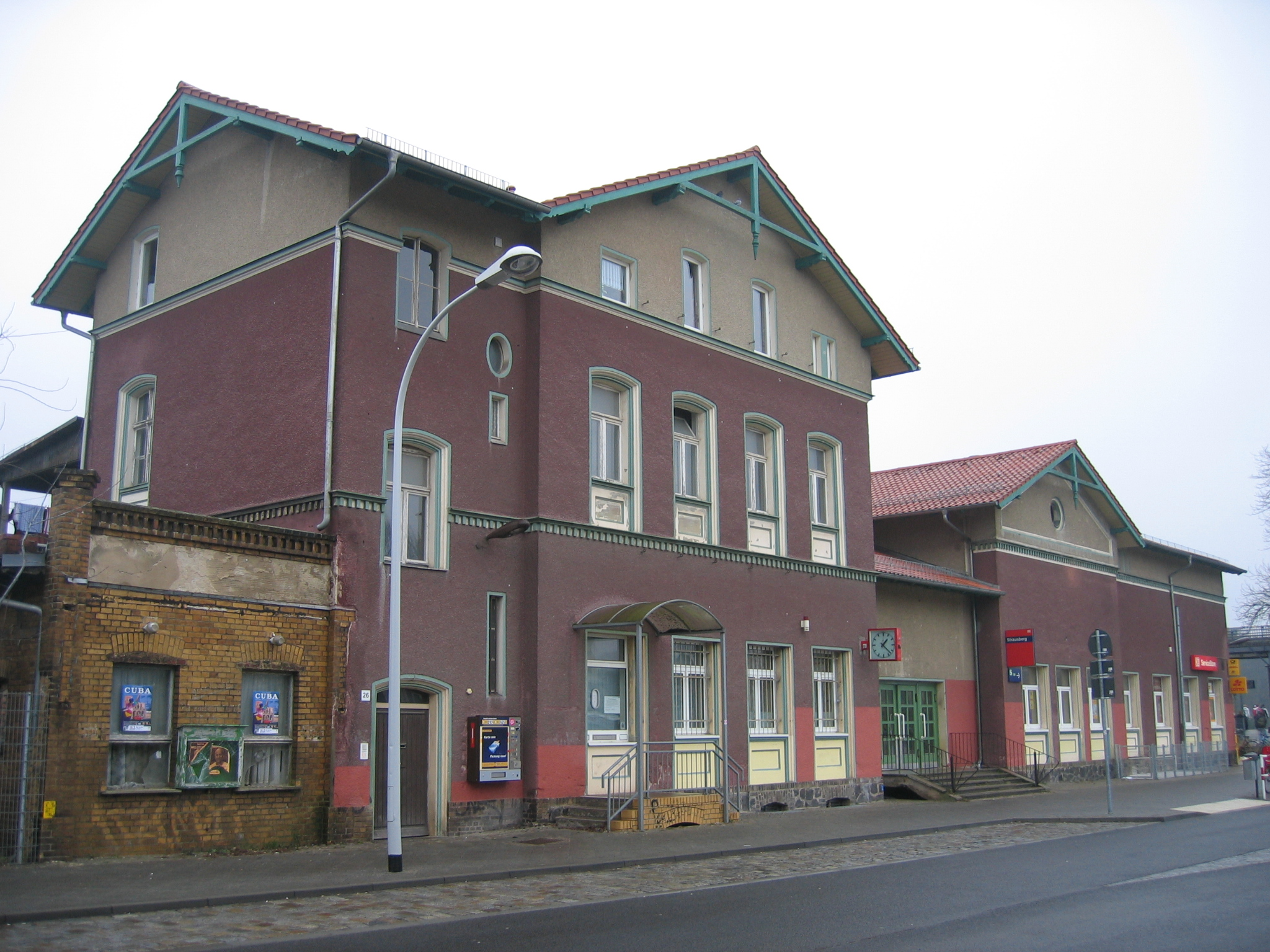
- Station building

General information
- Location: Bahnhofstraße 26; 15344 Strausberg; Vorstadt, Strausberg, Brandenburg; Germany
- Coordinates: 52°31′55″N 13°50′13″E
- Owner: DB Netz
- Operator: DB Station&Service
- Lines: Prussian Eastern Railway; Strausberg–Strausberg Nord railway; Strausberg Railway
- Platforms: 2
- Tracks: 3
- Connections: S5

Other information
- Station code: 6058
- DS100 code: BST
- Category: 4
- Fare zone: VBB: Berlin C/5462
- Website: www.bahnhof.de

History
- Opened: 1 October 1867

Services
Preceding station	Niederbarnimer Eisenbahn	Following station
Berlin-Mahlsdorf towards Berlin Ostkreuz	RB 26	Herrensee towards Kostrzyn
Preceding station	Berlin S-Bahn	Following station
Petershagen Nord towards Westkreuz	S5	Hegermühle towards Strausberg Nord
Location

Strausberg is the main railway station for the city of Strausberg in Brandenburg. It is served by the S-Bahn line S5.

== Overview ==
The station is part of the Prussian Eastern line Berlin-Gorzów and is the southern end of the Strausberg–Strausberg Nord line.

There is also a station for the Strausberg Railway as well as Regional trains from Berlin Lichtenberg to Kostrzyn.

== See also ==
- Strausberg Railway
- Straussee Ferry
- Strausberg Hegermühle station
- Strausberg Stadt station
- Strausberg Nord station
