= Berlin Bellevue station =

Railway station in Berlin, Germany

Bellevue
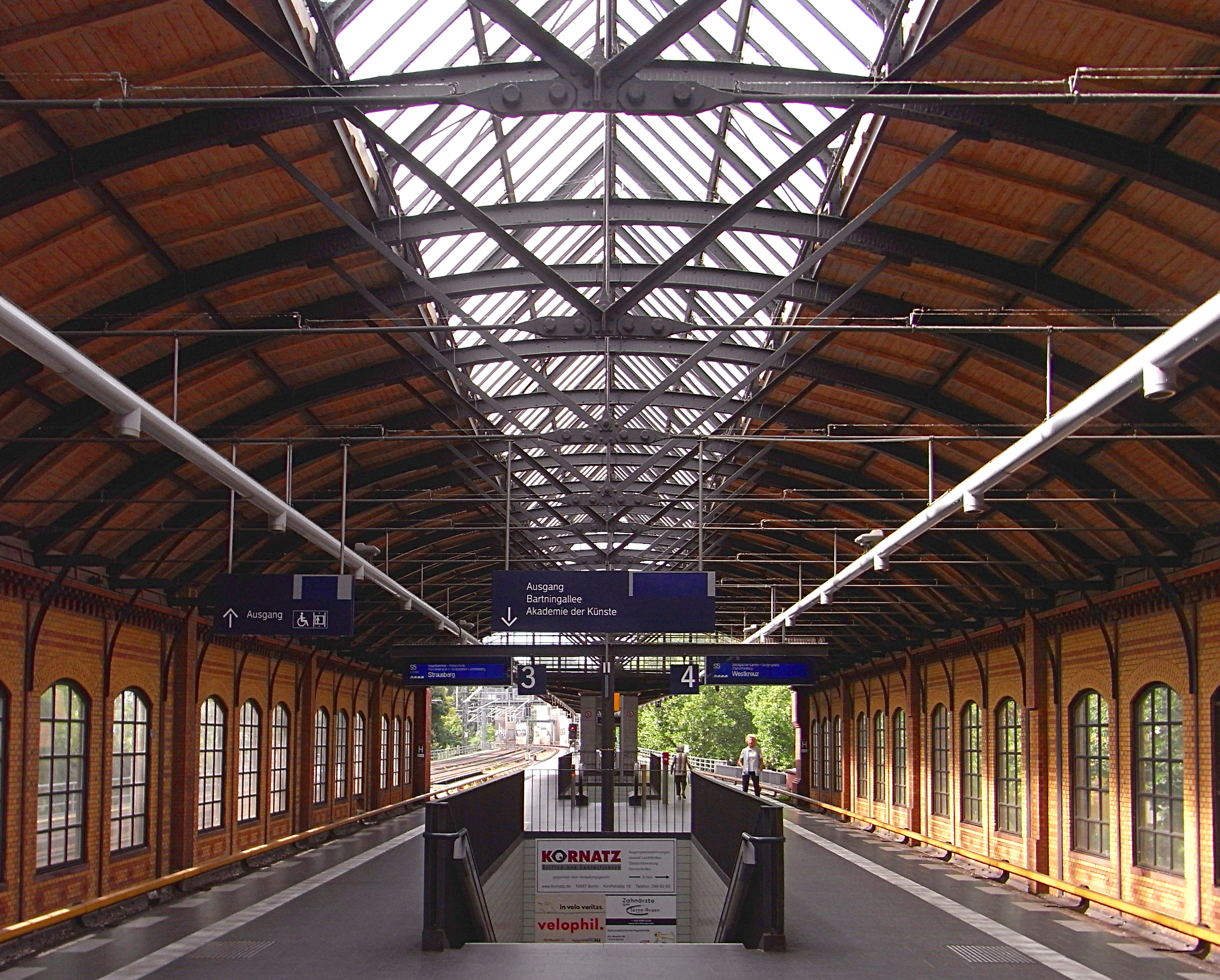
- Platform

General information
- Location: Mitte, Berlin; Germany
- Coordinates: 52°31′12″N 13°20′52″E
- Line: Berlin Stadtbahn
- Platforms: 2

Construction
- Architect: Johann Eduard Jacobsthal

Other information
- Station code: 0475
- DS100 code: BBEV
- Category: 4
- Fare zone: : Berlin A/5555

History
- Opened: 7 February 1882; 144 years ago

Services
Preceding station	Berlin S-Bahn	Following station
Tiergarten towards Spandau	S3	Berlin Hbf towards Erkner
Tiergarten towards Westkreuz	S5	Berlin Hbf towards Strausberg Nord
Tiergarten towards Potsdam Hbf	S7	Berlin Hbf towards Ahrensfelde
Tiergarten towards Spandau	S9	Berlin Hbf towards BER Airport
Location

Bellevue is a railway station on the Berlin Stadtbahn in the Hansaviertel district of Berlin, Germany. It is located on the elevated Stadtbahn line and served by Berlin S-Bahn trains. The station is named after nearby Bellevue Palace, the residence of the President of Germany.

== Location ==
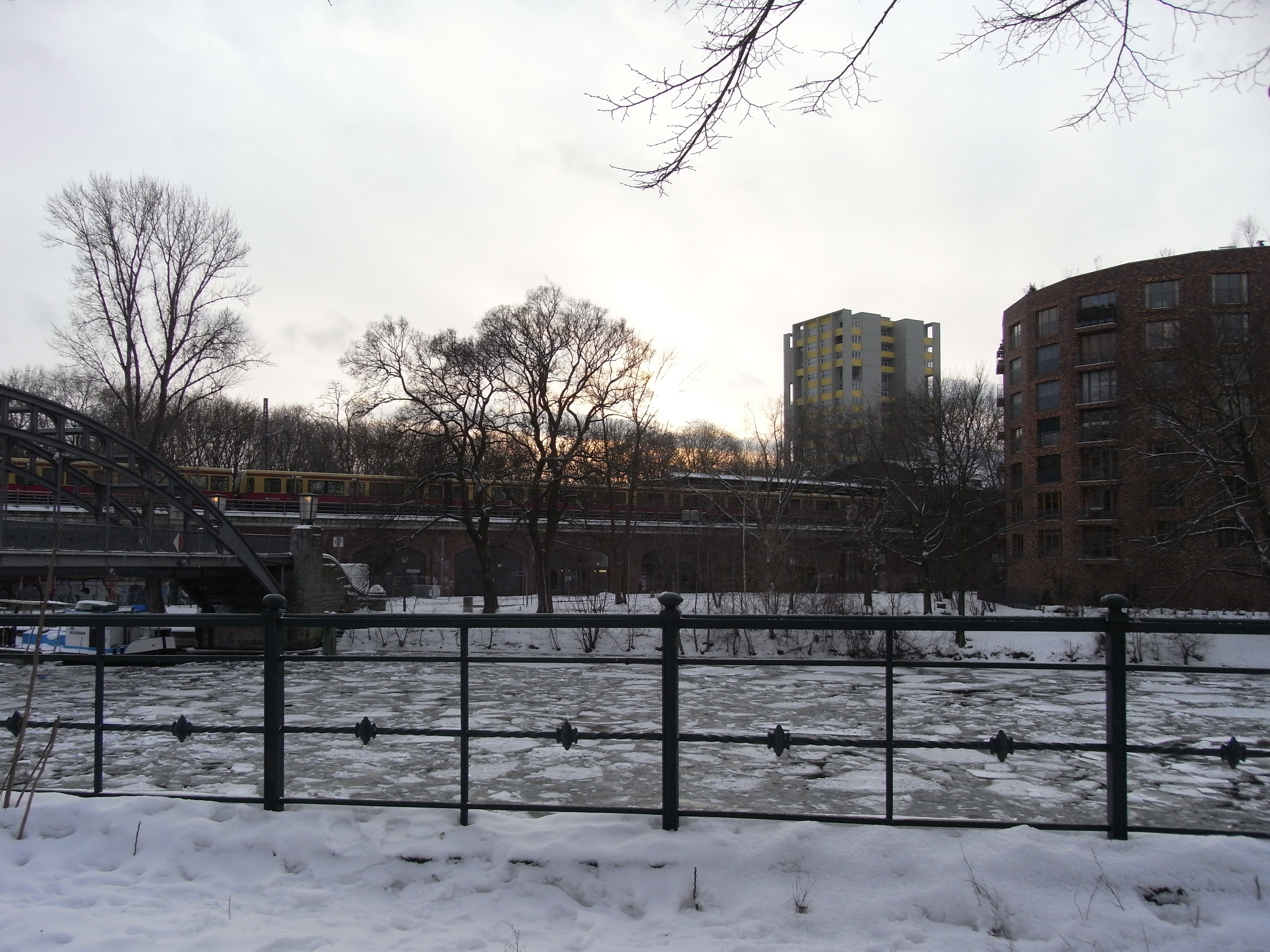
View from Spree river

The station is located about 2 km (1.2 mi) west of Berlin Hauptbahnhof, close to the Spree river and the southern rim of the Moabit quarter. Beside Bellevue Place, the Victory Column and Tiergarten Park can be reached in the vicinity. The adjacent Modernist residential area was largely rebuilt as part of the 1957 Interbau exhibition.

== History ==
Work on the station started in 1875 and it was opened together with most other Stadtbahn stations on 7 February 1882. Today, it is one of the two Stadtbahn stations still partly in its original state (the other being Hackescher Markt). After the introduction of the S-Bahn rapid transit system, the platform was rebuilt and extended between 1928 and 1932. It was damaged by the Bombing of Berlin in World War II and patched up until 1957.

The station has been a listed building since 1987, when it was again faithfully restored for the 750th anniversary of Berlin. After German reunification, the entire Stadtbahn viaduct was extensively restored. On 11 November 1996, Bellevue station was reopened after its modernisation was completed.

== Station layout ==
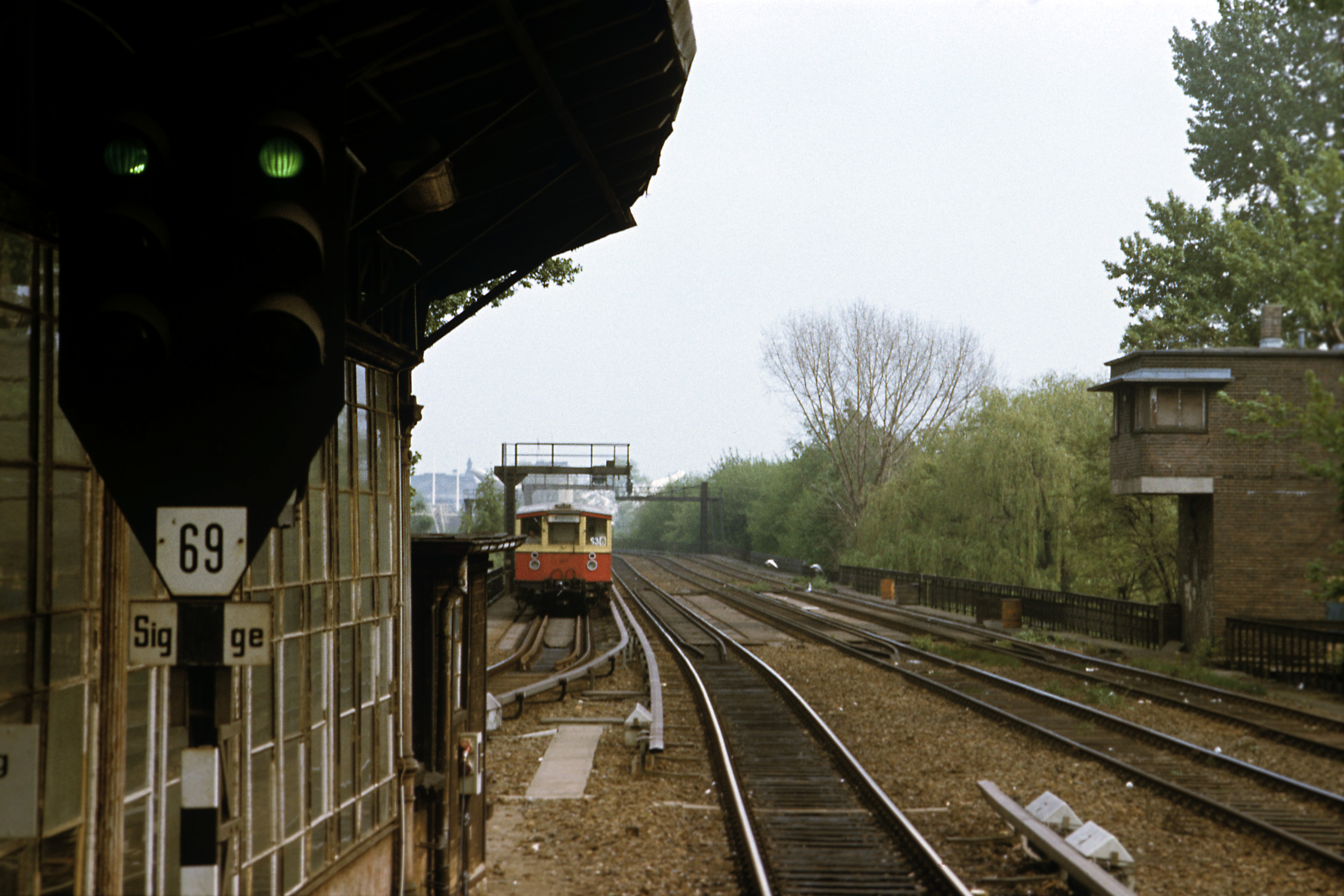
View from platform to the East, 1990

Tracks	Line	Destination
3	S3	for Berlin Hauptbahnhof, Ostbahnhof, Erkner
3	S5	for Berlin Hauptbahnhof, Ostbahnhof, Strausberg Nord
3	S7	for Berlin Hauptbahnhof, Ostbahnhof, Ahrensfelde
3	S9	for Berlin Hauptbahnhof, Ostbahnhof, Flughafen Schönefeld
4	S3	for Zoologischer Garten, Westkreuz, Spandau
4	S5	for Zoologischer Garten, Charlottenburg, Westkreuz
4	S7	for Zoologischer Garten, Westkreuz, Potsdam Hauptbahnhof
4	S9	for Zoologischer Garten, Westkreuz, Spandau
