= Strausberg–Strausberg Nord railway =

Railway line in Germany

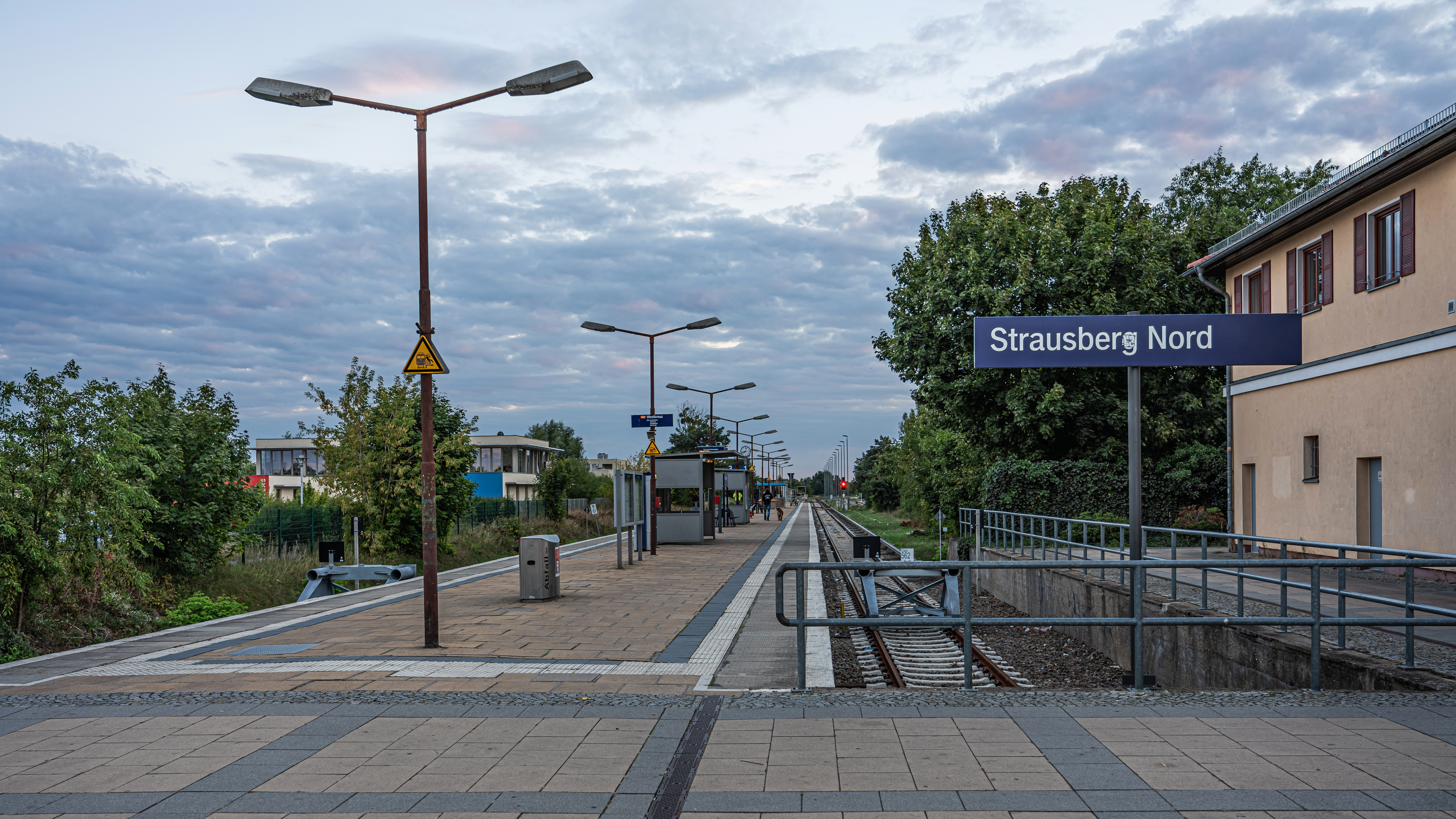
- Strausberg Nord station

Overview
- Line number: 6079
- Locale: Brandenburg, Germany

Service
- Route number: 200.5

Technical
- Line length: 9.1 km (5.7 mi)
- Track gauge: 1,435 mm (4 ft 8 1/2 in) standard gauge
- Electrification: 750 V DC
- Operating speed: 100 km/h (62 mph)

The Strausberg–Strausberg-Nord railway is a nine-kilometre-long single-track line in the district of Märkisch-Oderland in the German state of Brandenburg. It connects Strausberg station on the Eastern Railway with the centre of Strausberg, which is located north of the Eastern Railway. The line is served by S-Bahn line S 5 at 20-minute intervals. It is also served by some freight trains, which connect to the Strausberg base of the Luftwaffe in northern Strausberg.

== History ==
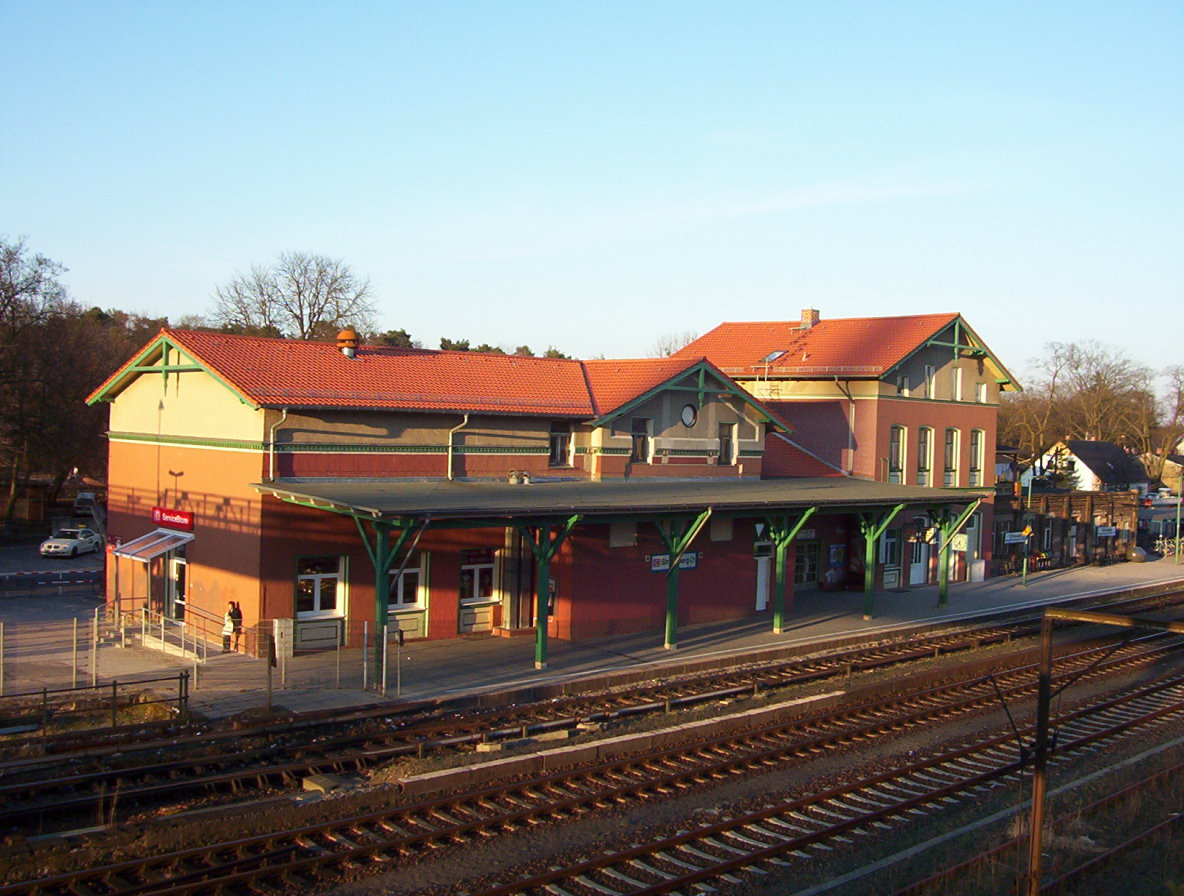
Former main platform of Strausberg station

The headquarters of the Kasernierte Volkspolizei (the militarised unit of the East German police, which was transformed in 1956 into the National People's Army) was moved in June 1954 from Berlin-Adlershof to Strausberg, because Berlin had been declared a demilitarised zone by the four occupying powers. As the headquarters were in the north of the city and the closest station was in the far south, the construction of a branch line was necessary. This was opened to traffic after a short construction period on 1 January 1955. The railway separated from the Eastern Railway behind the main platform of Strausberg station and followed a shallow curve to the north. In addition to the terminus at Strausberg Nord, Strausberg Stadt station was about seven kilometres from the beginning of the line and there was a siding to the Hugo Eberlein Guard Regiment just before the terminus. It was initially operated with diesel multiple units, which were replaced on 3 June 1956 by electric S-Bahn trains. The complicated track work at Strausberg station and the unfavourable situation of the “home platform”, prevented continuous operation, so that the operation of trains between Strausberg and Strausberg Nord was irregular.

Only after a continuous track connection was made on 26 May 1968 could continuous operations be started. As only one continuous track existed in Strausberg and the nearest passing place was in Strausberg Nord, however, services could only be operated at 40-minute intervals.

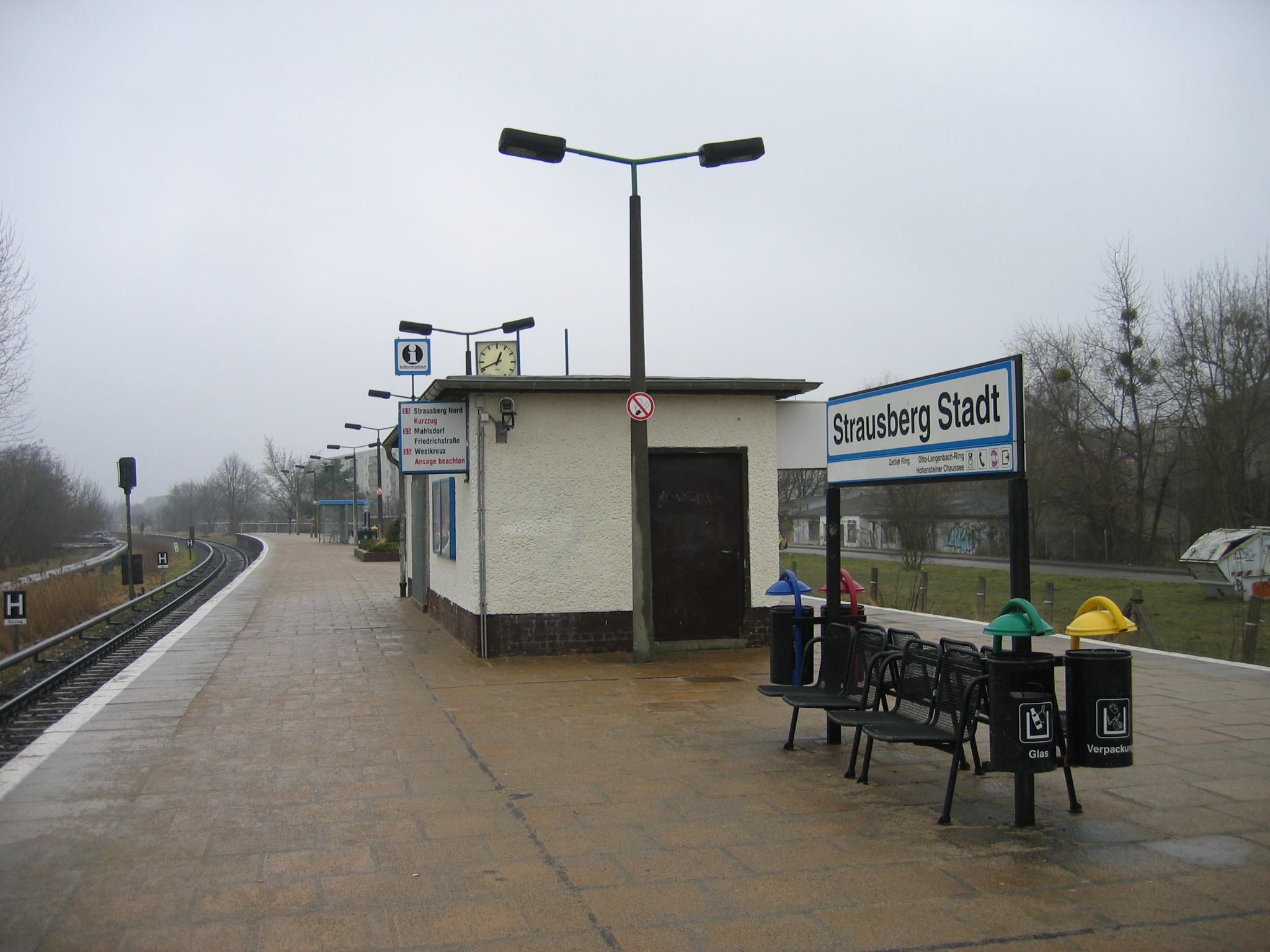
Platform at Strausberg Stadt station

Strausberg Hegermühle station was opened on 5 October 1984 about halfway between Strausberg and Strausberg Stadt in order to promote the development of the area between the two stations as well as to connect to boat trips on the nearby Herrensee.

After Die Wende (the turn) there were suggestions that the line be closed and that at the same time the parallel Strausberg Railway should be upgraded. Studies revealed that passenger numbers would increase from 10,500 to only 11,700, rather than the targeted 14,200. As a further means of stimulating passenger growth individual services of Regionalbahn line RB 26 ran during peak hours between Berlin-Lichtenberg and Strausberg Nord during the 1998/99 timetable period. However, since only about 200 passengers a day used this service, it was withdrawn in 1999.

Around 2000, the travel times on the S-Bahn from Berlin Alexanderplatz to Strausberg were shortened by nearly five minutes as the result of the modernisation of the fleet. Patronage on the line to Strausberg Nord increased between 1998 and 2002 alone by 24 percent. This in turn led to calls for an increase in services on the line to a frequency of 20 minutes, but the construction of a second track in the area of Hegermühle station would be necessary. The S-Bahn initially planned to implement the project by 2005. Although the state of Brandenburg approved the 20-minute cycle several years ago, Deutsche Bahn did not start planning for the extension of the line until after the state took over the planning costs of €450,000 in mid-2012. The plans were to be completed by 2014. It was planned to extend a 2.2-kilometre section between Strausberg and Hegermühle in two tracks. The estimated cost was about €7 million.

The actual construction work for the construction of the 2.2-kilometre encounter section took place during an eight-week full closure until the end of September 2015. Prior to the commissioning, the bridge over Garzauer Straße was rebuilt to the south of a 187-metre long soundproof wall. The commissioning of the crossing loop and the upgrade of operations to 20-minute intervals to Strausberg Nord was made at the timetable change on 13 December 2015.
