= S86 =

S86 may refer to:

- S86 (Berlin), a S-Bahn line
- S86 (New York City bus) serving Staten Island
- Blériot-SPAD S.46, a French airliner
- Expressway S86 (Poland)
- Greek submarine Triaina (S-86)
- Sky Harbor Airport (Washington), in Snohomish County, Washington, United States
