= Herrensee =

Herrensee may refer to:

Lakes:

- Herrensee (Litschau), a lake near Litschau in the district of Gmünd in Lower Austria
- Herrensee (Strausberg), a lake near Strausberg, in the Märkisch-Oderland district, Brandenburg, Germany
- Herrensee (Waren), a lake in the town of Waren (Müritz) in Mecklenburg-Western Pomerania, Germany
- one of the Osterseen in the district of Weilheim-Schongau in Bavaria, Germany

Villages:

- a village in the municipality of Rehfelde in the district of Märkisch-Oderland in Brandenburg, Germany
