= Berlin-Tiergarten station =

Railway station in Berlin, Germany

Tiergarten

General information
- Location: Mitte, Berlin; Germany
- Coordinates: 52°30′52″N 13°20′11″E
- Line: Berlin Stadtbahn
- Platforms: 2

Construction
- Accessible: Yes

Other information
- Station code: 6217
- DS100 code: BTGN
- IBNR: 8089091
- Category: 4
- Fare zone: : Berlin A/5555
- Website: www.bahnhof.de

History
- Opened: 5 January 1885

Services
Preceding station	Berlin S-Bahn	Following station
Zoologischer Garten towards Spandau	S3	Bellevue towards Erkner
Zoologischer Garten towards Westkreuz	S5	Bellevue towards Strausberg Nord
Zoologischer Garten towards Potsdam Hbf	S7	Bellevue towards Ahrensfelde
Zoologischer Garten towards Spandau	S9	Bellevue towards BER Airport
Location

Berlin Tiergarten is a railway station on the Berlin Stadtbahn line in the Tiergarten district of Berlin. It lies between the stations of Zoologischer Garten and Bellevue on the Straße des 17. Juni in the Hansaviertel locality of the Mitte borough. It opened in 1885 and is served by the S-Bahn lines S3, S5, S7 and S9 and located very close to the Großer Tiergarten park. The station is part of the Stadtbahn viaduct and has heritage listing.

== Location and construction ==
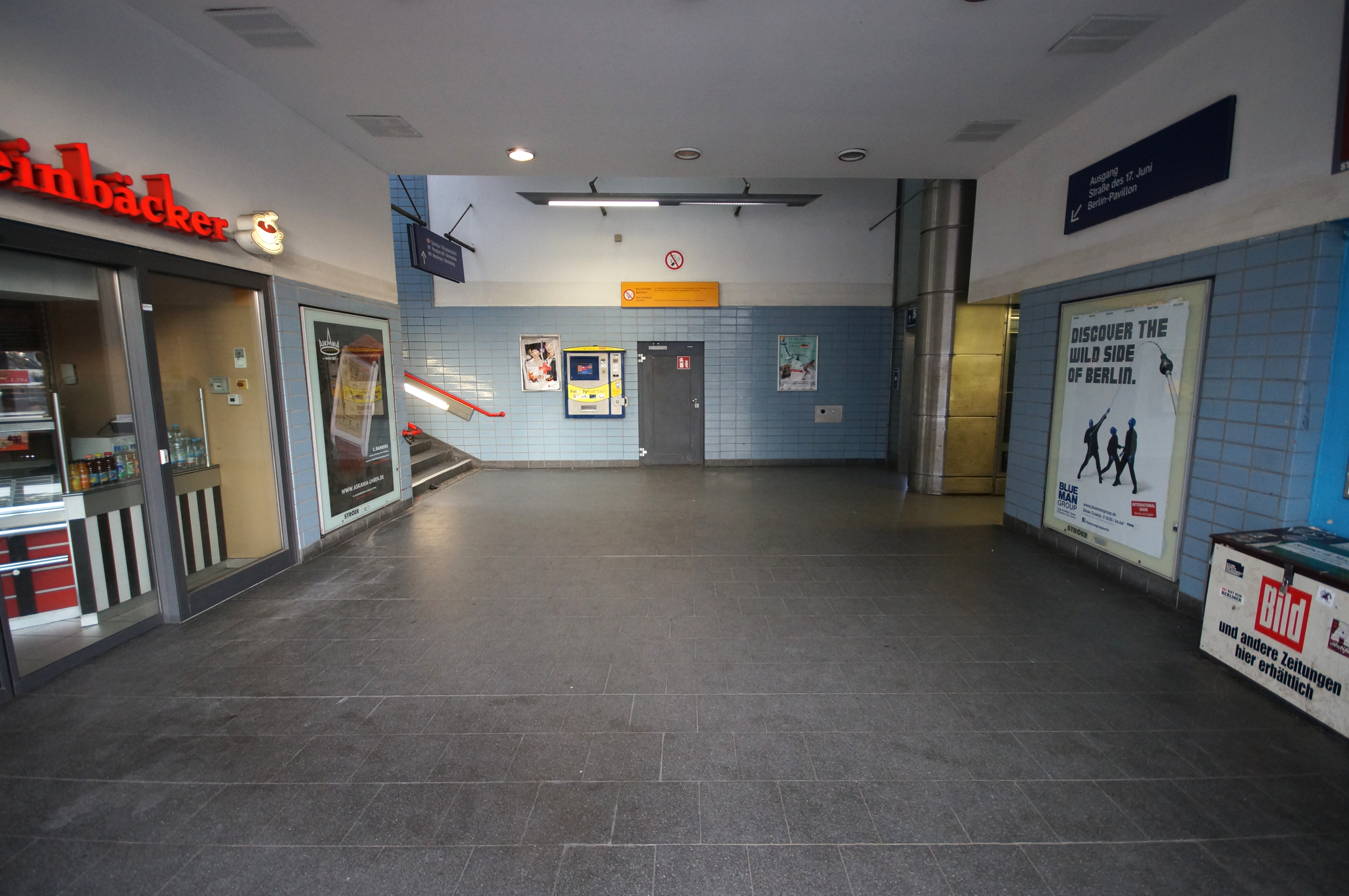
Station hall

The S-Bahn station is located on the western edge of the Tiergarten north of the Straße des 17. Juni. To the west of the island platform is Bachstraße, which runs parallel with it in a north–south direction. On the eastern side is the Berlin Pavilion, which was built as an exhibition space in 1957, but is now used as a Burger King restaurant.

The station concourse is between the main entrance and the platform.

== History ==
The station, initially called Haltestelle ("halt") Thiergarten, was opened on 5 January 1885 about three years after the opening of the Stadtbahn. It consisted of an island platform on the eastern pair of tracks, which was intended for suburban trains. The platform was covered by a train shed. The station served the Hansaviertel, which was built in the 1880s, and the neighbouring areas of the former city of Charlottenburg. The roof of the concourse, which was designed in the Gründerzeit style, was covered with corrugated galvanised iron.

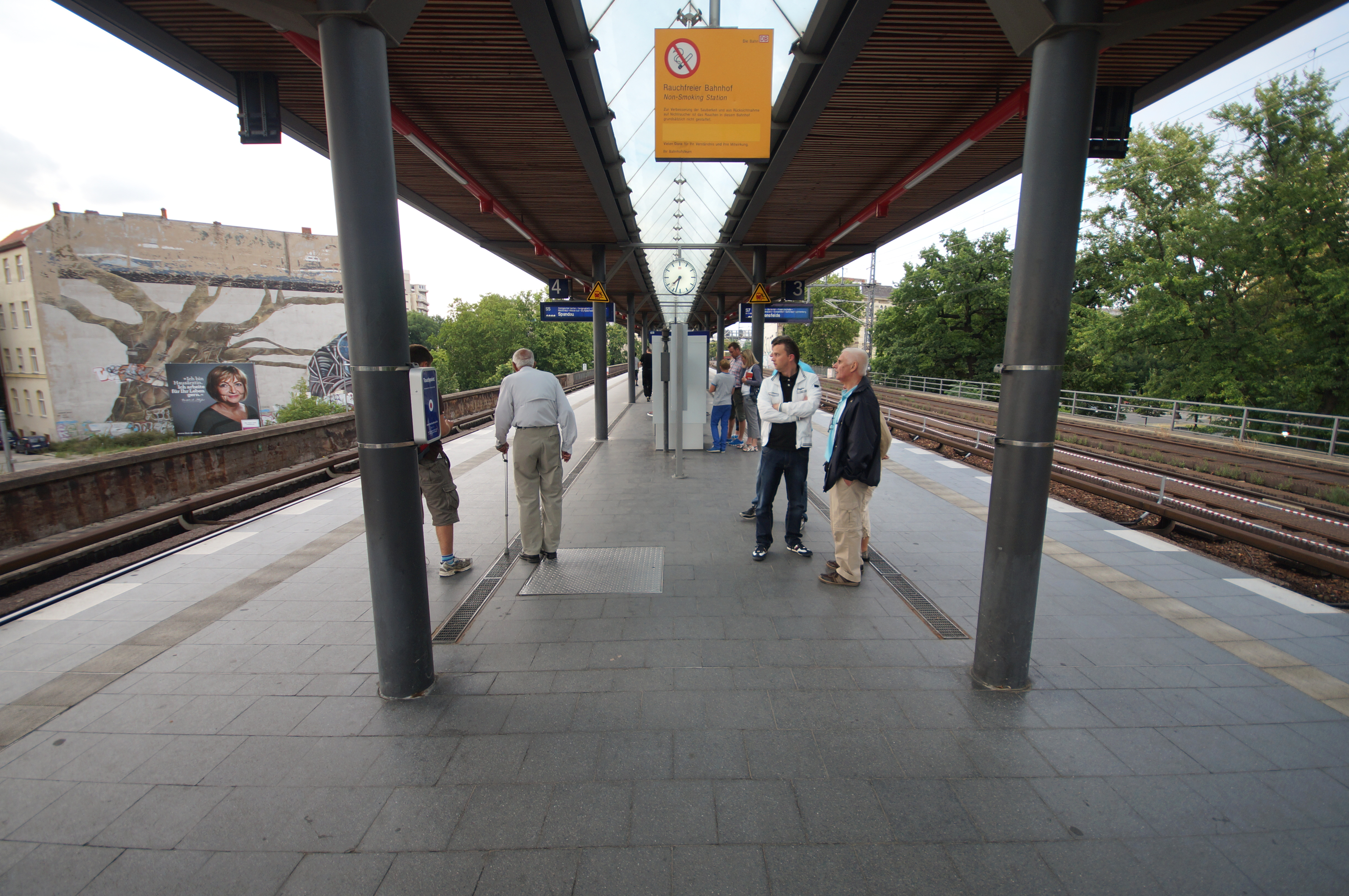
Platform

The Stadtbahn tracks through the station were electrified on 11 June 1928. The station was rebuilt in 1936. The old train shed was demolished and replaced by a simple roof construction with steel supports. At the same time, the entire area of the station was redesigned in the style of Nazi architecture.

The station was out of service for work to restore the Stadtbahn viaduct from 30 October 1994 until 11 November 1996. On 19 July 2009, the station, which was formerly classified as a Haltepunkt (“halt”, that is it had no sets of points), was reclassified as a station as there is now a crossover to its north-east.

== Connections ==
The S-Bahn station is currently served by lines S3, S5, S7 and S9 of the Berlin S-Bahn. With the exception of a bus line, which substitutes for U-Bahn line U9 at night, there are no direct connections to other public transport.
