= Fredersdorf-Vogelsdorf =

- Municipality
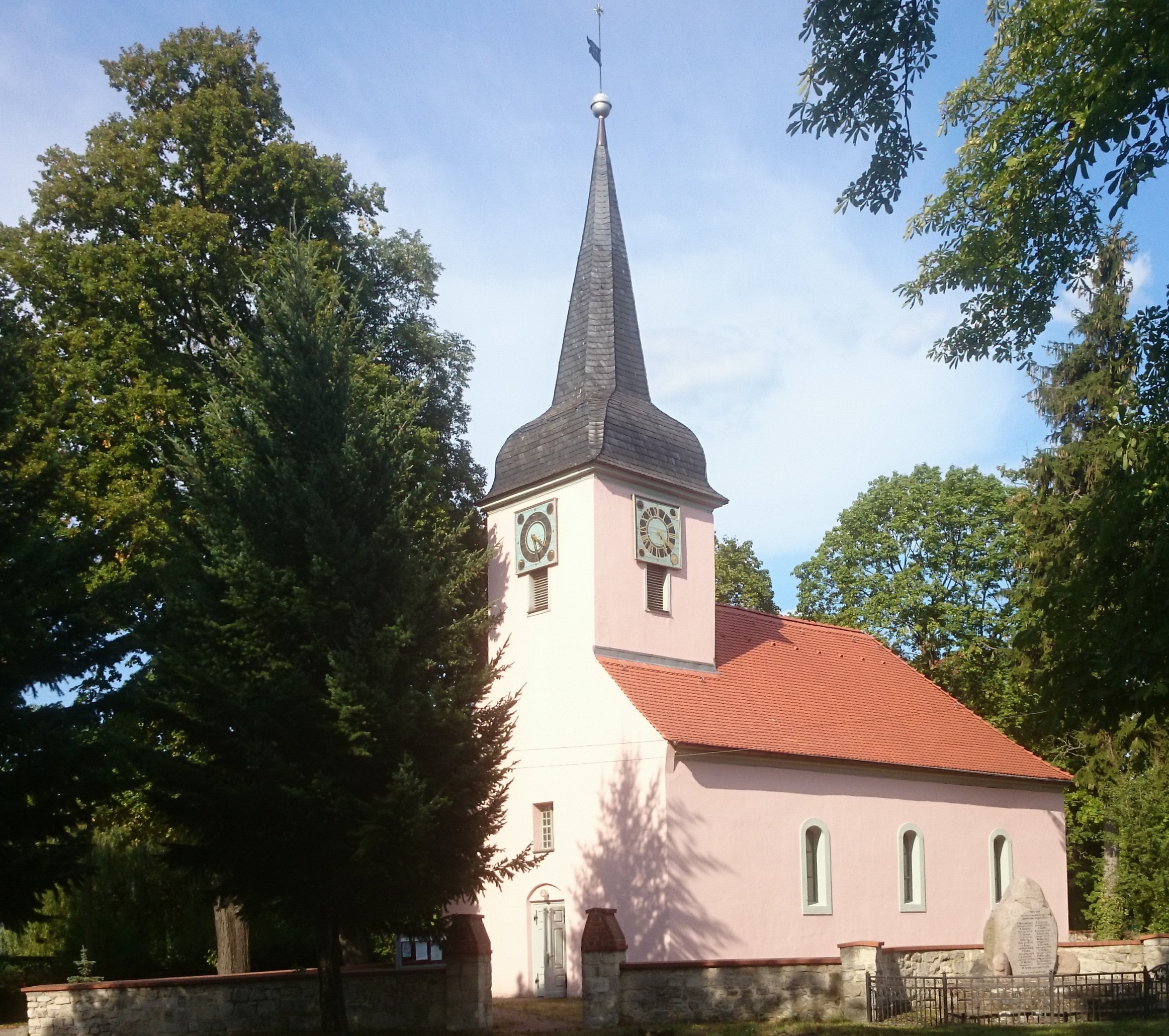
- Vogelsdorf's church

- Coat of arms

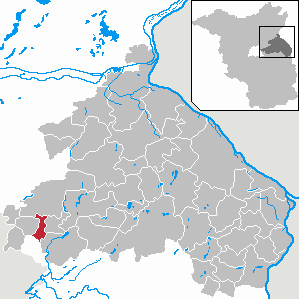
- Location of Fredersdorf-Vogelsdorf within Märkisch-Oderland district
- Interactive map of Fredersdorf-Vogelsdorf
- Location within Germany Location within Brandenburg
- Coordinates: 52.5252°N 13.7505°E
- Country: Germany
- State: Brandenburg
- District: Märkisch-Oderland
- Subdivisions: 3 Ortsteile

Government
  - Mayor (2023–31): Thomas Krieger (CDU)

Area
  - Total: 16.36 km^{2} (6.32 sq mi)
- Elevation: 53 m (174 ft)

Population (2025-12-31)
  - Total: 14,688
  - Density: 897.8/km^{2} (2,325/sq mi)
- Time zone: UTC+01:00 (CET)
  - Summer (DST): UTC+02:00 (CEST)
- Postal codes: 15370
- Dialling codes: 033439
- Vehicle registration: MOL
- Website: www.fredersdorf-vogelsdorf.de

Fredersdorf-Vogelsdorf is a municipality in the district Märkisch-Oderland, in Brandenburg, Germany.

== Geography ==
The municipality, situated 23 km east of Berlin centre, is composed by the main settlement of Fredersdorf and by Vogelsdorf.

== Demography ==
Development of Population since 1875 within the Current Boundaries (Blue Line: Population; Dotted Line: Comparison to Population Development of Brandenburg state; Grey Background: Time of Nazi rule; Red Background: Time of GDR rule)

Recent Population Development and Projections (Population Development before Census 2011 (blue line); Recent Population Development according to the Census in Germany in 2011 (blue bordered line); Official projections for 2005-2030 (yellow line); for 2017-2030 (scarlet line); for 2020-2030 (green line)

Fredersdorf-Vogelsdorf: Population development
within the current boundaries (2020)

Year	Pop.	±% p.a.
1875	859	—
1890	984	+0.91%
1910	1,766	+2.97%
1925	2,670	+2.79%
1939	5,552	+5.37%
1950	5,888	+0.54%
1964	7,923	+2.14%

Year	Pop.	±% p.a.
1971	8,036	+0.20%
1981	7,327	−0.92%
1985	7,180	−0.51%
1990	6,865	−0.89%
1995	7,740	+2.43%
2000	11,069	+7.42%
2005	12,401	+2.30%

Year	Pop.	±% p.a.
2010	12,801	+0.64%
2015	13,104	+0.47%
2016	13,572	+3.57%
2017	13,761	+1.39%
2018	13,873	+0.81%
2019	14,109	+1.70%
2020	14,310	+1.42%

== Transport ==
The village is well connected to Berlin by the S-Bahn line S5 at the station of Fredersdorf.

== Twin towns ==
Fredersdorf-Vogelsdorf is twinned with:

- Marquette-lez-Lille, France
- (United Kingdom) Sleaford, Lincolnshire, England (since 2009)
