= Strausberg Nord station =

Railway station in Strausberg, Germany

Coordinates: 52.5902°N 13.9084°E

Strausberg Nord
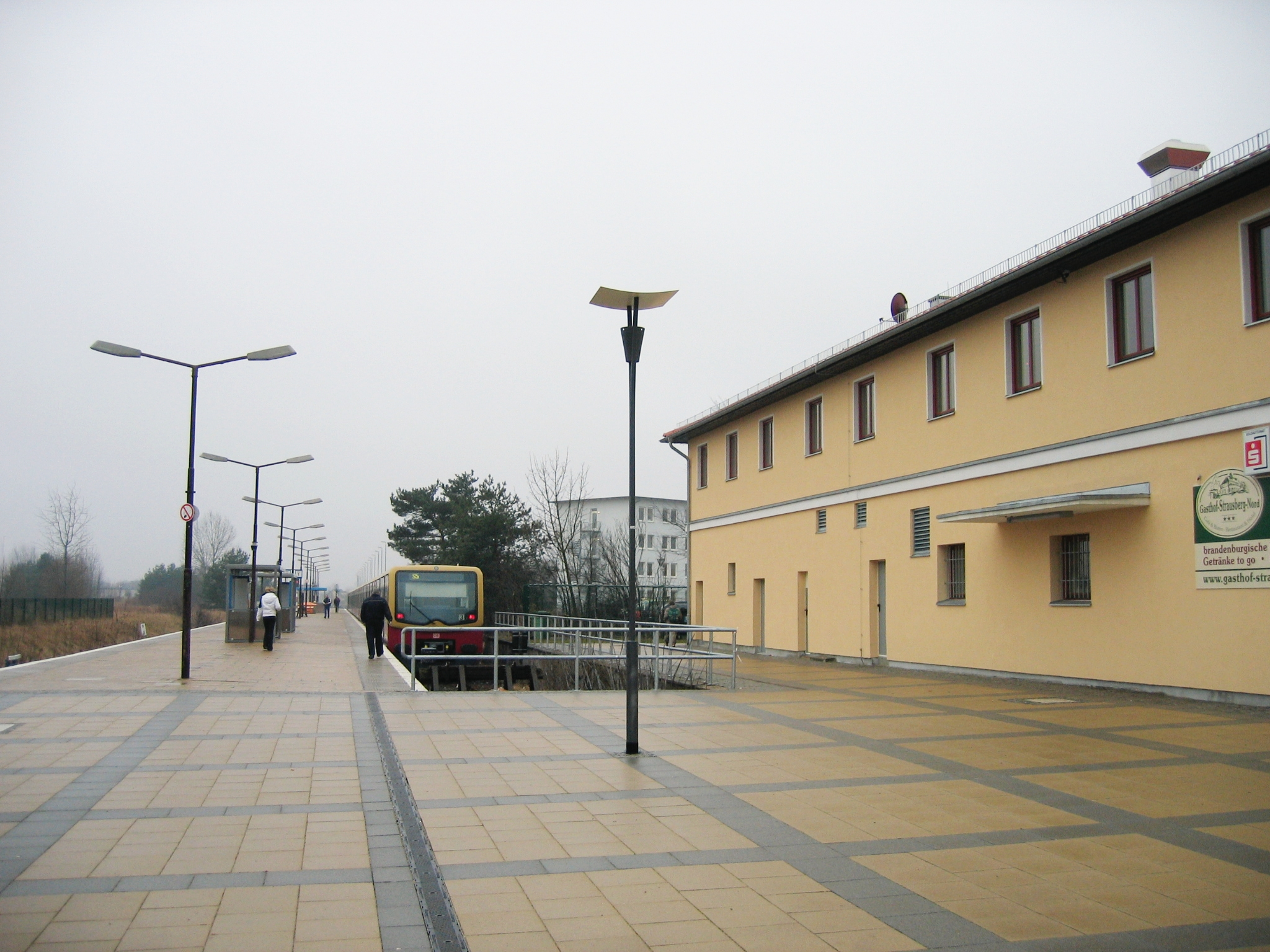
- Station building

General information
- Location: Prötzeler Chaussee/Am Flugplatz; 15344 Strausberg; Brandenburg; Germany
- Owner: DB Netz
- Operator: DB Station&Service
- Lines: Strausberg–Strausberg Nord railway (KBS 200.5)
- Platforms: 1 island platform
- Tracks: 2
- Train operators: S-Bahn Berlin
- Connections: 885 927 929 931 937 946 947 959 966 R931

Other information
- Station code: 6059
- DS100 code: BSTN
- IBNR: 8013064
- Category: 6
- Fare zone: VBB: Berlin C/5462
- Website: www.bahnhof.de

History
- Opened: 1 January 1955; 71 years ago

Services
Preceding station	Berlin S-Bahn	Following station
Strausberg Stadt towards Westkreuz	S5	Terminus
Location

Strausberg Nord is a railway station in the city of Strausberg in Brandenburg. Located on the Strausberg–Strausberg Nord line, it is the eastern terminus of S-Bahn line S5.

== Notable places nearby ==
- Strausberg Airfield
- Von-Hardenberg-Kaserne

== See also ==
- Strausberg Railway
- Straussee Ferry
- Strausberg station
- Strausberg Hegermühle station
- Strausberg Stadt station
