= S4 (Berlin) =

Overview
- Locale: Berlin

Service
- System: Berlin S-Bahn
- Operator(s): S-Bahn Berlin GmbH

Technical
- Electrification: 750 V DC Third rail

The S4 line number was used by the Berlin S-Bahn between December 1997 and June 2002. The line acted as a temporary route for the re-opened parts of the Berlin S-Bahn ring (Ringbahn in German) until the complete ring was fully re-opened in June 2002. The ring is now served by lines S41 (clockwise) and S42 (counter-clockwise).

== Routes ==
Line S4 commenced service between Jungfernheide and Schönhauser Allee in 1997, servicing the re-opened section of the Berlin ring. In May 1998, line was extended to Bernau. When Berlin ring between Jungfernheide and Westhafen was completed in December 1999, S4 was extended by two more stations. The final alteration to the route was in September 2001 when line was cut back from Bernau to run for the first time to Gesundbrunnen. The line was removed from service in June 2002 when last out of service ring station, Wedding, was re-opened. S4 was then replaced by S41 and S42 lines.
