= Herrensee (Strausberg) =

Lake in Brandenburg, Germany

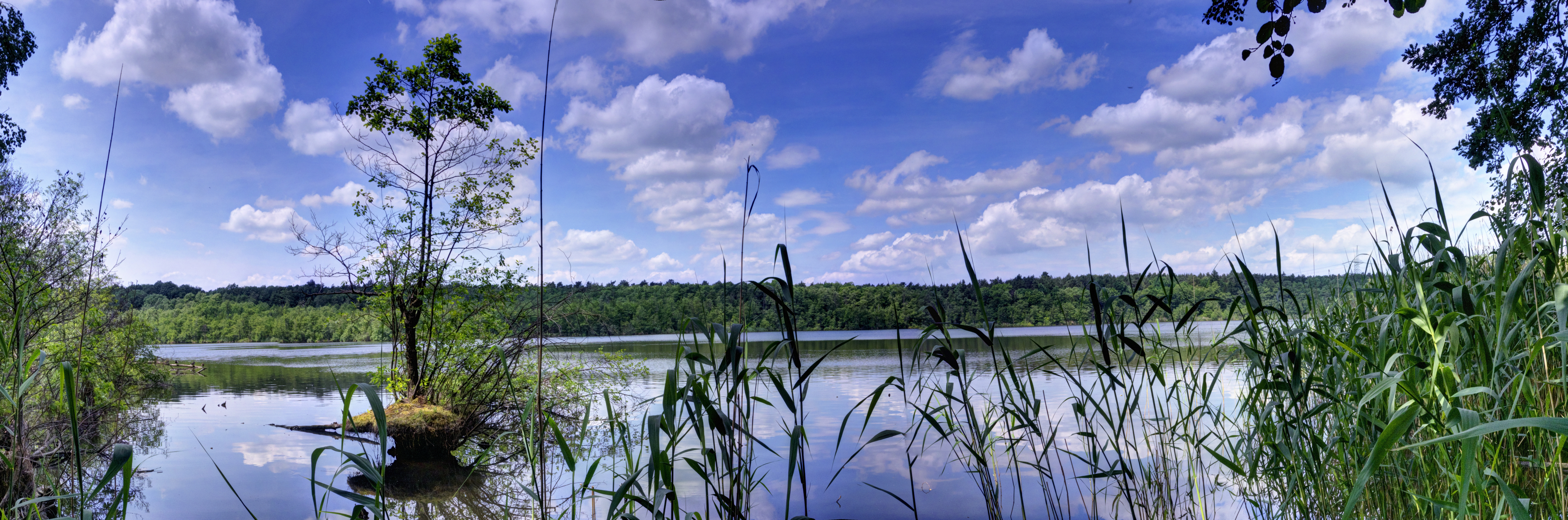

- Location within Brandenburg
- Location: Strausberg, Brandenburg
- Coordinates: 52.548°N 13.873°E
- Basin countries: Germany
- Settlements: Strausberg; Rehfelde

The Herrensee is a lake near the town of Strausberg, located in the Märkisch-Oderland district, Brandenburg, Germany. It is situated about 30 kilometres (19 mi) north-east of the city of Berlin.

Herrensee belongs to the Naturschutzgebiet Lange Dammwiesen und Unteres Annatal.

The lakes Bötzsee and Straussee are located nearby.

== Gallery ==
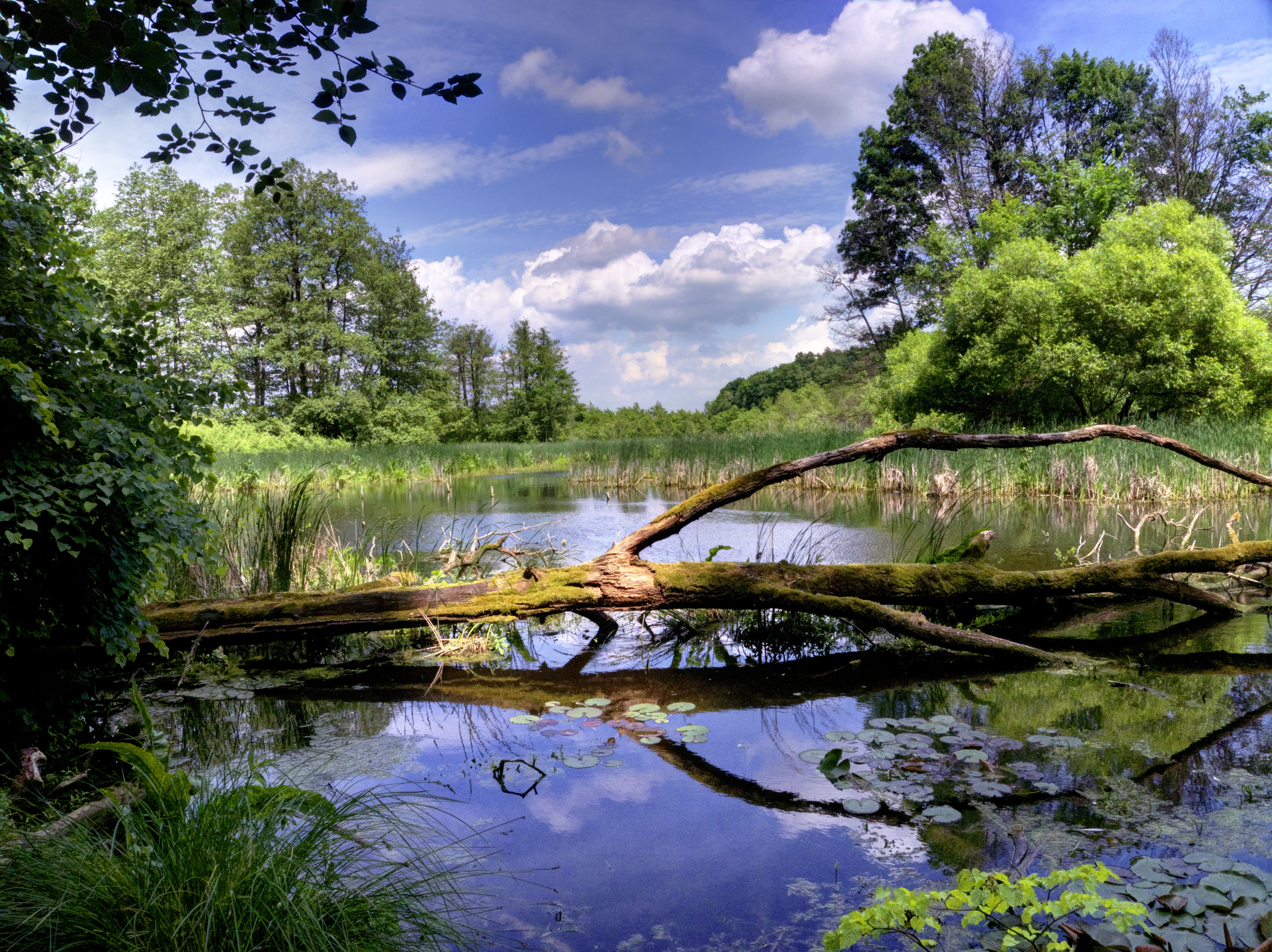

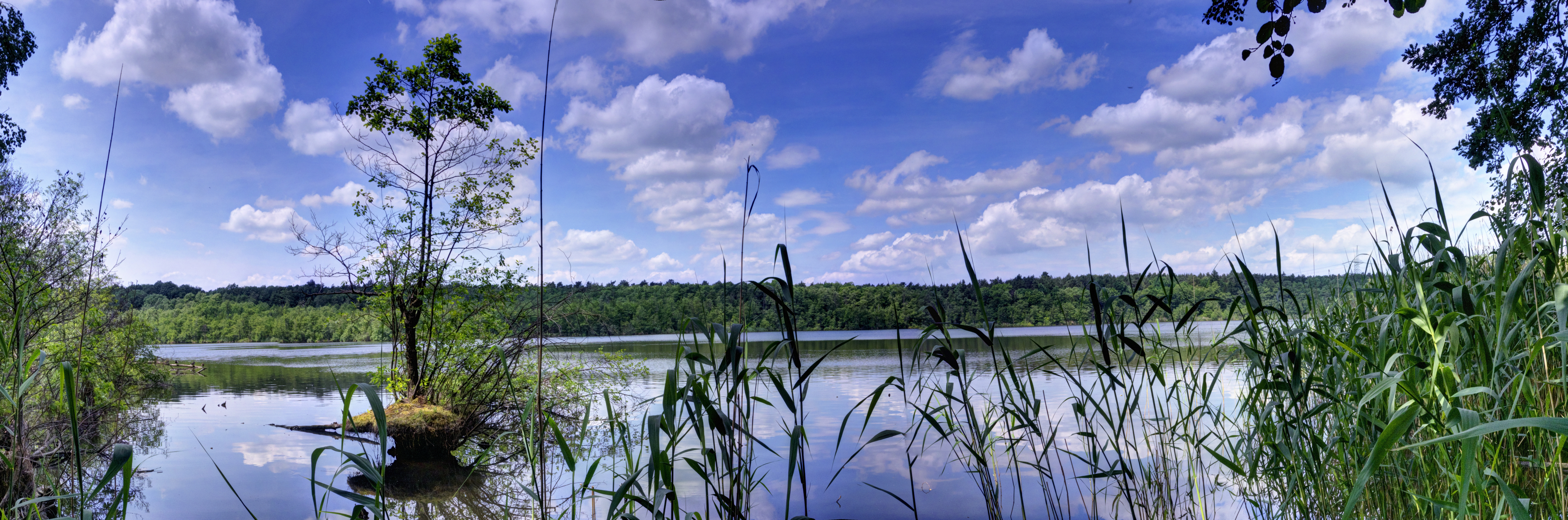

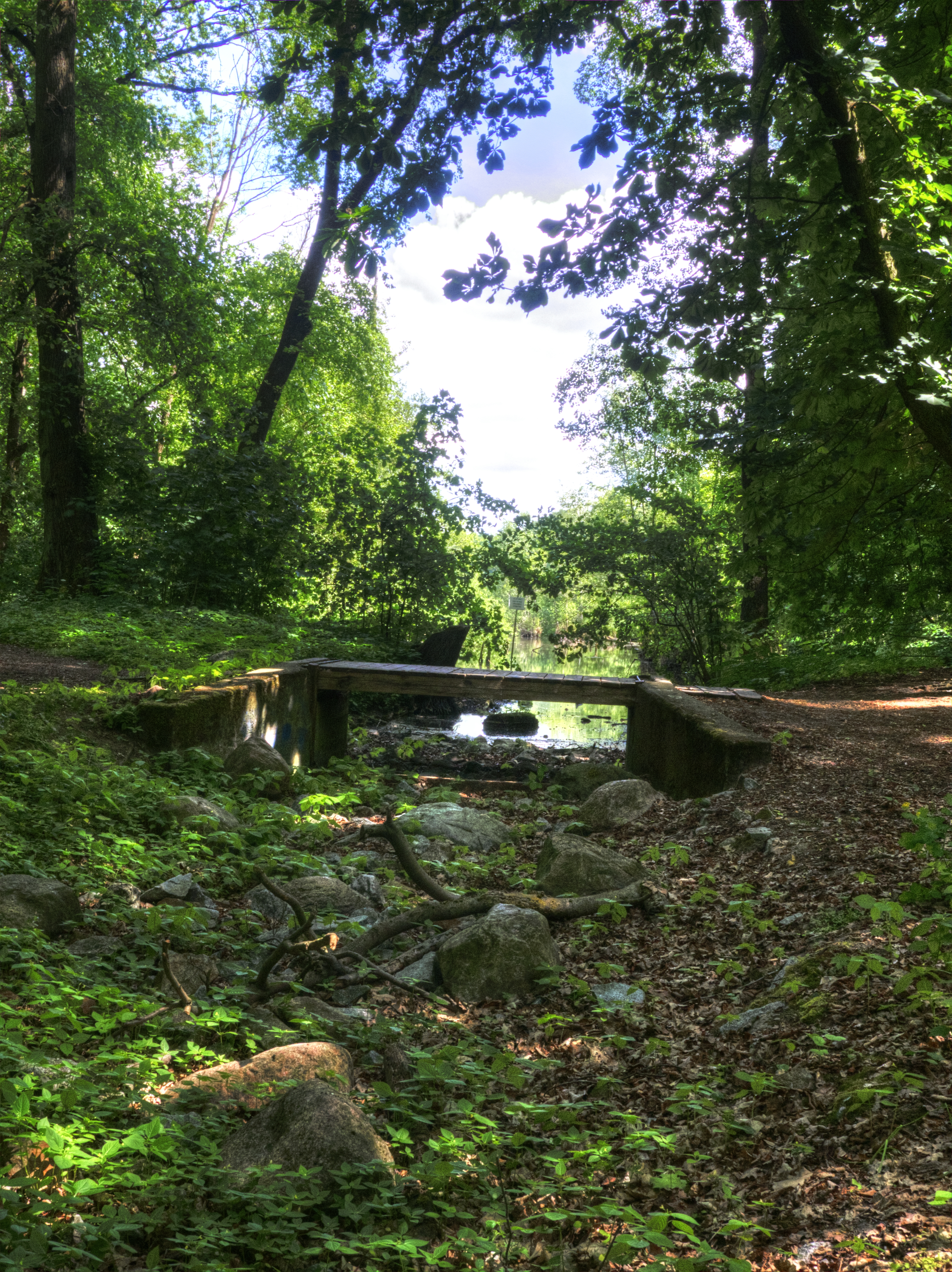

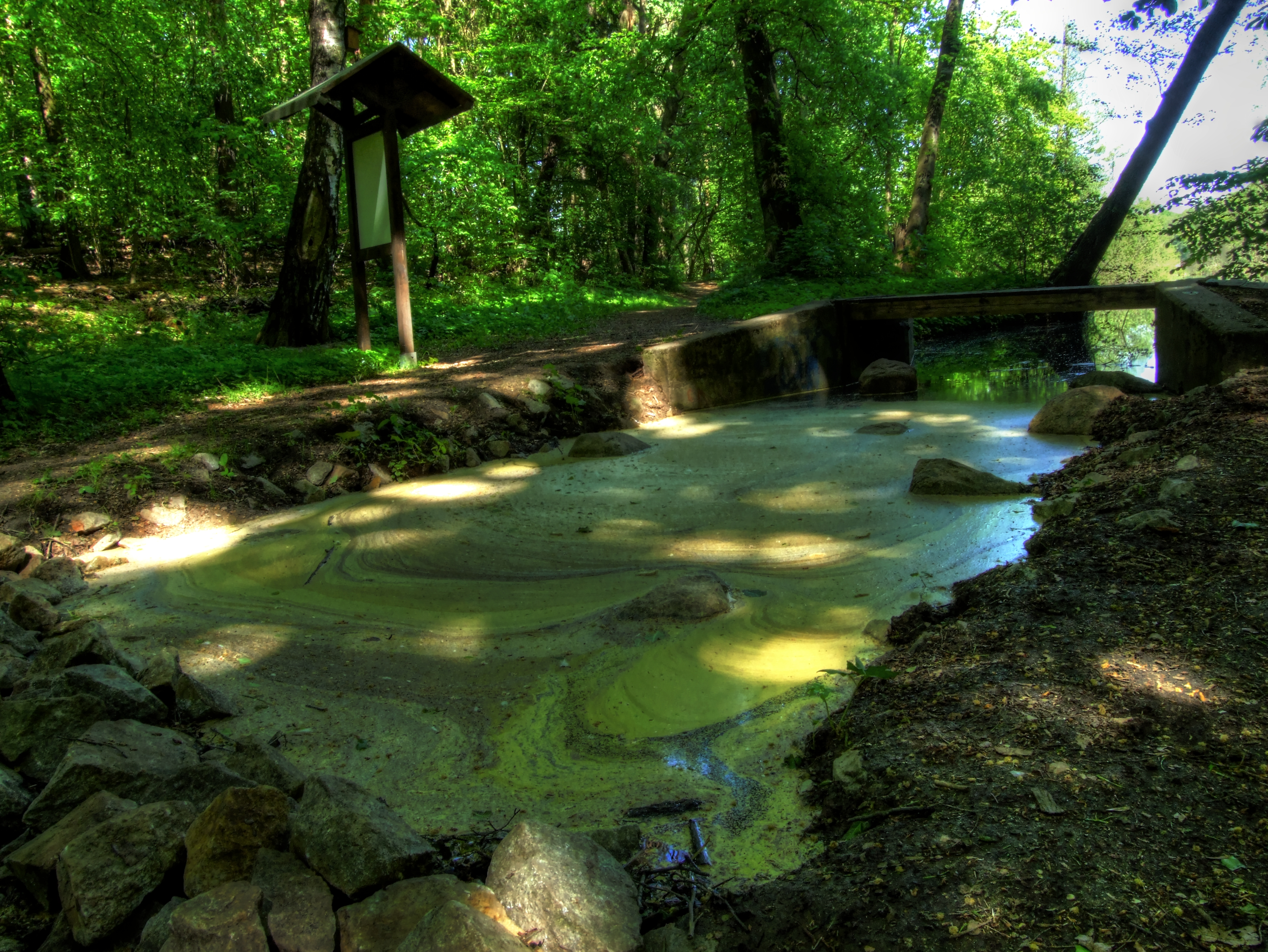
