= Strausberg Railway =

Strausberger Eisenbahn
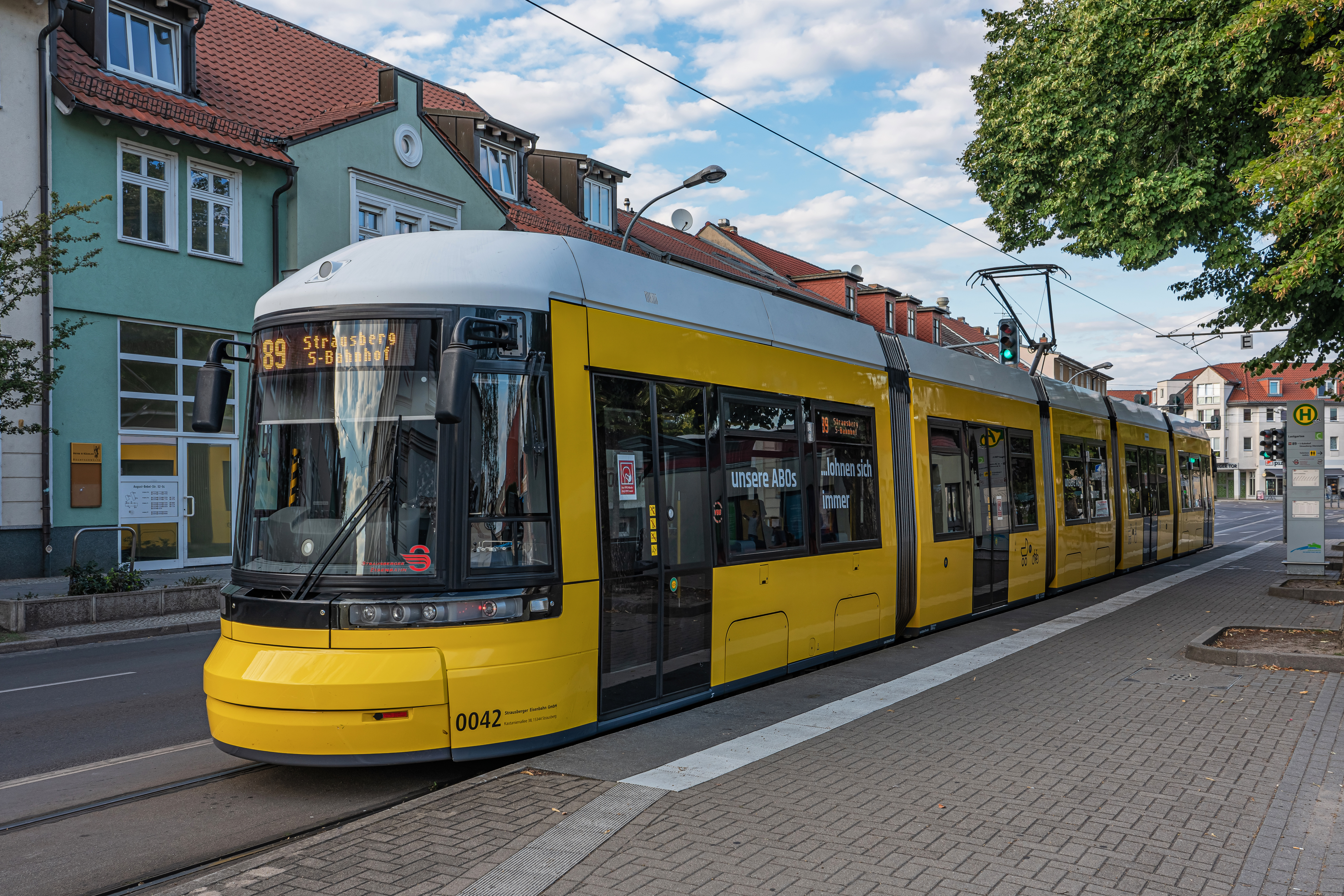
- A Flexity Berlin in Strausberg

Technical
- Line length: 6.2 km (3.9 mi)
- Track gauge: 1,435 mm (4 ft 8 1/2 in) standard gauge
- Electrification: 750 V DC

The Strausberg Railway (Strausberger Eisenbahn) is a light railway serving the town of Strausberg in Brandenburg, Germany. It links central Strausberg with the Strausberg railway station, where it connects with trains on the Berlin S-Bahn and the Niederbarnimer Eisenbahn. Although formally constituted and regulated as a railway, the line uses tramway style rolling stock and is superficially indistinguishable from a tramway.

== Overview ==
The railway is operated by the company Strausberger Eisenbahn GmbH. This company also operates the Straussee Ferry, an unusual electrically operated passenger cable ferry that crosses the Straussee lake from a landing close to the railway's Strausberg terminus.

== History ==
The railway was originally opened in 1893, at which time it was operated by steam locomotives and carried both freight and passenger traffic. In 1921 the line was electrified, and a new street based routing opened for the final 2.7-kilometre (1.7 mi) length into Strausberg. The originally routing remained open for freight traffic and was also electrified. In 1926, the line was extended from Lustgarten to Jugendheim, but this section closed in 1970. Freight traffic ceased in 2005, and the original routing was closed, along with the rail connection to the main line network.

The railway is of standard gauge, has a length of about 6.2 kilometres (3.9 mi), and is electrified on the overhead system at 750 volts. From south to north, the line serves stops at Strausberg railway station, Landhausstraße, Schlagmühle, Stadtwald, Hegermühle, Wolfstal, Käthe-Kollwitz-Straße, Elisabethstraße and Lustgarten. The depot is situated on the original route, and is accessed by a curve just beyond the Lustgarten terminus.

The line had been mainly operated by three ČKD Tatra KT8D5 tram cars, built in 1989/1990 and acquired from Košice in 1995. A prototype ČKD Tatra T6C5 car, built in 1998 as a demonstrator for the United States market and operated on the New Orleans streetcar system for several months, had been acquired from Siemens (the new owners of Tatra) in 2003 and had been used in off-peak service. Two older Reko-Triebwagen TZ 69 cars, built in 1969 and acquired in the 1980s, were still available for passenger service, and a third had been converted into a works car. The railway also owns an even older preserved passenger car, dating from 1925.

The Strausberg Railway joined the delivery framework of the BVG Berlin Transport Company ordering 2 Flexity Berlin trams on 5. September 2011. The two short double-sided two-cab trams were delivered in February and March 2013 replacing its older trams in daily service.

== Photogallery ==
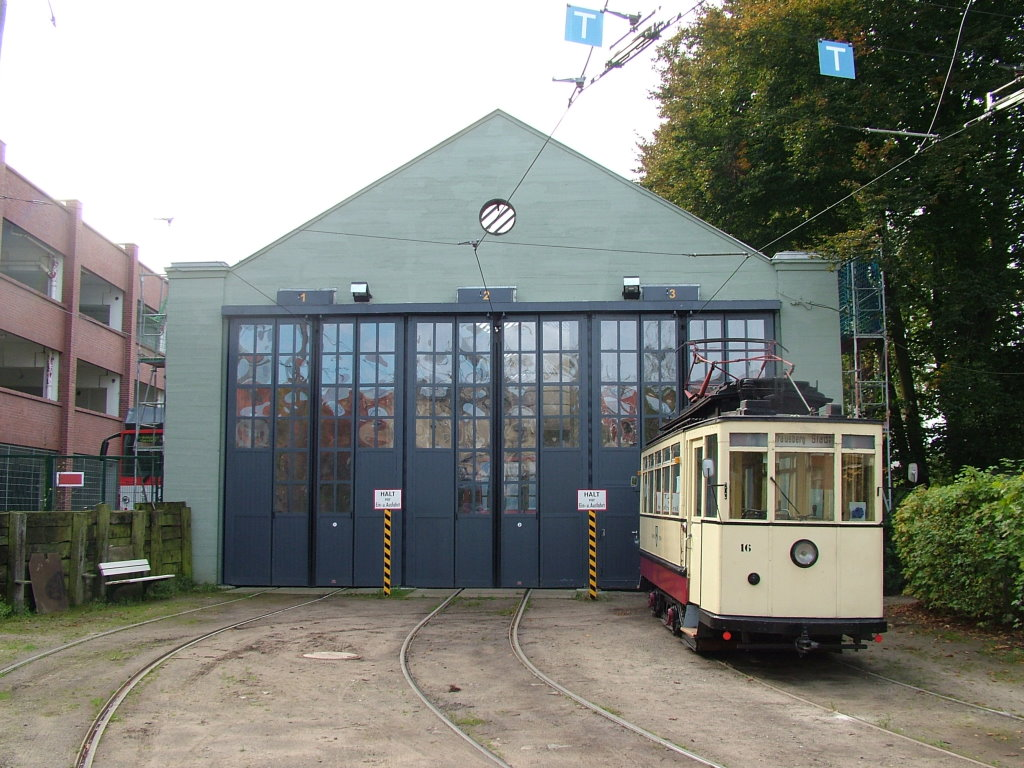
Historic tramcar 16, dating from 1925, standing on the depot fan in front of the depot.

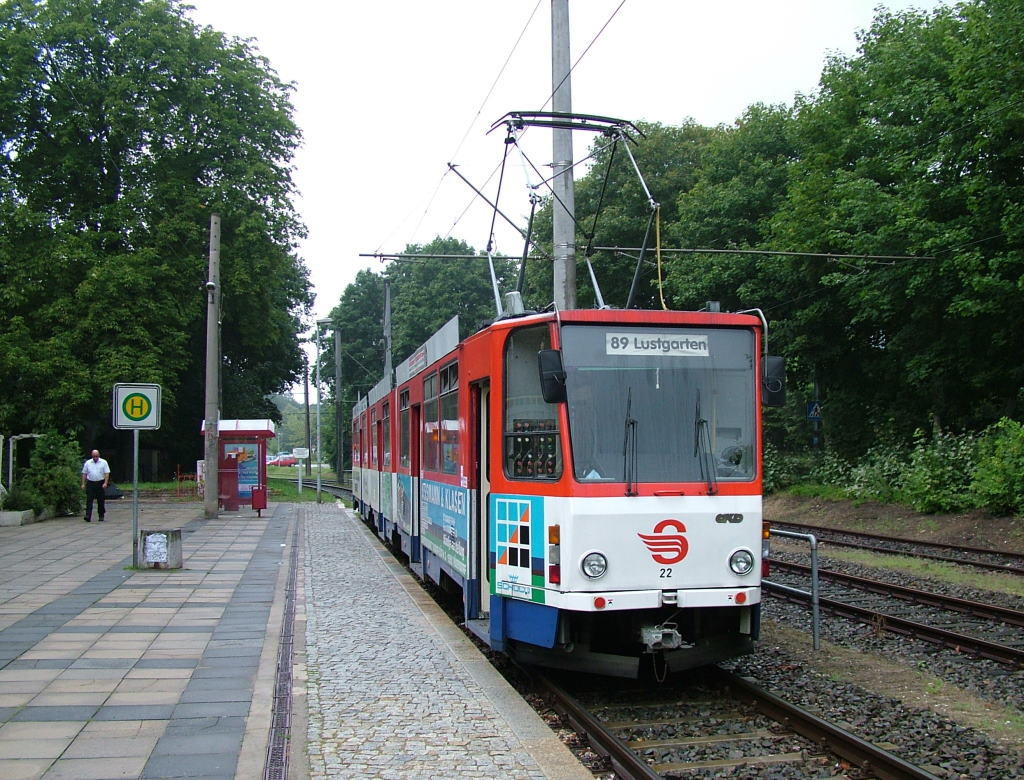
A Tatra KT8D5 at Hegermühle station

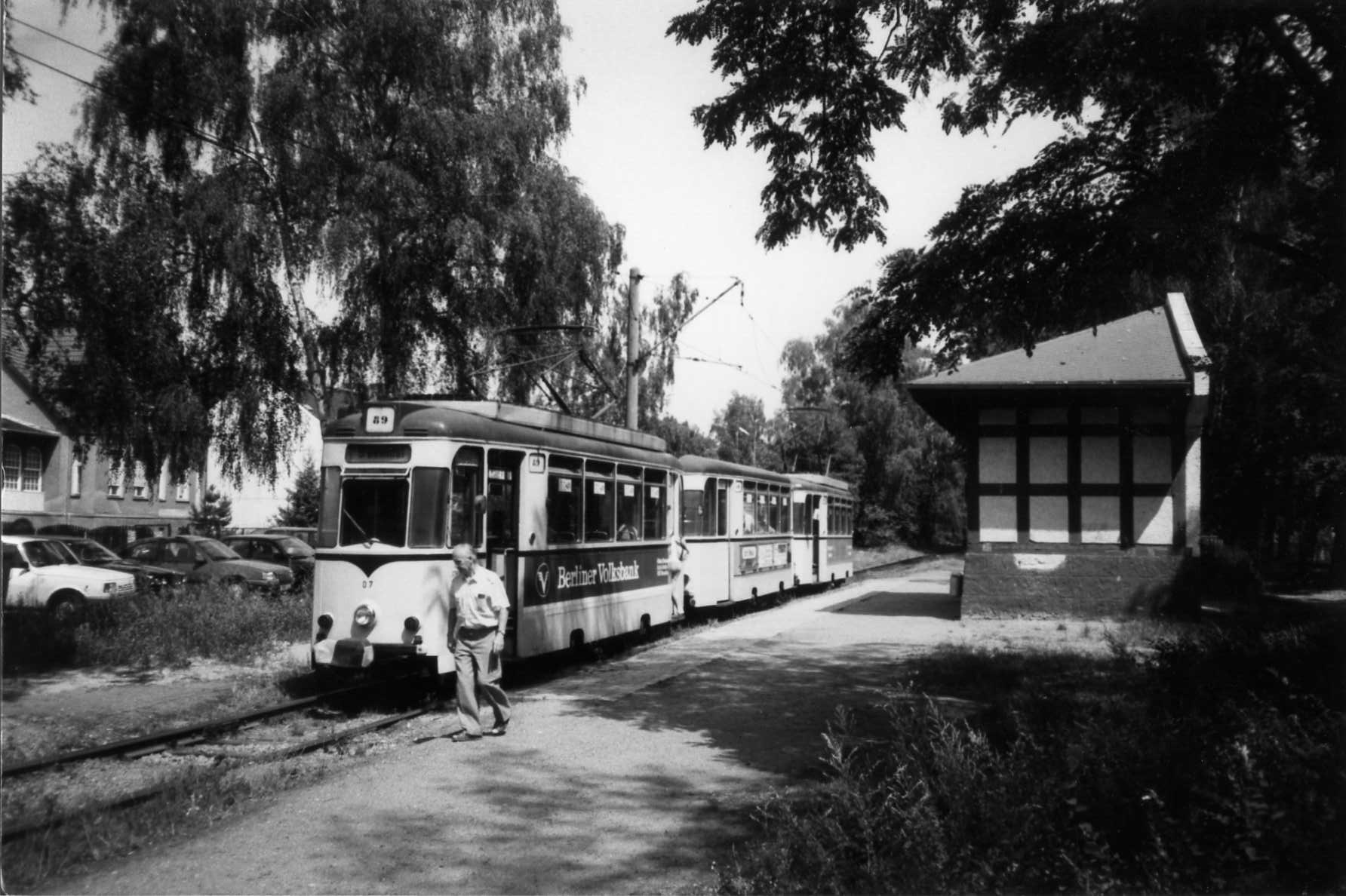
Historic tramcar in 1993

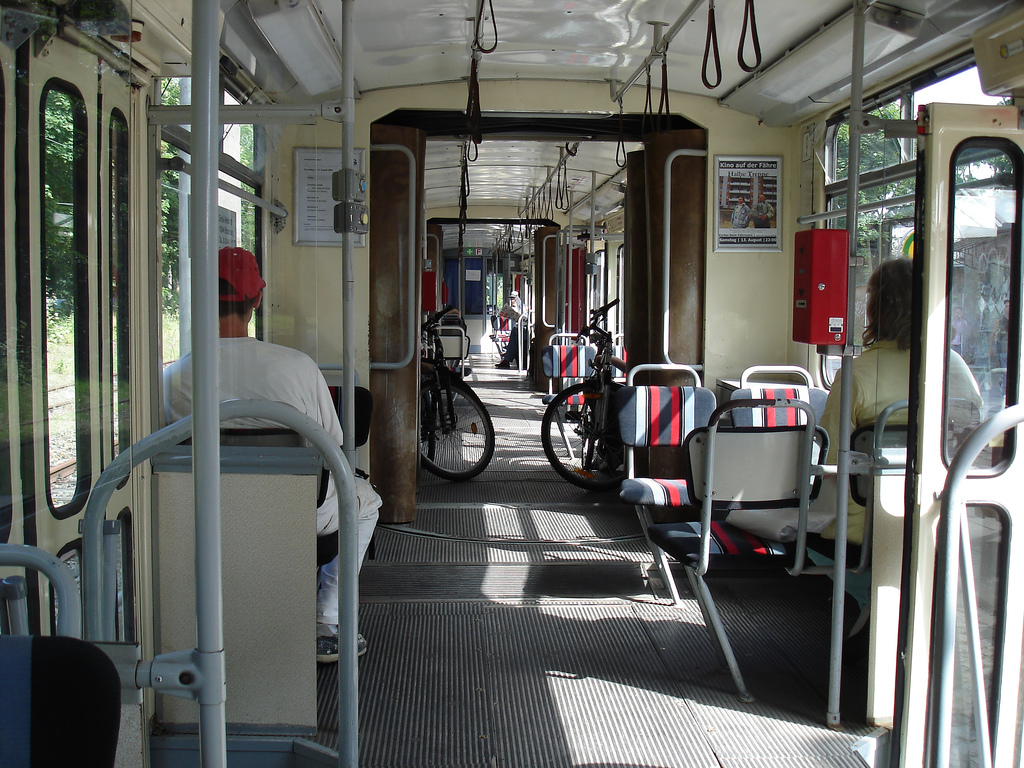
Inner view of the tram

== See also ==
- Straussee Ferry
- Strausberg station
- Berlin Tramway
- Potsdam Tramway
