= Straussee Ferry =

Coordinates: 52.576989°N 13.876666°E

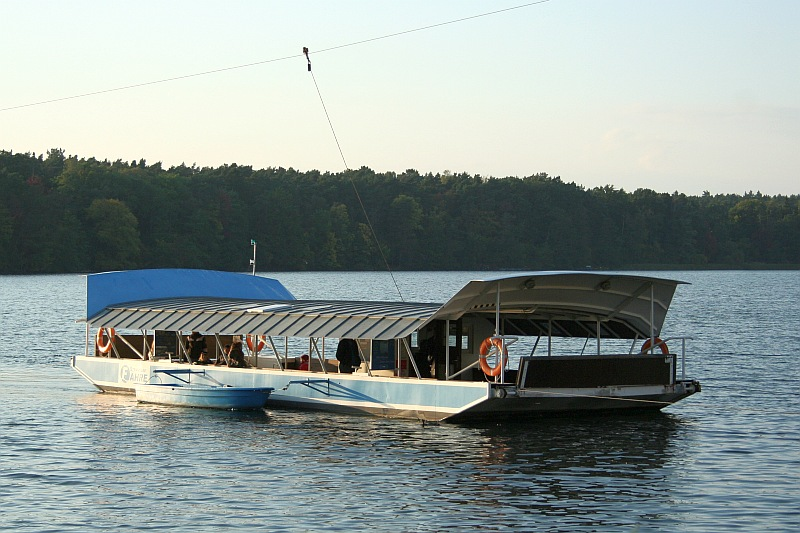
The ferry Steffi

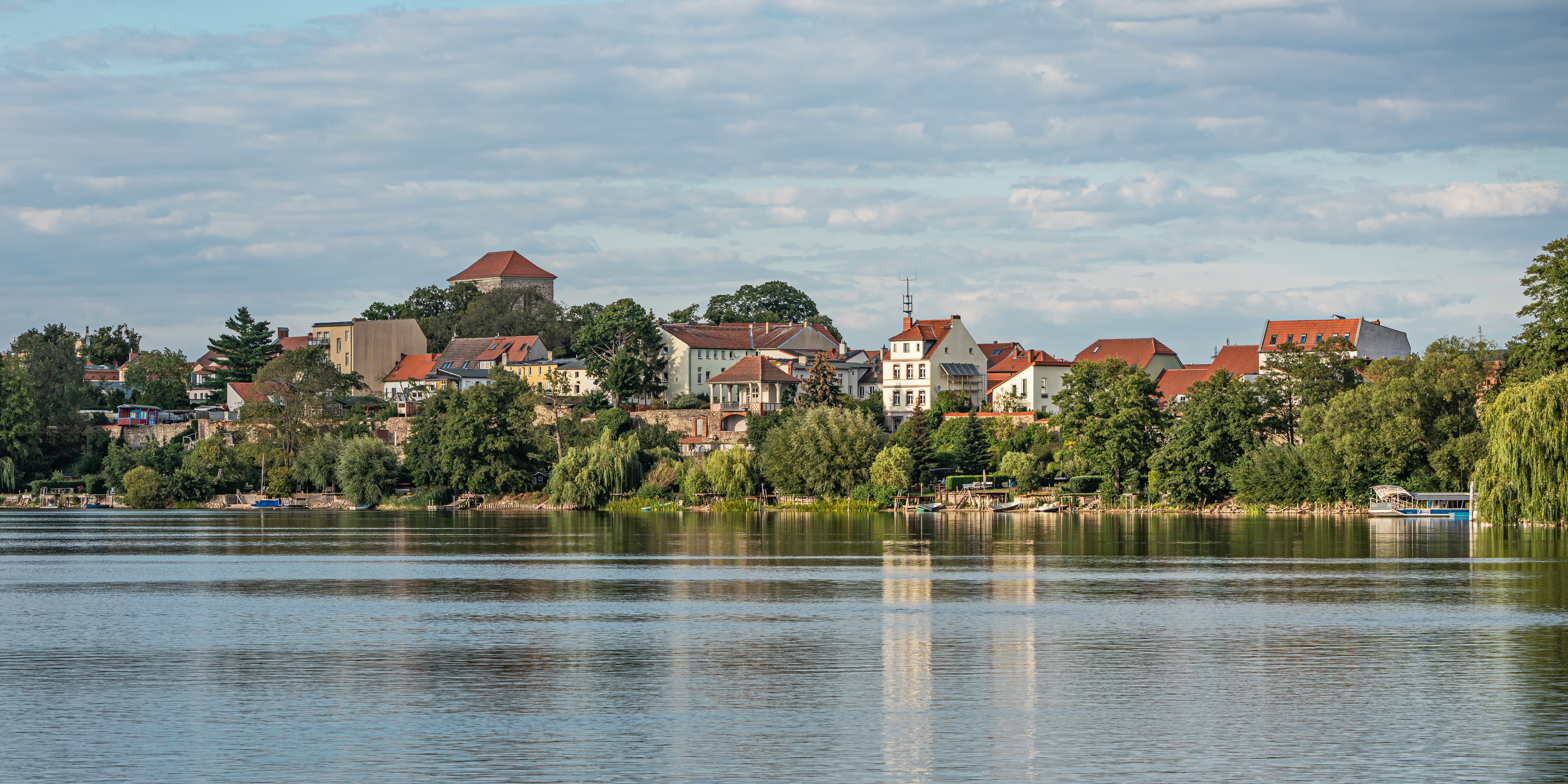
The Straussee

The Straussee Ferry (German: Strausseefähre) is a passenger cable ferry that crosses the Straussee lake, near the town of Strausberg in Brandenburg, Germany.

== Overview ==
The ferry service is operated by the Strausberg Railway, using the ferry Steffi, which can carry up to 100 passengers at a time. The ferry is unusual in that it is electrically operated, with an overhead supply at 230 volts. Although there are other operations of this type in the world, this operation is believed to be unique in Europe. The overhead wire for the power supply of the ferry is fixed on two lattice towers, one on the eastern shore of Straussee at the edge of the city of Strausberg and one on the western shore of Straussee at the edge of Strausberg forest. The distance between both towers is 369 metres making it to the longest span of an overhead wire used for vehicle power supply. The tower on the eastern shore, which also carries a clock, has a height of 9.6 metres and replaced in 2006 an older tower, while the tower on the western shore measures 9.7 metres in height and was erected in 1915. The minimum clearance of the overhead wire over Straussee is 5.8 metres.

The ferry service is numbered as route F39 by the Verkehrsverbund Berlin-Brandenburg (VBB), the joint transport association for the states of Berlin and Brandenburg. However it has its own fare structure and does accept the common tariff fares of the VBB.

== See also ==
- Ferry transport in Berlin
- Canby Ferry, an electrically driven cable ferry in Oregon, United States
- Princeton Ferry, an electrically driven cable ferry in California, United States (defunct)
