= S-Bahn Berlin GmbH =

Transport company in Berlin, Germany

- Industry: Rail transport
- Headquarters: Berlin, Germany
- Number of employees: 3,055 (2012)
- Parent: DB Regio (Deutsche Bahn)

The S-Bahn Berlin GmbH is the operator of the Berlin S-Bahn. The company was founded on 1 January 1995 as a wholly owned subsidiary of Deutsche Bahn.

== Background ==
At the turn of the year 1993/1994 the Deutsche Reichsbahn and the Deutsche Bundesbahn merged to form the Deutsche Bahn AG. At the same time, the operation of the S-Bahn in the former West Berlin – until then carried out by the Berliner Verkehrsbetriebe (BVG) – was taken over by the Reichsbahn (which already operated the S-Bahn in the eastern part of the city) and now by Deutsche Bahn. After the S-Bahn Berlin GmbH was founded in 1995, it took over the station and driving service personnel; workshop facilities and vehicles are also the property of the S-Bahn Berlin GmbH, while the stations, track systems, traction power supply and signalling technology remained the property of DB Station&Service and DB Netz.

Until around 2006/2007, Berlin's S-Bahn was considered a reliable urban railway system. Since then, there have been complaints of a steady decline in performance, which peaked in 2008, 2009 and 2010 with serious drops in performance. According to the Berlin Senate, the reasons are a combination of excessive rationalisation as a result of the pressure on returns exerted by the parent company, resulting maintenance deficits, a management failure of the S-Bahn management and constructional defects in the new vehicles.

In February 2018, a DB cross-company quality campaign S-Bahn PLUS was launched, in which S-Bahn Berlin GmbH, DB Netz AG, DB Station&Service AG and DB Energie GmbH are also involved. Its focus is on improving punctuality. From January to September 2019, this averaged 96.2% and was thus above the 96% mark stipulated in the transport agreement.

=== Results ===
The number of passengers has risen continuously since the company was founded. In 1995, it carried 246 million passengers; by 2001, it had already carried 296 million passengers, and in 2008, it carried 388 million passengers. In 2012, 395 million passengers used the S-Bahn and the S-Bahn achieved a turnover of 568 million euros.

The operational disruptions from 2009 onwards resulted in heavy losses. After a loss of 92.9 million euros in 2009, 222.2 million euros in 2010 and 41.6 million euros in 2011, the loss was reduced to 7.1 million euros in 2012.

=== Management Board ===
The first managing director of S-Bahn Berlin GmbH was Axel Nawrocki, who held office until 1998. He was succeeded as Chairman of the Management Board by Günter Ruppert, who had been responsible for the technical area of the S-Bahn since 1994. He was followed in May 2007 by Tobias Heinemann, who previously held marketing responsibilities at DB Regio, as Management Spokesman.

In July 2009, the incumbent management board was dismissed, which was held responsible for the operational disruptions caused by maintenance deficiencies. Since then, Peter Buchner has been the chairman of the management board.

=== Owner ===
After the S-Bahn Berlin GmbH was founded on 1 January 1995, it initially belonged to the DB Stadtverkehr business unit. Since March 2010 it has been wholly owned by DB Regio, which in turn is part of Deutsche Bahn.

== Transport contract and subsidies ==
=== Transport contract of 2004 ===
S-Bahn Berlin GmbH operates the S-Bahn's transport services on the basis of a tendering procedure for a transport contract signed in August 2004 between Deutsche Bahn and the Berlin Senate. The contract is valid retroactively from the beginning of 2003 to the end of 2017 and includes funds from the states of Berlin and Brandenburg amounting to 3.54 billion euros. Originally, the contract included the option that the state of Berlin could award the operation on the north-south lines in a tender as early as 2010. At the beginning of 2008, the Berlin Senate waived this option. The current transport contract provides for steadily increasing operating subsidies and kilometre charges. Accordingly, the kilometre charge will rise from 7.27 euros (2003) to 9.14 euros (2017). In addition to the fare, the S-Bahn Berlin will receive around 18 euros per train kilometre. Critics consider this level too high. Competition could limit the need for subsidies to a maximum of five euros per train kilometre.

Even before the contract was concluded, the contract had already been reviewed by the European Commission due to the lack of a call for tender.

Based on a question by Michael Cramer (Bündnis 90/Die Grünen), the transport policy spokesman of the Green Party in the European Parliament, the European Commission announced on 27 October 2009 that it would review the financing of the Berlin S-Bahn for a violation of EU state aid law. This could consist of the fact that the company operating the Berlin S-Bahn received around 232 million euros in subsidies from the State of Berlin in 2009 for operating the S-Bahn, but transferred 87 million euros as profit to Deutsche Bahn as parent company. This would violate the principle of European public procurement law, according to which state subsidies for a transport company may only cover its costs.

As a result of the S-Bahn crisis from 2009, the transport contract was amended with regard to sanctions and deductions for poor performance, extended requirements for quality improvement and billable requirements, e.g. for the use of vehicles or organisation and information in the event of disruptions. The amendment agreement was signed in October 2010.

=== Operation from 2017 ===
In 2012, the two federal states of Berlin and Brandenburg, as the responsible contracting authorities, decided to put the operation and maintenance of the S-Bahn Berlin out to public tender throughout Europe, and the Verkehrsverbund Berlin-Brandenburg (VBB) (Berlin-Brandenburg Transport Association) was awarded the contract. It was originally planned to carry out independent tenders for three sub-networks (Ring, Stadtbahn und Nord-Süd); the tender for the entire network was rejected because insufficient competition was to be expected in such an award due to the high risks involved. However, when the current transport contract expires in December 2017, Deutsche Bahn is to continue to award contracts directly to S-Bahn Berlin GmbH for two of the sub-networks, as a new operator of the network would have to buy new vehicles because the railway was not prepared to return trains. On the Berlin system with the lateral conductor rail and the weight restrictions on the trains, only specially developed vehicles can be used, which cannot be procured in the required number by 2017. In addition, S-Bahn Berlin GmbH is also applying for the tendered Ring sub-network in the award procedure that will start in April 2013.

=== Vehicle tendering ===
In November 2013, the company invited tenders for a framework agreement for the supply of new trains. The framework agreement provides for a possible purchase of up to 690 Viertelzüge. S-Bahn Berlin currently has around 650 Viertelzüge (as of 2013). If the S-Bahn Berlin GmbH is able to win the contract for the Ring sub-network, 195 quarter trains are to be called up for this purpose.

== Participation in tenders outside Berlin ==
In 2008, S-Bahn Berlin GmbH took part in the tender for the operation of the Stockholm Metro. However, the contract was awarded to MTR from Hong Kong.
