= S5 (Berlin) =

Overview
- Locale: Berlin
- Stations: strausberg nord to Olympia stadium

Service
- System: Berlin S-Bahn
- Operator(s): S-Bahn Berlin GmbH
- Rolling stock: DBAG Class 481

Technical
- Electrification: 750 V DC Third rail

S5 is a line on the Berlin S-Bahn. It operates from Strausberg Nord to Westkreuz over:

- the Strausberg–Strausberg Nord line, completed in 1955 and electrified in 1956,
- a section of the Prussian Eastern line, opened on 1 October 1866 and electrified on 6 November 1928,
- the Stadtbahn, opened on 7 February 1882 and electrified on 11 June 1928.

== Service history ==
The S5 was created on 2 June 1991, replacing the Orange route of the S3 between Westkreuz and Strausberg Nord, with the southwestern terminus extended to Wannsee.
