= List of railway stations in Brandenburg =

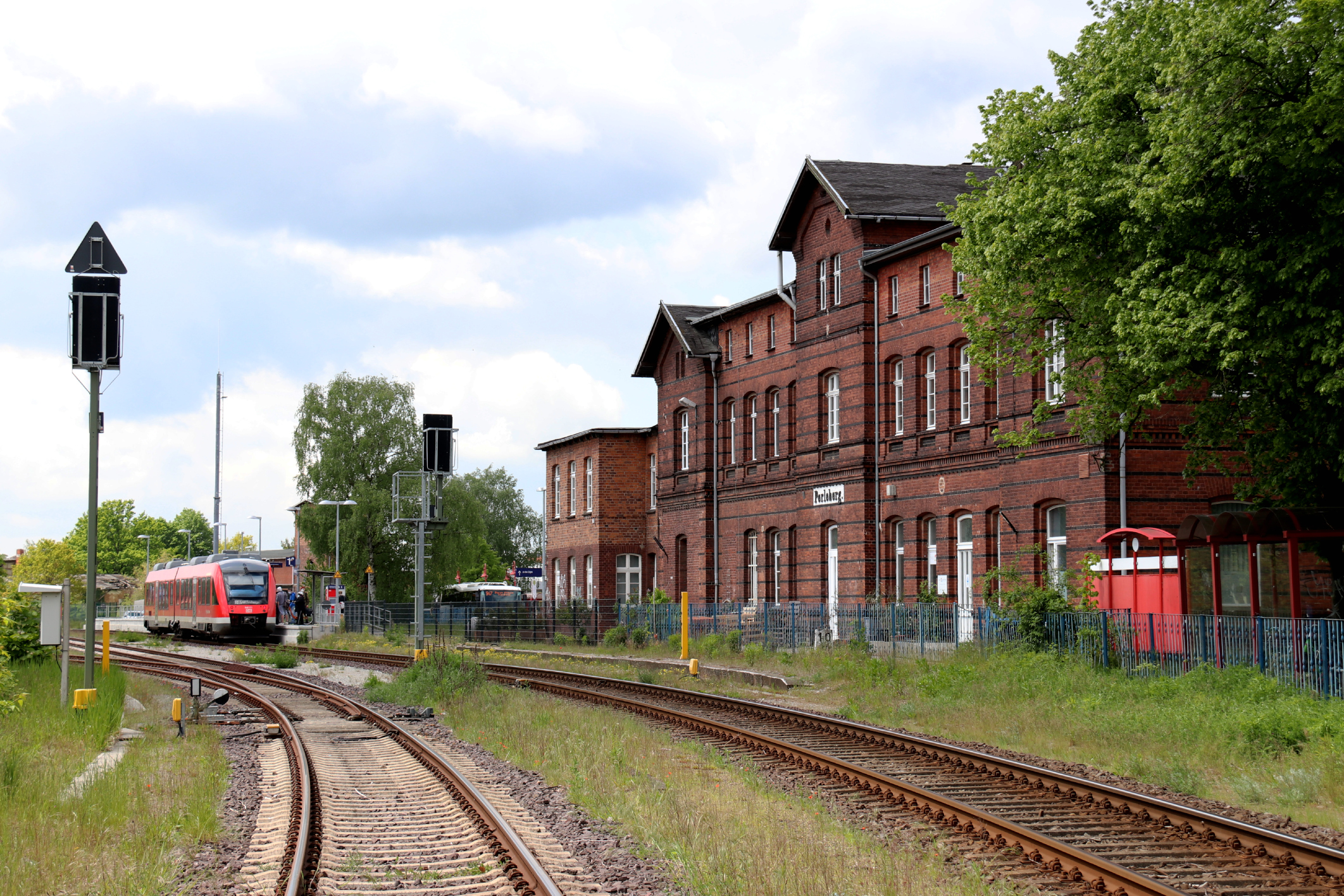
Perleberg station

This list covers all passenger railway stations and halts in Brandenburg that are used by scheduled and seasonal traffic.

== Description ==
The list is organised as follows:

- Name: the current name of the station or halt.
- Urban/Rural county (Kreis): This column shows the county in which the station is located. The abbreviations used correspond to those used for German car number plates. The individual counties in Brandenburg are:
- Barnim (BAR)
- Brandenburg (Havel) (BRB)
- Cottbus (CB)
- Dahme-Spreewald (LDS)
- Elbe-Elster (EE)
- Frankfurt (Oder) (FF)
- Havelland (HVL)
- Märkisch-Oderland (MOL)
- Oberhavel (OHV)
- Oberspreewald-Lausitz (OSL)
- Oder-Spree (LOS)
- Ostprignitz-Ruppin (OPR)
- Potsdam (P)
- Potsdam-Mittelmark (PM)
- Prignitz (PR)
- Spree-Neisse (SPN)
- Teltow-Fläming (TF)
- Uckermark (UM)
- Railway operator: Several stations in Brandenburg are run by the Verkehrsverbund Berlin-Brandenburg (VBB). In the border area with Saxony there are, however, also overlaps with the neighbouring Verkehrsverbund Oberelbe (VVO) and the Zweckverband Verkehrsverbund Oberlausitz-Niederschlesien (ZVON).
- Cat: The Cat column shows the current category of the station as at 1 January 2008. This only applies to stations run by the DB Station&Service and excludes stations runs by private operators like the Niederbarnimer Eisenbahn.
- The next five columns show which types of train stop at the station. The abbreviations are those used by the DB AG but apply to similar train types of other operators:
  - ICE – Intercity-Express and the like
  - IC – Intercity, Eurocity and the like, e.g. Interconnex
  - NJ – the Austrian sleeper train Nightjet
  - FLX – the private long distance train train Flixtrain
  - RE – Regional-Express and the like
  - RB – Regionalbahn and the like. In Brandenburg private operators use a different abbreviation from the DB Regio trains for trademark reasons. These are usually related to the name of the operator, e.g. NE27 is a train run by the Niederbarnimer Eisenbahn. A detailed explanation is given here: de:Eisenbahnen in Brandenburg und Berlin.
  - S – S-Bahn
- Line – This column gives the railway line on which the station is situated. Only those routes are named that are still in operation, e.g. the stations of Löwenberg (Mark) and Prenzlau are both on the Löwenberg–Prenzlau railway. Because this is only worked from Löwenberg to Templin it is not mentioned under Prenzlau.
- Remarks – In this column additional information is supplied, particularly with regard to the operators and seasonal services.

== Station overview ==
Station	City/ District (Kreis)	Railway operator	Cat	ICE	IC	RE	RB	S	Line	Remarks
Ahrensfelde Friedhof	BAR	VBB	6				x		Berlin–Wriezen	
Ahrensfelde Nord	BAR	VBB	6				x		Berlin–Wriezen	
Alt Rosenthal	MOL	VBB	6				x		Berlin–Kostrzyn	
Altdöbern	OSL	VBB	6				x		Lübbenau–Kamenz	
Altes Lager	TF	VBB	6				x		Jüterbog–Nauen	
Alt Hüttendorf	BAR	VBB	6				x		Britz–Fürstenberg	
Altranft	MOL	VBB	6				x		Eberswalde–Frankfurt	
Angermünde	UM	VBB	3		x	x	x		Angermünde–Schwedt; Angermünde–Stralsund railway Berlin–Szczecin	
Bad Freienwalde (Oder)	MOL	VBB	6				x		Eberswalde–Frankfurt	
Bad Liebenwerda	EE	VBB	6			x			Węgliniec–Roßlau	
Bad Saarow	LOS	VBB	7				x		Beeskow–Fürstenwalde	
Bad Wilsnack	PR	VBB	6			x			Berlin–Hamburg	
Bagenz	SPN	VBB	6				x		Berlin–Görlitz	
Bahnsdorf	OSL	VBB	6			x			Großenhain–Cottbus	
Baitz	PM	VBB	6			x			Berlin–Blankenheim	
Bärenklau	OHV	VBB	7				x		Berlin–Kremmen	
Baruth (Mark)	TF	VBB	6			x			Berlin–Dresden	
Basdorf	BAR	VBB					x		Basdorf–Liebenwalde; Berlin–Gross Schönebeck	Owner: NEB
Beelitz Stadt	PM	VBB	6				x		Jüterbog–Nauen	
Beelitz-Heilstätten	PM	VBB	6			x			Berlin–Blankenheim	
Beeskow	LOS	VBB	6				x		Königs Wusterhausen–Grunow	
Beetz-Sommerfeld	OHV	VBB	6			x			Kremmen–Meyenburg	
Belzig	PM	VBB	5			x			Berlin–Blankenheim	
Bergfelde (b Berlin)	OHV	VBB	4					x	Berlin Outer Ring Railway	
Bergsdorf	OHV	VBB	7				x		Löwenberg–Prenzlau	
Berkenbrück	LOS	VBB	6			x			Berlin–Guben	
BER Airport (Berlin Brandenburg Airport)	LDS	VBB	2	x	x	x	x	x	Glasower Damm Ost–Bohnsdorf Süd; Grünau Cross–BER	
Bernau (b Berlin)	BAR	VBB	3		x	x	x	x	Berlin–Szczecin	
Bernau-Friedenstal	BAR	VBB	5					x	Berlin–Szczecin	
Bestensee	LDS	VBB	6				x		Berlin–Görlitz	
Beutersitz	EE	VBB	6				x		Falkenberg–Cottbus	
Biesenthal	BAR	VBB	6				x		Berlin–Szczecin	
Birkengrund	TF	VBB	6			x			Berlin–Halle	
Birkenstein	MOL	VBB	5					x	Berlin–Kostrzyn	
Birkenwerder (b Berlin)	OHV	VBB	4				x	x	Berlin–Neustrelitz	
Blankenfelde (Kr. Teltow-Fläming)	TF	VBB	4			x		x	Berlin–Dresden	
Blönsdorf	TF	VBB	7			x			Berlin–Halle	
Blumberg (b Berlin)	BAR	VBB	6				x		Berlin–Wriezen	
Blumenthal (Mark)	OPR	VBB	6				x		Meyenburg–Neustadt	
Bölzke	PR	VBB	7				x		Meyenburg–Neustadt	
Borgsdorf	OHV	VBB	5					x	Berlin–Neustrelitz	
Borkheide	PM	VBB	6			x			Berlin–Blankenheim	
Brand (Niederlausitz)	LDS	VBB	5			x	x		Berlin–Görlitz	
Brandenburg Altstadt	BRB	VBB	7				x		Neustadt–Treuenbrietzen	
Brandenburg Hauptbahnhof	BRB	VBB	3		x	x	x		Berlin–Magdeburg; Neustadt–Treuenbrietzen	
Breddin	OPR	VBB	6			x			Berlin–Hamburg	
Brieselang	HVL	VBB	6				x		Berlin–Hamburg	
Briesen (Mark)	LOS	VBB	6			x			Berlin–Guben	
Britz	BAR	VBB	5			x	x		Berlin–Szczecin; Britz–Fürstenberg	
Brück (Mark)	PM	VBB	6			x			Berlin–Blankenheim	
Brügge (Prignitz)	PR	VBB	6				x		Meyenburg–Neustadt	
Buchholz (Zauche)	PM	VBB	7				x		Jüterbog–Nauen	
Buckow (b Beeskow)	LOS	VBB	6				x		Königs Wusterhausen–Grunow	
Buschow	HVL	VBB	7			x			Berlin–Lehrte	
Calau (Niederlausitz)	OSL	VBB	5			x	x		Falkenberg–Cottbus; Lübbenau–Kamenz	
Caputh-Geltow	PM	VBB	6				x		Jüterbog–Nauen	
Caputh-Schwielowsee	PM	VBB	6				x		Oranienburg–Jüterbog	
Casekow	UM	VBB	7				x		Berlin–Szczecin	
Chorin	BAR	VBB	6			x			Berlin–Szczecin	
Coschen	LOS	VBB	6			x			Berlin–Guben	
Cottbus	CB	VBB	2		x	x	x		Berlin–Görlitz; Cottbus–Guben; Cottbus–Żary; Falkenberg–Cottbus; Großenhain–Cottbus	
Cottbus-Merzdorf	CB	VBB	6			x			Cottbus–Guben	
Cottbus-Sandow	CB	VBB	6			x	x		Cottbus–Guben; Cottbus–Żary	
Cottbus-Willmersdorf Nord	CB	VBB	6			x			Cottbus–Guben	
Dabendorf	TF	VBB	5			x			Berlin–Dresden	
Dahlewitz	TF	VBB	5			x			Berlin–Dresden	
Dallgow-Döberitz	HVL	VBB	5			x	x		Berlin–Lehrte	
Dannenwalde	OHV	VBB	6			x			Berlin–Neustrelitz	
Döberitz	HVL	VBB	7				x		Neustadt–Treuenbrietzen	
Doberlug-Kirchhain	EE	VBB	4			x	x		Berlin–Dresden; Falkenberg–Cottbus	
Dossow (Prignitz)	OPR	VBB	7			x			Kremmen–Meyenburg	
Drahnsdorf	LDS	VBB	7			x			Berlin–Dresden	
Drebkau	SPN	VBB	6			x			Großenhain–Cottbus	
Eberswalde Hauptbahnhof	BAR	VBB	3		x	x	x		Berlin–Szczecin; Eberswalde–Frankfurt	
Eichwalde	LDS	VBB	5					x	Berlin–Görlitz	
Eisenhüttenstadt	LOS	VBB	5			x			Berlin–Guben	
Elsholz	PM	VBB	6				x		Jüterbog–Nauen	
Elstal	HVL	VBB	6			x	x		Berlin–Lehrte	
Elsterwerda	EE	VBB; VVO	4			x	x		Berlin–Dresden; Elsterwerda–Riesa	
Elsterwerda-Biehla	EE	VBB; VVO	5			x	x		Falkenberg–Horka	
Erkner	LOS	VBB	3			x		x	Berlin–Guben	
Falkenberg (Elster)	EE	VBB	3			x	x		Halle–Falkenberg; Falkenberg–Beeskow; Falkenberg–Cottbus; Węgliniec–Roßlau; Jüterbog–Riesa	
Falkenberg (Mark)	MOL	VBB	6				x		Eberswalde–Frankfurt	
Falkenhagen Gewerbepark Prignitz	PR	VBB					x		Meyenburg–Neustadt	Owner: PEG
Falkensee	HVL	VBB	5			x	x		Berlin–Hamburg	
Fangschleuse	LOS	VBB	6			x			Berlin–Guben	
Ferch-Lienewitz	PM	VBB	7				x		Jüterbog–Nauen	
Fermerswalde	EE	VBB	6				x		Węgliniec–Roßlau	
Finkenheerd	LOS	VBB	6			x			Berlin–Guben	
Finkenkrug	HVL	VBB	6				x		Berlin–Hamburg	
Finsterwalde (Niederlausitz)	EE	VBB	5			x	x		Falkenberg–Cottbus	
Fohrde	PM	VBB	7				x		Neustadt–Treuenbritzen	
Forst (Lausitz)	SPN	VBB	5		x		x		Cottbus–Żary	
Frankfurt (Oder)	FF	VBB	3		x	x	x		Berlin–Guben; Cottbus–Frankfurt; Eberswalde–Frankfurt; Poznań–Frankfurt	
Frankfurt (Oder)-Neuberesinchen	FF	VBB	7				x		Cottbus–Frankfurt	
Frankfurt (Oder)-Rosengarten	FF	VBB	6			x			Berlin–Guben	
Fredersdorf (b Berlin)	MOL	VBB	5					x	Berlin–Kostrzyn	
Fretzdorf	OPR	VBB	7			x			Kremmen–Meyenburg	
Friedersdorf (b Königs Wusterhausen)	LDS	VBB	5				x		Königs Wusterhausen–Grunow	
Friesack (Mark)	HVL	VBB	6			x			Berlin–Hamburg	
Fürstenberg (Havel)	OHV	VBB	5			x			Berlin–Neustrelitz	
Fürstenwalde (Spree)	LOS	VBB	4			x	x		Berlin–Guben; Beeskow–Fürstenwalde	
Fürstenwalde (Spree) Süd	LOS	VBB	7				x		Beeskow–Fürstenwalde	
Genshagener Heide	TF	VBB	6				x		Berlin Outer Ring Railway	
Glöwen	PR	VBB	6			x			Berlin–Hamburg	
Gollmitz (Niederlausitz)	OSL	VBB	7				x		Falkenberg–Cottbus	
Golm	P	VBB	5				x		Berlin Outer Ring Railway; Jüterbog–Nauen	
Golssen (Niederlausitz)	LDS	VBB	6			x			Berlin–Dresden	
Golzow (b Eberswalde)	BAR	VBB	6				x		Britz–Fürstenberg	
Golzow (Oderbruch)	MOL	VBB	6				x		Berlin–Kostrzyn	
Görden	BRB	VBB	7				x		Neustadt–Treuenbritzen	
Gorgast	MOL	VBB	6				x		Berlin–Kostrzyn	
Götz	PM	VBB	6			x			Berlin–Magdeburg	
Gransee	OHV	VBB	5			x			Berlin–Neustrelitz	
Griebnitzsee	P	VBB	4				x	x	Berlin–Magdeburg; Wannseebahn	
Gross Köris	LDS	VBB	5				x		Berlin–Görlitz	
Gross Kreutz	PM	VBB	6			x			Berlin–Magdeburg	
Gross Langerwisch	PR	VBB	6				x		Pritzwalk–Suckow	Owner: PEG; School services Mon-Fri
Gross Pankow	PR	VBB	6			x			Wittenberge–Strasburg	
Gross Schönebeck (Schorfheide)	BAR	VBB					x		Berlin–Gross Schönebeck	Owner: NEB
Grossbeeren	TF	VBB	6			x			Berlin–Halle	
Grossräschen	OSL	VBB	6				x		Lübbenau–Kamenz	
Grosswudicke	HVL	VBB	7				x		Berlin–Lehrte	
Grüneberg	OHV	VBB	6				x		Berlin–Neustrelitz	
Grunow (Niederlausitz)	LOS	VBB	6				x		Cottbus–Frankfurt; Königs Wusterhausen–Grunow	
Guben	SPN	VBB	5			x			Berlin–Guben; Cottbus–Guben	
Halbe	LDS	VBB	6				x		Berlin–Görlitz	
Hammelspring	UM	VBB	7				x		Löwenberg–Prenzlau	
Hangelsberg	LOS	VBB	6			x			Berlin–Guben	
Hegermühle	MOL	VBB	6					x	Strausberg–Strausberg Nord	
Heiligengrabe	OPR	VBB	7			x			Wittenberge–Strasburg	
Helenesee	FF	VBB	6				x		Cottbus–Frankfurt	Seasonal halt
Hennigsdorf (b Berlin)	OHV	VBB	3			x	x	x	Berlin–Kremmen	
Herrensee	MOL	VBB	6				x		Berlin–Kostrzyn	
Herzberg (Elster) West	EE	VBB	6			x			Jüterbog–Riesa	
Herzberg (Mark)	OPR	VBB	7				x		Löwenberg–Rheinsberg	Summer daily Winter: Fri–Sun only
Hohen Neuendorf (b Berlin)	OHV	VBB	5					x	Berlin–Neustrelitz	
Hohen Neuendorf West	OHV	VBB	6				x		Berlin Outer Ring Railway	
Hohenleipisch	EE	VBB	6			x			Berlin–Dresden	
Hoppegarten (Mark)	MOL	VBB	4					x	Berlin–Kostrzyn	
Hosena	OSL	VBB; VVO	5			x	x		Lübbenau–Kamenz; Węgliniec–Roßlau	
Hubertushöhe	LOS	VBB	6				x		Königs Wusterhausen–Grunow	
Jacobsdorf (Mark)	LOS	VBB	6			x			Berlin–Guben	
Jakobsdorf (Prignitz)	PR	VBB					x		Pritzwalk–Suckow	Owner: PEG; School services Mon-Fri
Jänschwalde	SPN	VBB	6			x			Cottbus–Guben	
Jänschwalde Ost	SPN	VBB	6			x			Cottbus–Guben	
Joachimsthal	BAR	VBB	6				x		Britz–Fürstenberg	
Joachimsthal Kaiserbahnhof	BAR	VBB	6				x		Britz–Fürstenberg	
Jüterbog	TF	VBB	4			x	x		Berlin–Halle; Jüterbog–Riesa; Jüterbog–Nauen	
Kablow	LDS	VBB	7				x		Königs Wusterhausen–Grunow	
Karstädt	PR	VBB	6			x			Berlin–Hamburg	
Kerkwitz	SPN	VBB	6			x			Cottbus–Guben	
Kirchmöser	BRB	VBB	6			x			Berlin–Magdeburg	
Klandorf	BAR	VBB					x		Berlin–Gross Schönebeck	Owner: NEB
Klasdorf-Glashütte	TF	VBB	6			x			Berlin–Dresden	
Klein Rössen	EE	VBB							Falkenberg–Beeskow	Owner: DRE; Seasonal traffic
Klinge	SPN	VBB	6				x		Cottbus–Żary	
Klosterfelde	BAR	VBB					x		Berlin–Gross Schönebeck	Owner: NEB
Kolkwitz	SPN	VBB	6			x			Berlin–Görlitz	
Kolkwitz Süd	SPN	VBB	6				x		Falkenberg–Cottbus	
Königs Wusterhausen	LDS	VBB	4			x	x	x	Berlin–Görlitz; Königs Wusterhausen–Grunow	
Kraftwerk Finkenheerd	LOS	VBB	6			x			Berlin–Guben	
Kremmen	OHV	VBB	6			x	x		Berlin–Kremmen; Kremmen–Meyenburg	
Kuhbier	PR	VBB					x		Pritzwalk–Suckow	Owner: PEG; School services Mon-Fri
Kummersdorf (b Beeskow)	LOS	VBB	6				x		Königs Wusterhausen–Grunow	
Kunersdorf	SPN	VBB	6			x			Berlin–Görlitz	
Küstrin-Kietz	MOL	VBB	6				x		Berlin–Kostrzyn	
Kyritz	OPR	VBB	6				x		Meyenburg–Neustadt	
Laaske	PR	VBB					x		Pritzwalk–Suckow	Owner: PEG; School services Mon-Fri
Lauchhammer	OSL	VBB	6			x			Węgliniec–Roßlau	
Lehnitz	OHV	VBB	5					x	Berlin–Neustrelitz	
Letschin	MOL	VBB	6				x		Eberswalde–Frankfurt	
Leuthen (b Cottbus)	SPN	VBB	6			x			Großenhain–Cottbus	
Liebenthal (Prignitz)	OPR	VBB	7			x			Wittenberge–Strasburg	
Lindenberg (Mark)	LOS	VBB	6				x		Königs Wusterhausen–Grunow	
Lindow (Mark)	OPR	VBB	6				x		Löwenberg–Rheinsberg	Summer daily Winter: Fri–Sun only
Lottschesee	BAR	VBB					x		Berlin–Gross Schönebeck	Owner: NEB
Löwenberg (Mark)	OHV	VBB	5			x	x		Berlin–Neustrelitz; Löwenberg–Prenzlau; Löwenberg–Rheinsberg	
Lübben (Spreewald)	LDS	VBB	4		x	x	x		Berlin–Görlitz	
Lübbenau (Spreewald)	OSL	VBB	4		x	x	x		Berlin–Görlitz; Lübbenau–Kamenz	
Lubolz	LDS	VBB	6				x		Berlin–Görlitz	
Luckaitztal	OSL	VBB	6				x		Lübbenau–Kamenz	
Luckau-Uckro	LDS	VBB	6			x			Berlin–Dresden; Falkenberg–Beeskow	
Luckenwalde	TF	VBB	5			x			Berlin–Halle	
Ludwigsfelde	TF	VBB	4			x			Berlin–Halle	
Ludwigsfelde-Struveshof	TF	VBB	6				x		Berlin outer ring	
Mahlow	TF	VBB	5					x	Berlin–Dresden	
Marquardt	P	VBB	6				x		Berlin Outer Ring Railway; Jüterbog–Nauen	
Medewitz (Mark)	PM	VBB	6			x			Wiesenburg–Rosslau	
Melchow	BAR	VBB	6				x		Berlin–Szczecin	
Meyenburg	PR	VBB	6				x		Meyenburg–Neustadt	
Michendorf	PM	VBB	4			x	x		Berlin–Blankenheim	
Mixdorf	LOS	VBB	6				x		Cottbus–Frankfurt	
Mögelin	HVL	VBB	7				x		Neustadt–Treuenbritzen	
Mühlenbeck-Mönchmühle	OHV	VBB	5					x	Berlin Outer Ring Railway	
Müllrose	LOS	VBB	6				x		Cottbus–Frankfurt	
Müncheberg (Mark)	MOL	VBB	6				x		Berlin–Kostrzyn; Müncheberg–Buckow	
Nassenheide	OHV	VBB	6				x		Berlin–Neustrelitz	
Nauen	HVL	VBB	3			x	x		Berlin–Hamburg	
Nechlin	UM	VBB	7			x			Angermünde–Stralsund	
Nennhausen	HVL	VBB	6			x			Berlin–Lehrte	
Netzeband	OPR	VBB	7			x			Kremmen–Meyenburg	
Neuenhagen (b Berlin)	MOL	VBB	6					x	Berlin–Kostrzyn	
Neuhausen (b Cottbus)	SPN	VBB	6				x		Berlin–Görlitz	
Neuhof (b Zossen)	TF	VBB	6			x			Berlin–Dresden	
Neupetershain	OSL	VBB	5			x			Großenhain–Cottbus	
Neuruppin Rheinsberger Tor	OPR	VBB	5			x			Kremmen–Meyenburg	
Neuruppin West	OPR	VBB	6			x			Kremmen–Meyenburg	
Neustadt (Dosse)	OPR	VBB	5			x	x		Berlin–Hamburg; Meyenburg–Neustadt	
Neutrebbin	MOL	VBB	6				x		Eberswalde–Frankfurt	
Neuzelle	LOS	VBB	5			x			Berlin–Guben	
Niederfinow	BAR	VBB	6				x		Eberswalde–Frankfurt	
Niedergörsdorf	TF	VBB	6			x			Berlin–Halle	
Niederlehme	LDS	VBB	7				x		Königs Wusterhausen–Grunow	
Obersdorf	MOL	VBB	6				x		Berlin–Kostrzyn	
Oderin	LDS	VBB	6				x		Berlin–Görlitz	
Oegeln	LOS	VBB	7				x		Königs Wusterhausen–Grunow	
Oehna	TF	VBB	6				x		Jüterbog–Riesa	
Oranienburg	OHV	VBB	3			x	x	x	Berlin–Neustrelitz	
Ortrand	OSL	VBB; VVO	6			x			Großenhain–Cottbus	
Passow (Uckermark)	UM	VBB	6				x		Berlin–Szczecin	
Paulinenaue	HVL	VBB	6			x			Berlin–Hamburg	
Peitz Ost	SPN	VBB	6			x			Cottbus–Guben	
Perleberg	PR	VBB	6			x			Wittenberge–Strasburg	
Petershagen (Uckermark)	UM	VBB	6				x		Berlin–Szczecin	
Petershagen Nord	MOL	VBB	4					x	Berlin–Kostrzyn	
Pillgram	LOS	VBB	6			x			Berlin–Guben	
Pinnow (Uckermark)	UM	VBB	6				x		Angermünde–Schwedt	
Plessa	EE	VBB	6			x			Węgliniec–Roßlau	
Potsdam-Babelsberg	P	VBB	5			x	x	x	Wannseebahn	
Potsdam Charlottenhof	P	VBB	4			x	x		Berlin–Magdeburg	
Potsdam Hauptbahnhof	P	VBB	2	x	x	x	x	x	Berlin–Magdeburg; Wannseebahn	
Potsdam Medienstadt Babelsberg	P	VBB	5			x	x		Berlin–Blankenheim	
Potsdam Park Sanssouci	P	VBB	4				x		Jüterbog–Nauen	
Potsdam Pirschheide	P	VBB	6				x		Jüterbog–Nauen	
Potsdam-Rehbrücke	PM	VBB	6			x	x		Berlin–Blankenheim	
Premnitz Nord	HVL	VBB	7				x		Neustadt–Treuenbritzen	
Premnitz Zentrum	HVL	VBB	7				x		Neustadt–Treuenbritzen	
Prenzlau	UM	VBB	5		x	x			Angermünde-Stralsund	
Priort	HVL	VBB	6				x		Berlin Outer Ring Railway; Jüterbog–Nauen	
Pritzerbe	PM	VBB	6				x		Neustadt–Treuenbritzen	
Pritzwalk	PR	VBB	5			x	x		Meyenburg–Neustadt; Pritzwalk–Suckow; Wittenberge–Strasburg	
Pritzwalk West	PR	VBB					x		Pritzwalk–Suckow	Owner: PEG; School services Mon-Fri
Pritzwalk-Hainholz	PR	VBB					x		Meyenburg–Neustadt	Owner: PEG; Special occasions
Prösen	EE	VBB; VVO	6				x		Elsterwerda–Riesa	
Prösen Ost	EE	VBB; VVO	6				x		Berlin–Dresden	
Prösen West	EE	VBB; VVO	6				x		Elsterwerda–Riesa	
Putlitz	PR	VBB					x		Pritzwalk–Suckow	Owner: PEG; School services Mon-Fri
Raddusch	OSL	VBB	6			x			Berlin–Görlitz	
Rangsdorf	TF	VBB	4			x			Berlin–Dresden	
Rathenow	HVL	VBB	3		x	x	x		Berlin–Lehrte; Neustadt–Treuenbrietzen	
Rehfeld (b Falkenberg/Elster)	EE	VBB	6			x			Halle–Falkenberg	
Rehfelde	MOL	VBB	6				x		Berlin–Kostrzyn	
Rheinsberg (Mark)	OPR	VBB	6				x		Löwenberg–Rheinsberg	Summer daily Winter: Fri–Sun only
Rochau-Forst	LDS	VBB							Falkenberg–Beeskow	Owner: DRE; Seasonal traffic
Röntgental	BAR	VBB	4					x	Berlin–Szczecin	
Rosenwinkel	OPR	VBB	7				x		Meyenburg–Neustadt	
Rückersdorf	EE	VBB	7			x			Berlin–Dresden	
Rüdnitz	BAR	VBB	6				x		Berlin–Szczecin	
Ruhland	OSL	VBB; VVO	4			x			Węgliniec–Roßlau; Großenhain–Cottbus	
Ruhlsdorf-Zerpenschleuse	BAR	VBB					x		Berlin–Gross Schönebeck	Owner: NEB
Saarmund	PM	VBB	6				x		Berlin Outer Ring Railway	
Sachsenhausen (Nordbahn)	OHV	VBB	6				x		Berlin–Neustrelitz	
Sarnow	PR	VBB	7				x		Meyenburg–Neustadt	
Schlieben	EE	VBB							Falkenberg–Beeskow	Owner: DRE; Seasonal traffic
Schmachtenhagen	OHV	VBB					x		Wensickendorf–Schmachtenhagen	Owner: NEB; Only Sa+Su
Schneeberg (Mark)	LOS	VBB	7				x		Königs Wusterhausen–Grunow	
Schönborn (b Doberlug)	EE	VBB	6				x		Falkenberg–Cottbus	
Schönefeld (bei Berlin)	LDS	VBB	3			x	x	x	Berlin outer ring Grünau Cross–BER	
Schönerlinde	BAR	VBB					x		Berlin–Gross Schönebeck	Owner: NEB
Schönfliess	OHV	VBB	5					x	Berlin Outer Ring Railway	
Schönfliess Dorf	MOL	VBB	6				x		Eberswalde–Frankfurt	Request stop
Schönow (Kr Uckermark)	UM	VBB	7				x		Berlin–Szczecin	
Schönwalde (Barnim)	BAR	VBB					x		Berlin–Gross Schönebeck	Owner: NEB
Schönwalde (Spreewald)	LDS	VBB	6				x		Berlin–Görlitz	
Schwante	OHV	VBB	7				x		Berlin–Kremmen	
Schwarzheide Ost	OSL	VBB	6			x			Großenhain–Cottbus	
Schwedt (Oder)	UM	VBB	6				x		Angermünde–Schwedt	
Schwedt (Oder) Mitte	UM	VBB	6			x			Angermünde–Schwedt	
Seddin	PM	VBB	5			x	x		Berlin–Blankenheim	
Sedlitz Ost	OSL	VBB	6			x	x		Lübbenau–Kamenz; Großenhain–Cottbus	
Seefeld (Mark)	BAR	VBB	6				x		Berlin–Wriezen	
Seegefeld	HVL	VBB	5				x		Berlin–Hamburg	
Seehausen (Uckermark)	UM	VBB	7			x			Angermünde–Stralsund	
Seelow (Mark)	MOL	VBB	6				x		Eberswalde–Frankfurt	
Seelow-Gusow	MOL	VBB	6				x		Berlin–Kostrzyn	
Senftenberg	OSL	VBB	5			x	x		Lübbenau–Kamenz; Großenhain–Cottbus	
Spremberg	SPN	VBB; ZVON	5				x		Berlin–Görlitz	
Storkow (Mark)	LOS	VBB	6				x		Königs Wusterhausen–Grunow	
Strausberg	MOL	VBB	4				x	x	Berlin–Kostrzyn; Strausberg–Strausberg Nord	
Strausberg Nord	MOL	VBB	6					x	Strausberg–Strausberg Nord	
Strausberg Stadt	MOL	VBB	6					x	Strausberg–Strausberg Nord	
Tantow	UM	VBB	7				x		Berlin–Szczecin	
Teichland	SPN	VBB	7			x			Cottbus–Guben	
Teltow	PM	VBB	6			x			Berlin–Halle	
Teltow Stadt	PM	VBB	5					x	Berlin-Lichterfelde Süd–Teltow Stadt railway	
Templin	UM	VBB	5				x		Löwenberg–Prenzlau	
Templin Stadt	UM	VBB	6				x		Löwenberg–Prenzlau	
Thyrow	TF	VBB	6			x			Berlin–Halle	
Trebbin	TF	VBB	5			x			Berlin–Halle	
Trebnitz (Mark)	MOL	VBB	6				x		Berlin–Kostrzyn	
Treuenbrietzen	PM	VBB	7				x		Jüterbog–Nauen	
Treuenbrietzen Süd	PM	VBB	7				x		Jüterbog–Nauen	
Uebigau	EE	VBB	6				x		Falkenberg–Cottbus	
Vehlefanz	OHV	VBB	7				x		Berlin–Kremmen	
Velten (Mark)	OHV	VBB	5			x	x		Berlin–Kremmen	
Vetschau	OSL	VBB	6			x			Berlin–Görlitz	
Vogelsang (Kr Gransee)	OHV	VBB	6				x		Löwenberg–Prenzlau	
Walddrehna	LDS	VBB	7			x			Berlin–Dresden	
Walsleben	OPR	VBB	7			x			Kremmen–Meyenburg	
Wandlitz	BAR	VBB					x		Berlin–Gross Schönebeck	Owner: NEB
Wandlitzsee	BAR	VBB					x		Berlin–Gross Schönebeck	Owner: NEB
Warnitz (Uckermark)	UM	VBB	6			x			Angermünde–Stralsund	
Waßmannsdorf	LDS	VBB	6					x	Berlin Outer Ring Railway	under construction
Weisen	PR	VBB	6			x			Wittenberge–Strasburg	
Wellmitz	PR	VBB	6			x			Berlin–Guben	
Wendisch-Rietz	LOS	VBB	6				x		Königs Wusterhausen–Grunow	
Wensickendorf	OHV	VBB					x		Basdorf–Liebenwalde; Wensickendorf–Schmachtenhagen	Owner: NEB
Werbig	MOL	VBB	6				x		Berlin–Kostrzyn; Eberswalde–Frankfurt	
Werder (Havel)	PM	VBB	4			x			Berlin–Magdeburg	
Werneuchen	BAR	VBB	6				x		Berlin–Wriezen	
Wiesenau	LOS	VBB	6			x			Berlin–Guben	
Wiesenburg (Mark)	PM	VBB	5			x			Berlin–Blankenheim; Wiesenburg–Rosslau	
Wildau	LDS	VBB	5					x	Berlin–Görlitz	
Wilhelmshorst	PM	VBB	5			x	x		Berlin–Blankenheim	
Wilmersdorf (b Angermünde)	UM	VBB	6			x			Angermünde–Stralsund	
Wittenberge	PR	VBB	3	x	x	x	x		Berlin–Hamburg; Magdeburg–Wittenberge; Wittenberge–Strasburg	
Wittmannsdorf (Niederlausitz)	LDS	VBB							Falkenberg–Beeskow	Owner: DRE; Seasonal traffic
Wittstock (Dosse)	OPR	VBB	6			x			Kremmen–Meyenburg; Wittenberge–Strasburg	
Woltersdorf (b Luckenwalde)	TF	VBB	6			x			Berlin–Halle	
Wriezen	MOL	VBB	6				x		Eberswalde–Frankfurt	
Wünsdorf-Waldstadt	TF	VBB	4			x			Berlin–Dresden	
Wusterhausen (Dosse)	OPR	VBB	7				x		Meyenburg–Neustadt	
Wustermark	HVL	VBB	5			x	x		Berlin–Lehrte; Jüterbog–Nauen	
Wusterwitz	PM	VBB	6			x			Berlin–Magdeburg	
Wustrau-Radensleben	OPR	VBB	7			x			Kremmen–Meyenburg	
Wutike	PR	VBB	6				x		Meyenburg–Neustadt	
Zeesen	LDS	VBB	6				x		Berlin–Görlitz	
Zehdenick (Mark)	OHV	VBB	6				x		Löwenberg–Prenzlau	
Zehdenick-Neuhof	OHV	VBB	7				x		Löwenberg–Prenzlau	
Zepernick (b Bernau)	BAR	VBB	5					x	Berlin–Szczecin	
Zernsdorf	LDS	VBB	6				x		Königs Wusterhausen–Grunow	
Zeuthen	LDS	VBB	5					x	Berlin–Görlitz	
Ziltendorf	LOS	VBB	6			x			Berlin–Guben	
Zossen	TF	VBB	5			x			Berlin–Dresden	
Zühlsdorf	OHV	VBB					x		Basdorf–Liebenwalde	Owner: NEB

== See also ==
- German railway station categories
- Railway station types of Germany
- List of railway stations in the Berlin area
