= Walddrehna station =

Railway station in Heideblick, Germany

Walddrehna
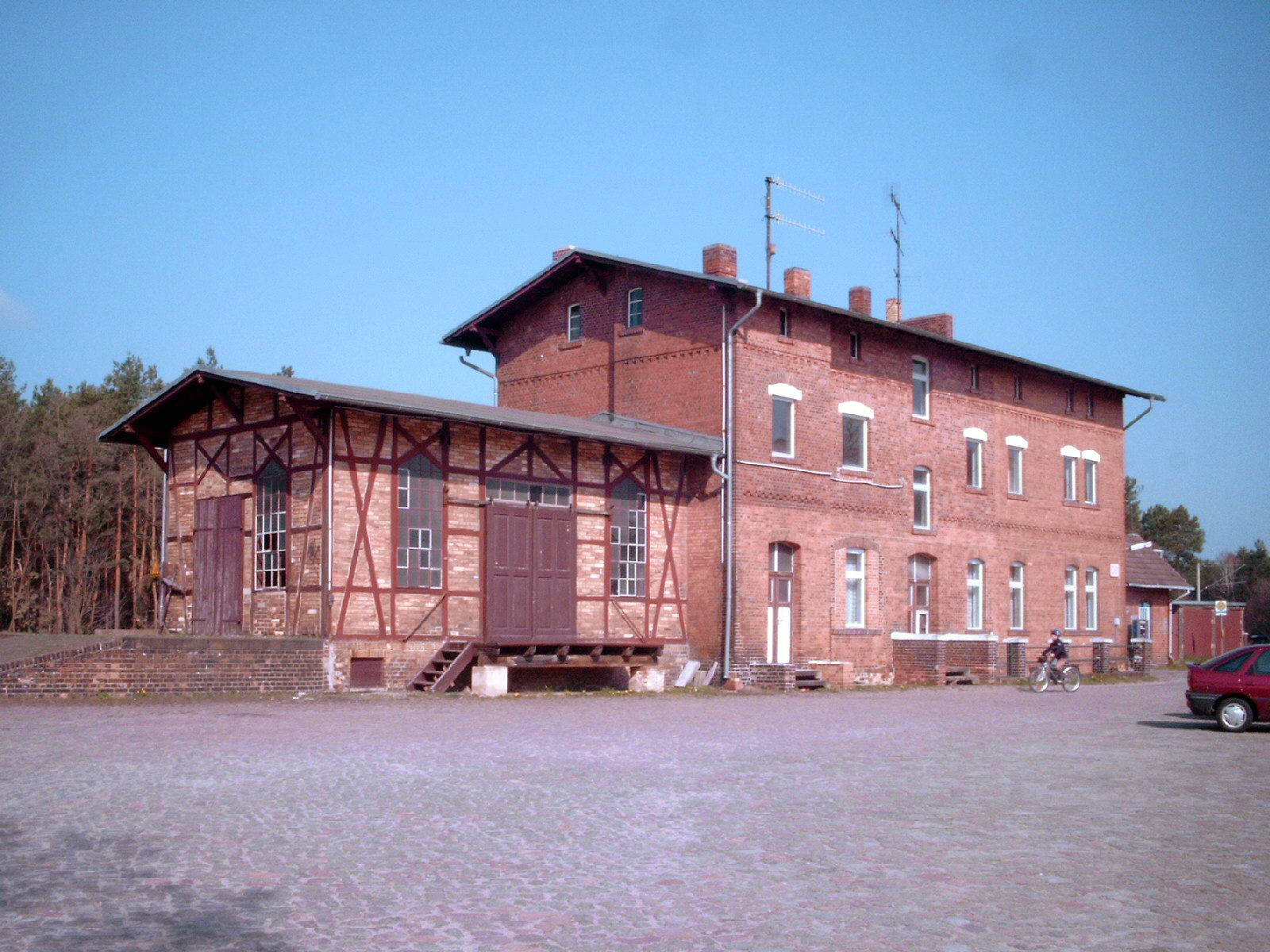
- Walddrehna railway station

General information
- Location: Walddrehna, Brandenburg; Germany
- Coordinates: 51°46′22″N 13°37′01″E
- Line: Berlin–Dresden railway
- Platforms: 2
- Tracks: 2

Construction
- Accessible: Yes

Other information
- Station code: 6479
- DS100 code: BWA
- Category: 7
- Fare zone: VBB: 7259
- Website: www.bahnhof.de

History
- Opened: 17 June 1875

Services
Preceding station	Ostdeutsche Eisenbahn	Following station
Luckau-Uckro towards Wismar	RE 8	Doberlug-Kirchhain towards Elsterwerda
Location
- Location within Brandenburg

Walddrehna (German: Bahnhof Walddrehna) is a railway station opened in 1875 in the village of Walddrehna, Brandenburg, Germany. The station lies of the Berlin–Dresden railway and the train services are operated by Ostdeutsche Eisenbahn.

The station is served by the following service:

RE 8 Berlin – Berlin Südkreuz – Wünsdorf-Waldstadt – Walddrehna – Elsterwerda

== See also ==
- List of railway stations in Brandenburg
