= Cottbus-Willmersdorf Nord station =

Railway station in Germany

Cottbus Willmersdorf Nord
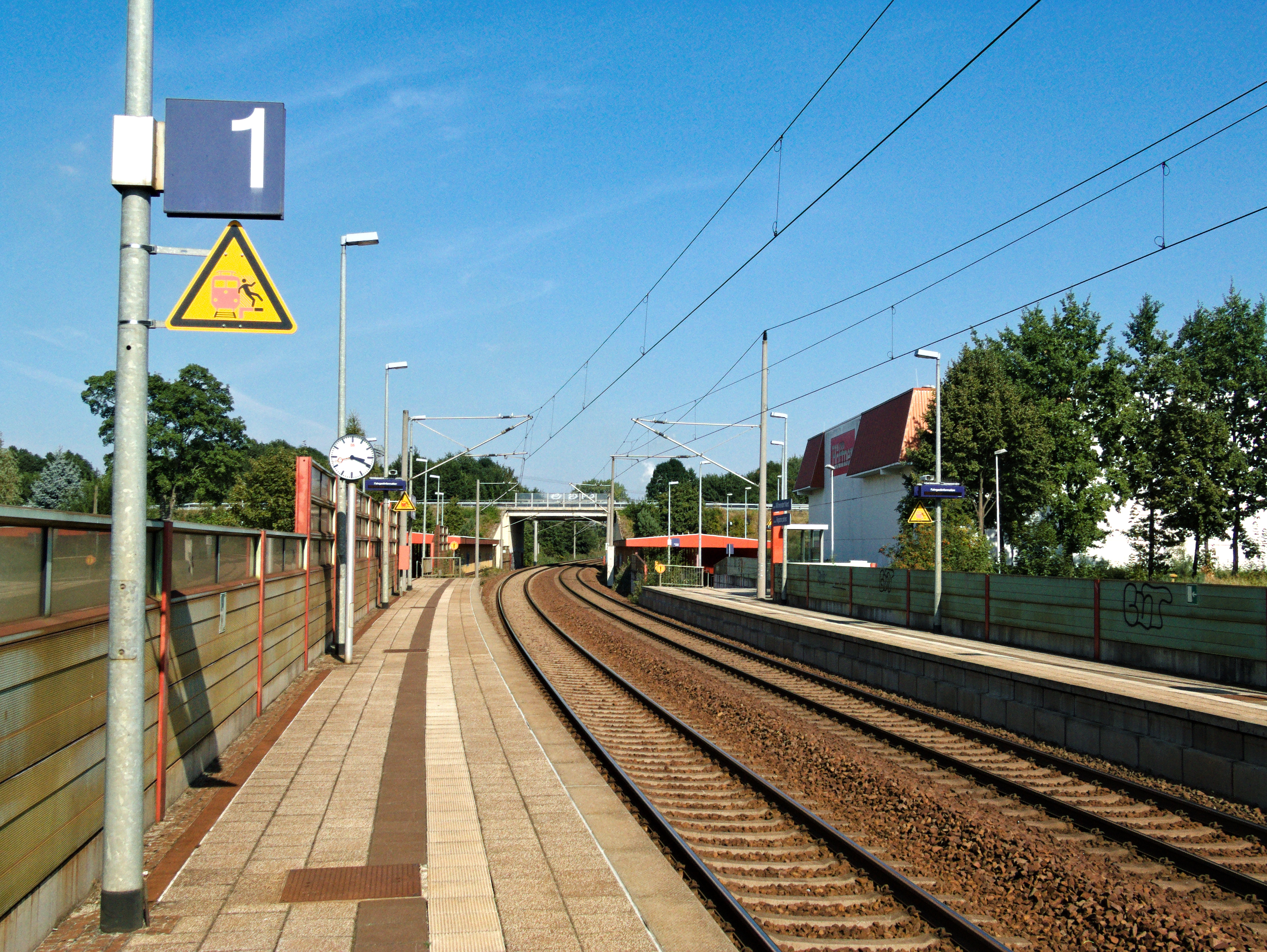
- 2016

General information
- Location: Straße der Freiheit; Alte Lindenstraße; 03053 Cottbus; Brandenburg; Germany
- Coordinates: 51.8162°N 14.3850°E
- Owner: Deutsche Bahn
- Operator: DB Station&Service
- Lines: Cottbus–Guben railway (KBS 211)
- Platforms: 2 side platforms
- Tracks: 2
- Train operators: DB Regio Nordost

Construction
- Parking: no
- Cycle facilities: no
- Accessible: yes

Other information
- Station code: 6781
- DS100 code: BWDF
- IBNR: 8081688
- Category: 6
- Fare zone: VBB: Cottbus B/7271
- Website: www.bahnhof.de

Services
Preceding station	DB Regio Nordost	Following station
Cottbus-Merzdorf towards Leipzig Hbf	RE 10	Teichland towards Frankfurt (Oder)
Cottbus-Merzdorf towards Herzberg (Elster)	RB 43	Teichland towards Frankfurt (Oder)
Location

Cottbus-Willmersdorf Nord station is a railway station in the Willmersdorf district in the town of Cottbus, located in Brandenburg, Germany.
