= Cottbus-Merzdorf station =

Railway station in Brandenburg, Germany

Cottbus Merzdorf Chóśebuz Žylowk
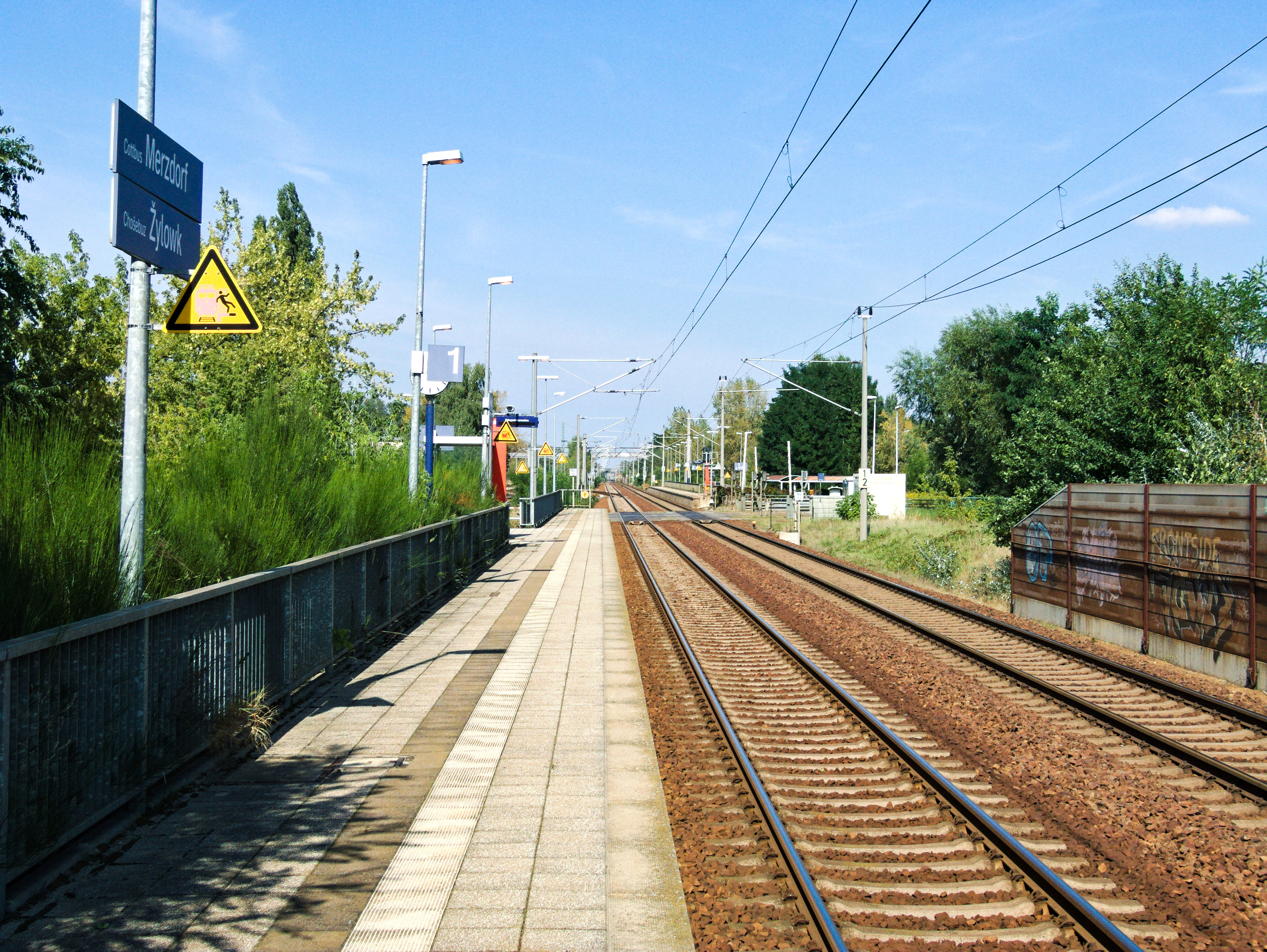
- 2016

General information
- Location: Merzdorfer Weg; 03042 Cottbus; Brandenburg; Germany
- Coordinates: 51.7697°N 14.3669°E
- Owner: DB Netz
- Operator: DB Station&Service
- Lines: Cottbus–Guben railway (KBS 211)
- Platforms: 2 side platforms
- Tracks: 2
- Train operators: DB Regio Nordost

Other information
- Station code: 4074
- DS100 code: BMZD
- IBNR: 8012341
- Category: 6
- Fare zone: VBB: Cottbus B/7271
- Website: www.bahnhof.de

Services
Preceding station	DB Regio Nordost	Following station
Cottbus-Sandow towards Leipzig Hbf	RE 10	Cottbus-Willmersdorf Nord towards Frankfurt (Oder)
Cottbus-Sandow towards Herzberg (Elster)	RB 43	Cottbus-Willmersdorf Nord towards Frankfurt (Oder)
Location

Cottbus-Merzdorf station is a railway station in the Merzdorf district in the town of Cottbus, located in Brandenburg, Germany.
