= Frankfurt (Oder)-Neuberesinchen station =

Railway station in Germany

Frankfurt (Oder) Neuberesinchen
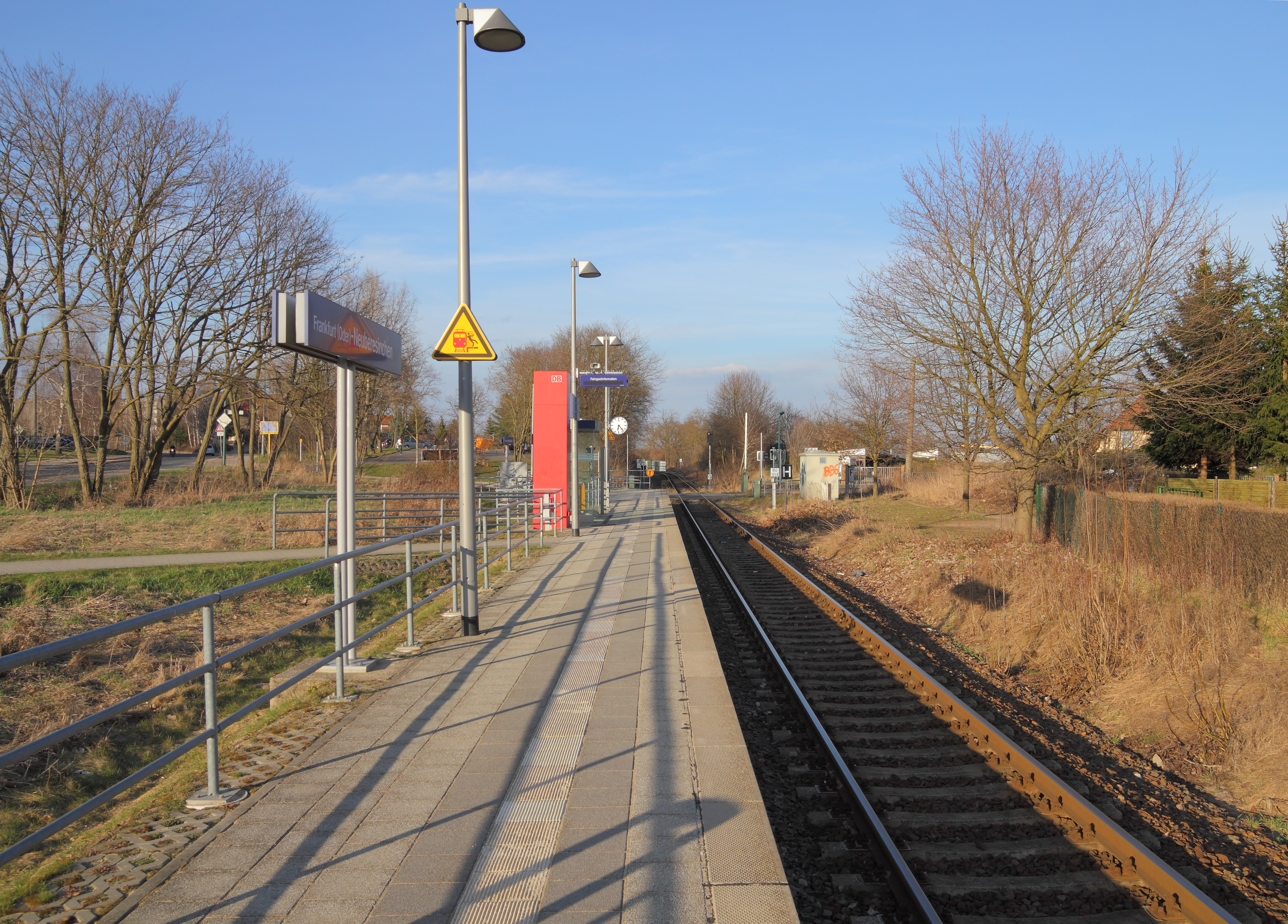
- 2013

General information
- Location: Mühlenweg; 15232 Frankfurt (Oder); Brandenburg, Germany
- Coordinates: 52.3223°N 14.5460°E
- Owner: DB Netz
- Operator: DB Station&Service
- Lines: Cottbus–Frankfurt (Oder) (KBS 209.36)
- Platforms: 1 side platform
- Tracks: 1
- Train operators: Niederbarnimer Eisenbahn

Other information
- Station code: 7748
- DS100 code: BFPN
- IBNR: 8011557
- Category: 7
- Fare zone: VBB: Frankfurt (Oder) A/5973
- Website: www.bahnhof.de

History
- Opened: December 2000; 25 years ago

Services
Preceding station	Niederbarnimer Eisenbahn	Following station
Helenesee towards Königs Wusterhausen	RB 36	Frankfurt (Oder) Terminus
Location
- Location within Brandenburg Location within Germany Location within Europe

Frankfurt (Oder)-Neuberesinchen station is a railway station in the Neuberesinchen district of the town of Frankfurt (Oder), located in Brandenburg, Germany.
