= Lübbenau–Kamenz railway =

Railway line in Germany

- Straßgräbchen-Bernsdorf station building

Overview
- Line number: 6193 (Lübbenau–Senftenberg); 6194 (Senftenberg–Kamenz)
- Locale: Brandenburg and Saxony, Germany

Service
- Route number: 209.14 (Lübbenau–Hosena)

Technical
- Line length: 70.8 km (44.0 mi)
- Track gauge: 1,435 mm (4 ft 8 1/2 in) standard gauge
- Electrification: 15 kV/16.7 Hz AC overhead catenary
- Operating speed: 100 km/h (62 mph)
Route map
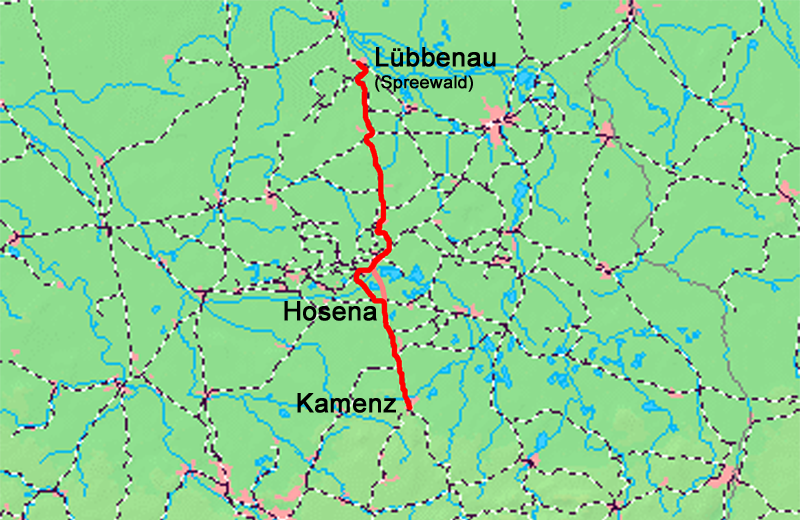
- Source: German railway atlas

The Lübbenau-Kamenz railway is a single-track main line in the German states of Brandenburg and Saxony, which was originally built and operated by the Berlin-Görlitz Railway Company (German: Berlin-Görlitzer Eisenbahn-Gesellschaft). It branches from the Berlin–Görlitz railway in Lübbenau and runs via Calau and Senftenberg to Kamenz in Saxony. It connects there with the Kamenz–Pirna railway.

== History ==
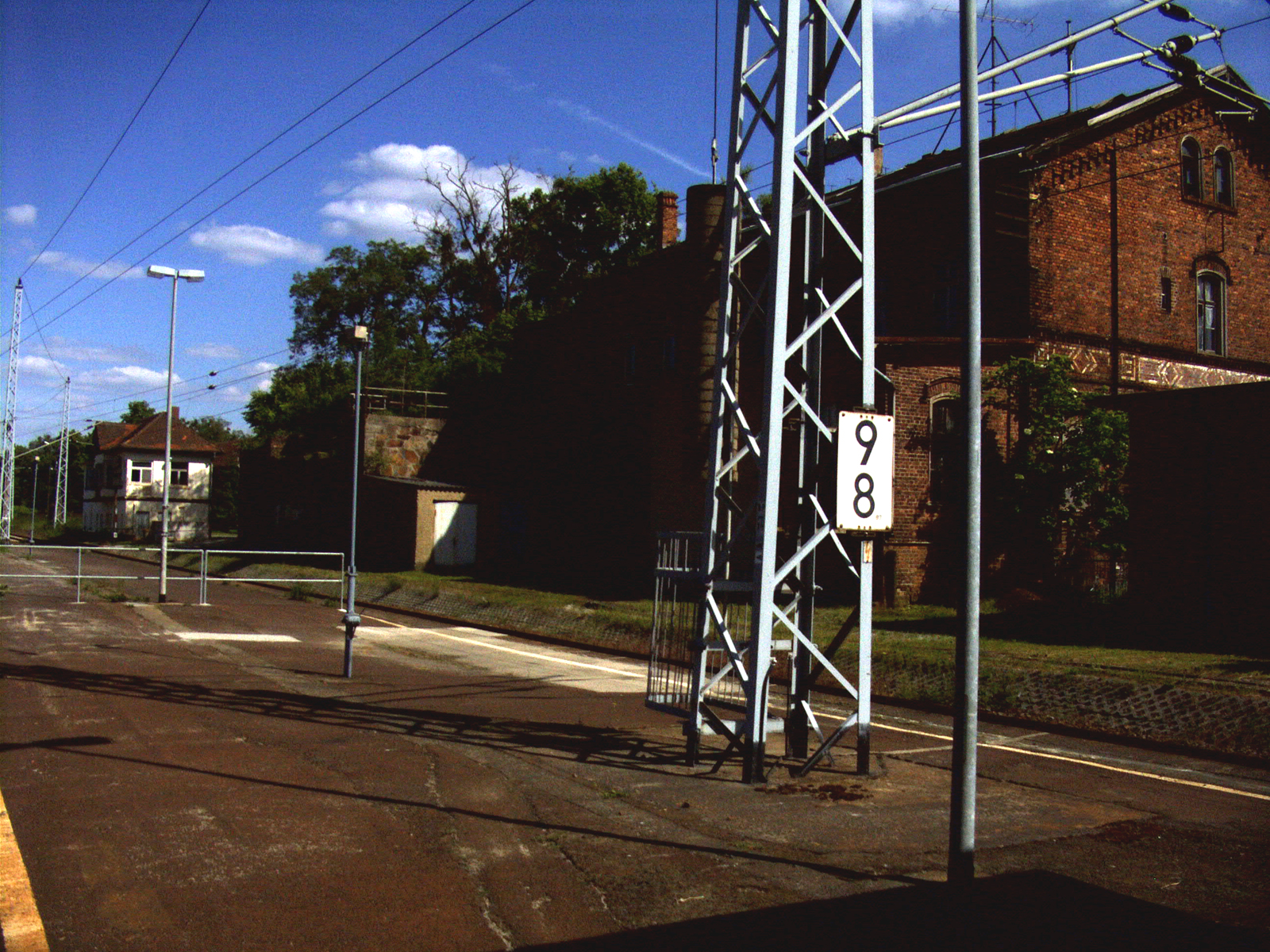
The original route is still visible in Hosena

Wiednitz station is not in use for regular passenger traffic any more

The line from Lübbenau via Großräschen, Senftenberg to Kamenz was opened in 1874. In 1882, the Berlin-Görlitz railway company was nationalised and became part of the Prussian state railways. During the time of East Germany, the Lübbenau–Senftenberg section had great significance for the local lignite industry, including the nearby opencast mines.

On 23 May 1998, the passenger traffic on the Hosena–Kamenz section was abandoned by the Verkehrsverbund Oberelbe (Oberelbe Transport Association). Freight traffic continues to run.
