= Senftenberg station =

Railway station in Senftenberg, Germany

Senftenberg
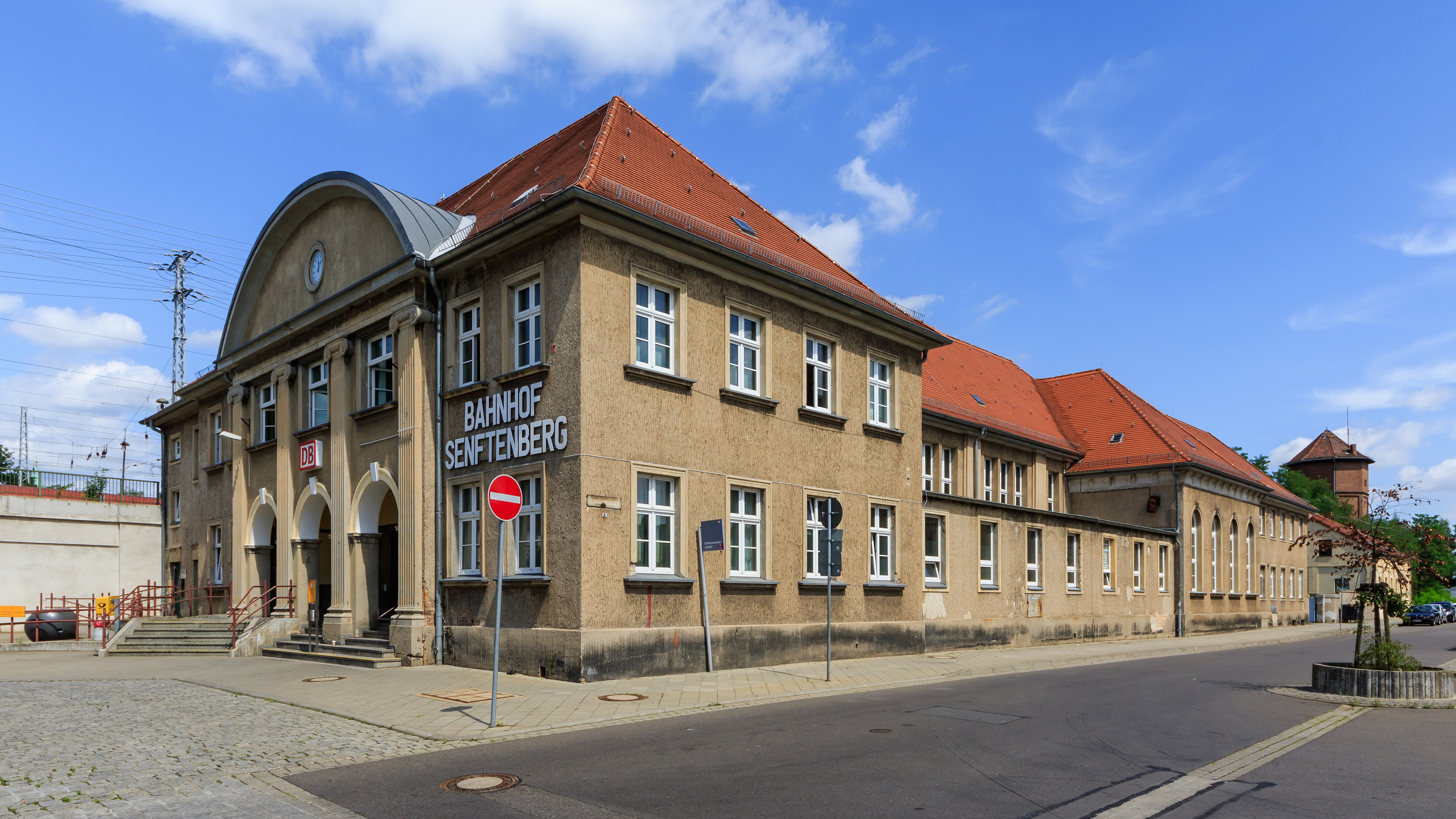
- Station building seen from the west

General information
- Location: Senftenberg, Brandenburg; Germany
- Coordinates: 51°31′36″N 14°0′13″E
- Owner: Deutsche Bahn
- Operator: DB Station&Service
- Lines: Lübbenau–Kamenz (Sachs) (KBS 209.14); Großenhain–Cottbus (KBS 208); Schipkau–Senftenberg (closed)
- Platforms: 4
- Connections: 599 613 617 618 620 621 622 641 642 643

Construction
- Accessible: Yes

Other information
- Station code: 5823
- DS100 code: BSN
- IBNR: 8010327
- Category: 5
- Fare zone: VBB: 7765
- Website: www.bahnhof.de

History
- Opened: 1869

Passengers
- < 2,500

Services
Preceding station	DB Regio Nordost	Following station
Terminus	RE 7	Sedlitz Ost towards Dessau Hbf
Ruhland towards Elsterwerda	RE 13	Sedlitz Ost towards Cottbus Hbf
Ruhland towards Dresden Hbf	RE 18	Sedlitz Ost towards Cottbus Hbf
Schwarzheide Ost towards Falkenberg (Elster)	RB 49	Sedlitz Ost towards Cottbus Hbf
Location
- Location within Brandenburg Location within Germany Location within Europe

Senftenberg station is a railway station in Senftenberg in the German state of Brandenburg. It is a through station at the railway junction of the Lübbenau-Kamenz and the Großenhain–Cottbus railways, as well as the closed Schipkau–Senftenberg railway. It is classified by Deutsche Bahn as a category 5 station.

== History ==
The first station building was built in 1869 along with the line from Cottbus via Senftenberg and Großenhain to Dresden. In 1874, a second line, the Lübbenau–Kamenz railway was opened by the Berlin-Görlitz Railway Company. A second station building was built at that time.

As a result of extensions to handle the transport of lignite from the nearby lignite mining areas and the duplication of the line, the station building was rebuilt several times and expanded, most recently in 1927 during the raising of the tracks. The first tracks at Senftenberg were electrified in November 1987; all tracks exiting from Senftenberg have been operated electrically since 1990. The entrance building and the bus station in front of it were renovated and expanded after 1990.

After that the station lost its services one by one. Ticketing and services were closed or replaced by machines. The last shop was a hairdresser.

The entrance building still has a mural representing the town of Senftenberg. It is based on a view of the town in the 1970s.

== Transport ==
In the 2026 timetable the following lines stop at the station:

Line	Route	Frequency (min)
RE 7	Senftenberg – Lübben (Spreewald) – Königs Wusterhausen – Berlin Hauptbahnhof – Bad Belzig – Dessau	Hourly
RE 13	Cottbus – Senftenberg – Ruhland – Elsterwerda-Biehla – Elsterwerda (Mon–Fri only)	Hourly (Cottbus–Senftenberg); Every two hours (Senftenberg–Elsterwerda)
RE 18	Cottbus – Senftenberg – Ruhland – Großenhain – Priestewitz – Dresden	Every 2 hours
RB 49	Cottbus – Senftenberg – Ruhland – Elsterwerda-Biehla – Falkenberg (Elster)	Every 2 hours
