= Eisenhüttenstadt station =

Railway station in Germany

Eisenhüttenstadt
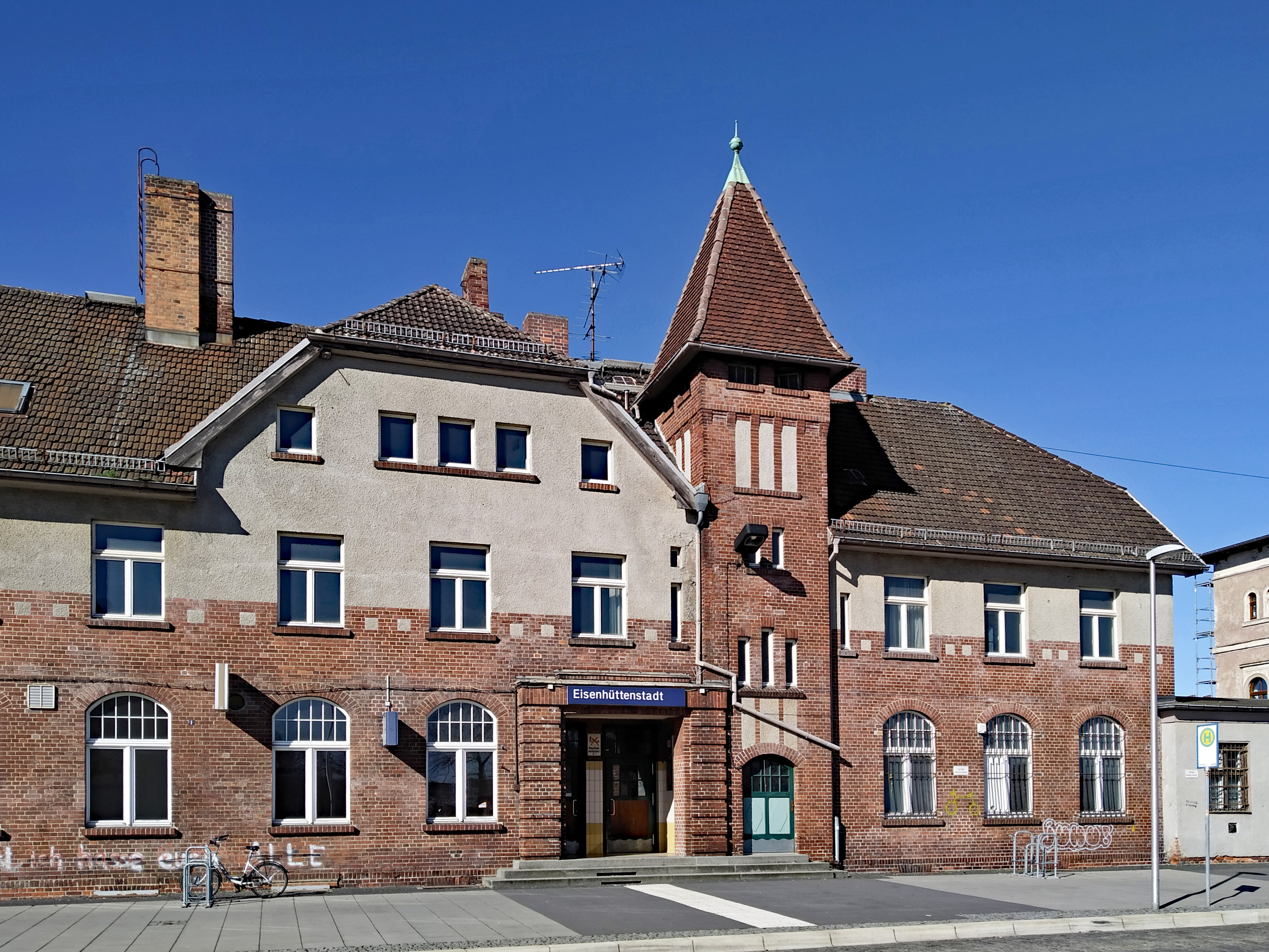
- 2020

General information
- Location: Eisenbahnstraße 21; 15890 Eisenhüttenstadt; Brandenburg; Germany
- Coordinates: 52°08′53″N 14°39′30″E
- Owner: Deutsche Bahn
- Operator: DB Netz; DB Station&Service
- Lines: Berlin–Wrocław railway (KBS 211)
- Platforms: 1 island platform
- Tracks: 2
- Train operators: DB Regio Nordost; Ostdeutsche Eisenbahn

Other information
- Station code: 1536
- DS100 code: BEHS
- IBNR: 8011471
- Category: 5
- Fare zone: VBB: 6375
- Website: www.bahnhof.de

History
- Opened: before 1855

Services
Preceding station	Ostdeutsche Eisenbahn	Following station
Guben towards Cottbus Hbf	RE 1	Frankfurt (Oder) towards Magdeburg Hbf
Preceding station	DB Regio Nordost	Following station
Neuzelle towards Leipzig Hbf	RE 10	Ziltendorf towards Frankfurt (Oder)
Neuzelle towards Herzberg (Elster)	RB 43	Ziltendorf towards Frankfurt (Oder)
Location

Eisenhüttenstadt station is a railway station in the town of Eisenhüttenstadt, located in the Oder-Spree district in Brandenburg, Germany.
