= Zeithain–Elsterwerda railway =

Railway line in Germany

Overview
- Line number: 6273
- Locale: Brandenburg and Saxony, Germany
- Termini: Zeithain Bogendreieck junction; Elsterwerda

Service
- Route number: 520

Technical
- Line length: 20.05 km (12.46 mi)
- Track gauge: 1,435 mm (4 ft 8 1/2 in) standard gauge
- Minimum radius: 1000 m
- Electrification: 15 kV/16.7 Hz AC overhead catenary
- Operating speed: 120 km/h (74.6 mph) (maximum)
- Maximum incline: 0.3%

The Zeithain–Elsterwerda railway, also known as the Riesa–Elsterwerda railway, is a two-track, electrified main line in the German states of Saxony and Brandenburg, which was originally built and operated by the Leipzig–Dresden Railway Company (Leipzig-Dresdner Eisenbahn-Compagnie). It runs from Riesa via Bogendreieck Zeithain to Elsterwerda on the Berlin–Dresden railway. The line is part of the long-distance line between Chemnitz and Berlin.

== History ==
Since 1872, a connection from Riesa to Elsterwerda had been considered useful by various private railway companies, such as the Berlin-Dresden Railway.

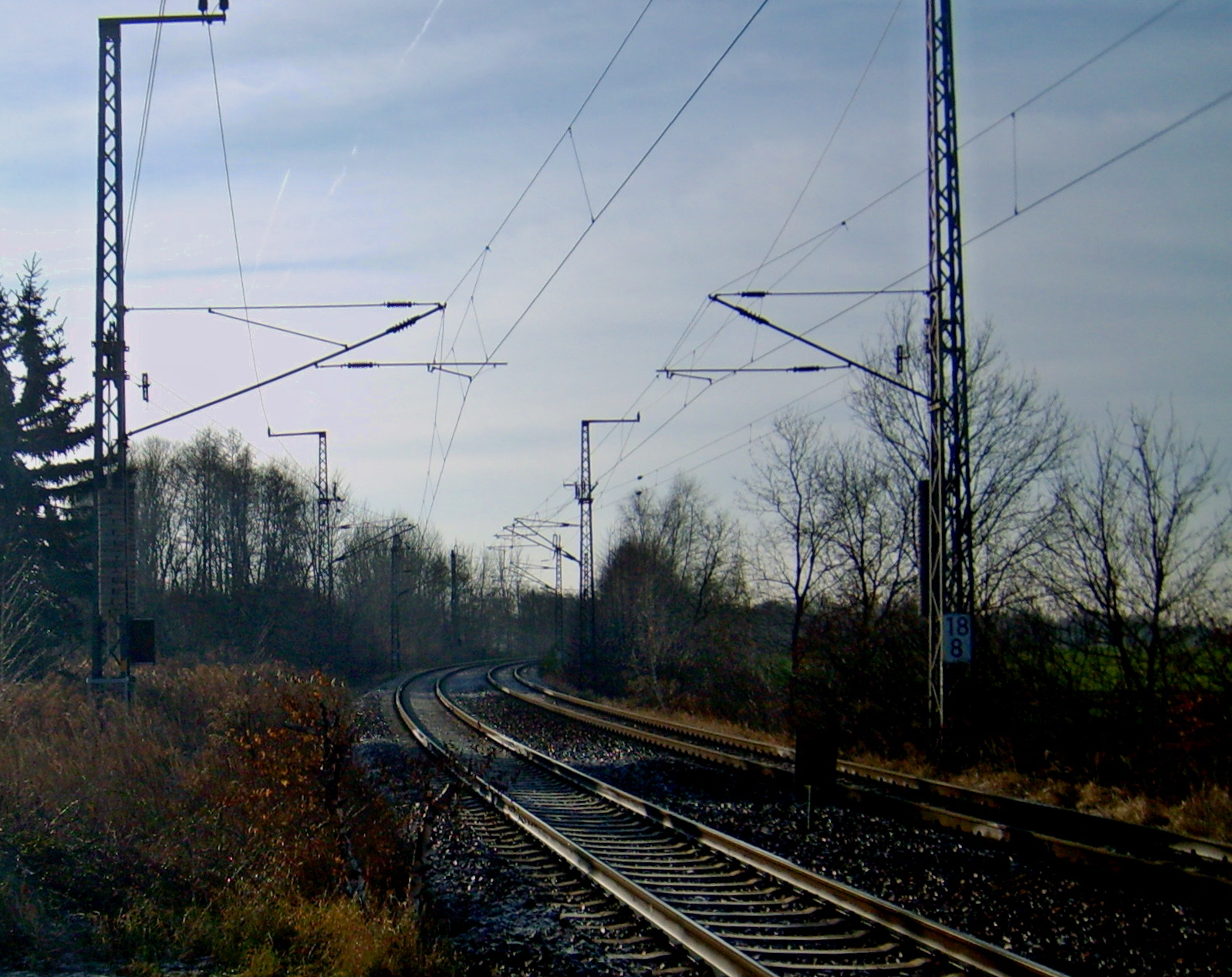
The Riesa–Elsterwerda railway near Kotschka

The Leipzig-Dresden Railway was particularly interested in extending its route network to the north. It was considered that a projected connection from Moldova (German: Moldau) via Freiberg and Nossen to Riesa would create an attractive route for the transport of Bohemian coal to Prussia.

The project was authorised by a treaty between Prussia and Saxony on 26 August 1874. Construction of the line began on a relatively easy route on 15 March 1875. It was opened on 15 October 1875.

The Leipzig–Dresden Railway was nationalised on 1 January 1876. The line was then incorporated into the network of the Royal Saxon State Railways. This line was subsequently operated as double-track secondary line.

After the Second World War, the second track as dismantled for reparations to the Soviet Union.

During the time of East Germany, rail traffic shifted to run mainly north–south. Of particular importance was the connection between Karl-Marx-Stadt and Berlin. As a result, the line was doubled again and it was electrified in the mid-1980s. Electric operations started on 13 December 1986. A day later—on 14 December 1986—the route was declared to be a main line. Long-distance services between Chemnitz and Berlin ran over the line until 2006, when the IR 34 service was abandoned; it then ran for a few kilometres over the Leipzig–Dresden railway and continued from Riesa over the Riesa–Chemnitz railway.

== Route ==
The line running from south to north runs from the Leipzig-Dresden railway immediately after the beginning of the line to Jüterbog to the northeast and passes under federal highways 98 and 169. Then it runs straight to the Zeithainer Rohrwerk (Zeithain pipe factory) factory stop, the former storage areas of the rail track construction organisation of Deutsche Reichsbahn in Wülknitz and a further 900 metres to the baroque manor house and the castle chapel in Tiefenau over before crossing the Große Röder while running next to federal highway 169. From Gröditz, it runs jointly with the parallel Elsterwerda-Grödel barge canal through the conservation area of Röderaue before it meets the line from Dresden near Kotschka. The two lines run parallel across the Pulsnitz and the Black Elster rivers before it reaches Elsterwerda station.
