= Cottbus–Frankfurt (Oder) railway =

Rail line in Brandenburg, Germany

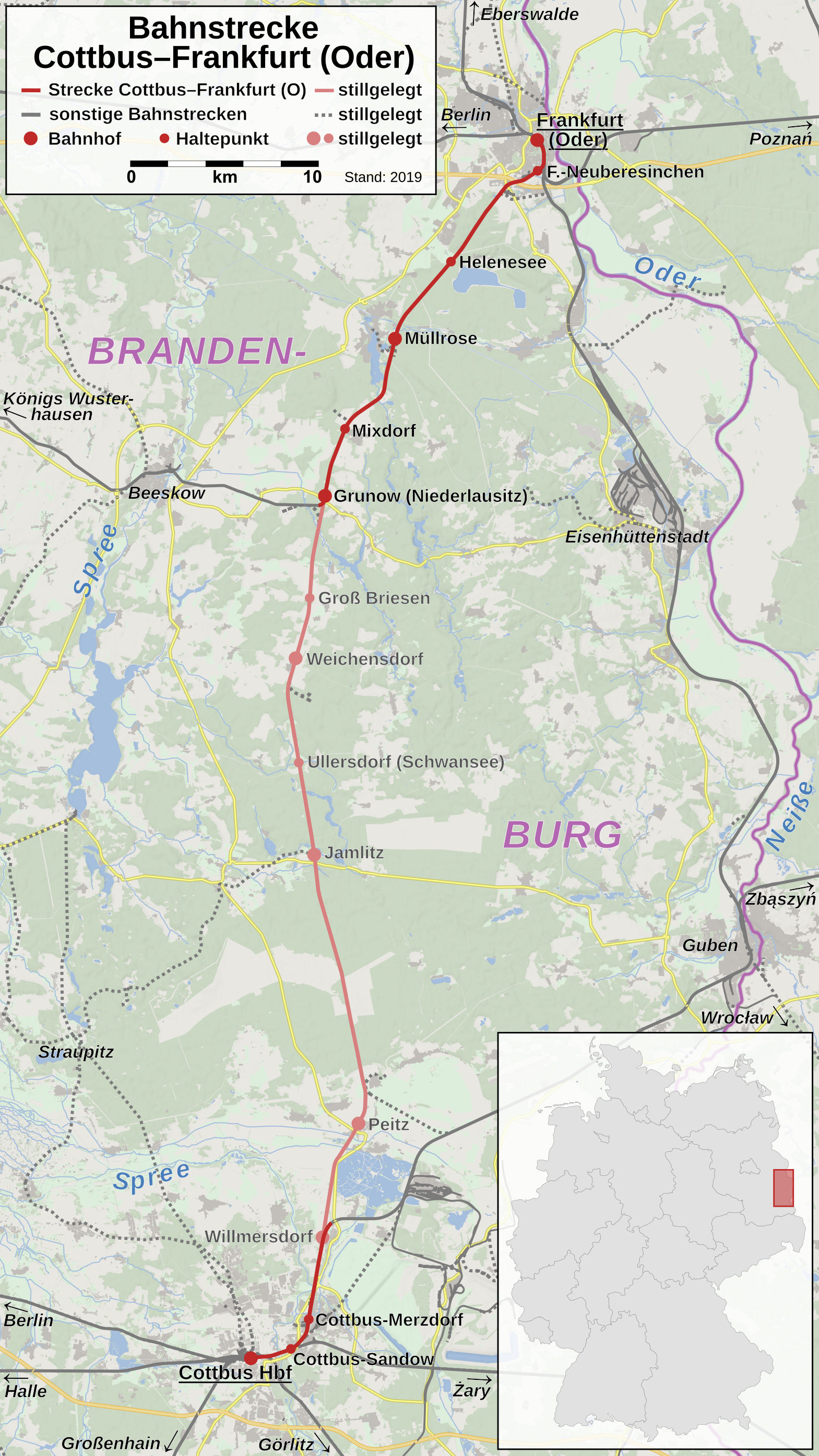

Overview
- Line number: 6253 (Germany)
- Locale: Brandenburg, Germany

Service
- Route number: 209.36 (Frankfurt–Grunow); 211 (Willmersdorf–Cottbus)

Technical
- Line length: 73.2 km (45.5 mi)
- Track gauge: 1,435 mm (4 ft 8 1/2 in) standard gauge
- Electrification: 15 kV/16.7 Hz AC Overhead catenary

The Cottbus–Frankfurt (Oder) railway is a single-track main line in the German state of Brandenburg, which was originally built and operated by the Cottbus-Großenhain Railway Company (German: Cottbus-Großenhainer Eisenbahn-Gesellschaft, CGE) and directly connects the two cities to each other. It runs from Cottbus via Peitz to Frankfurt (Oder). Only the section between Grunow and Frankfurt and a short section near Cottbus are still in operation. Trains running over the line now use the line to Guben and continue on the line of the former Lower Silesian-Mark Railway (Niederschlesisch-Märkische Eisenbahn).

== History ==
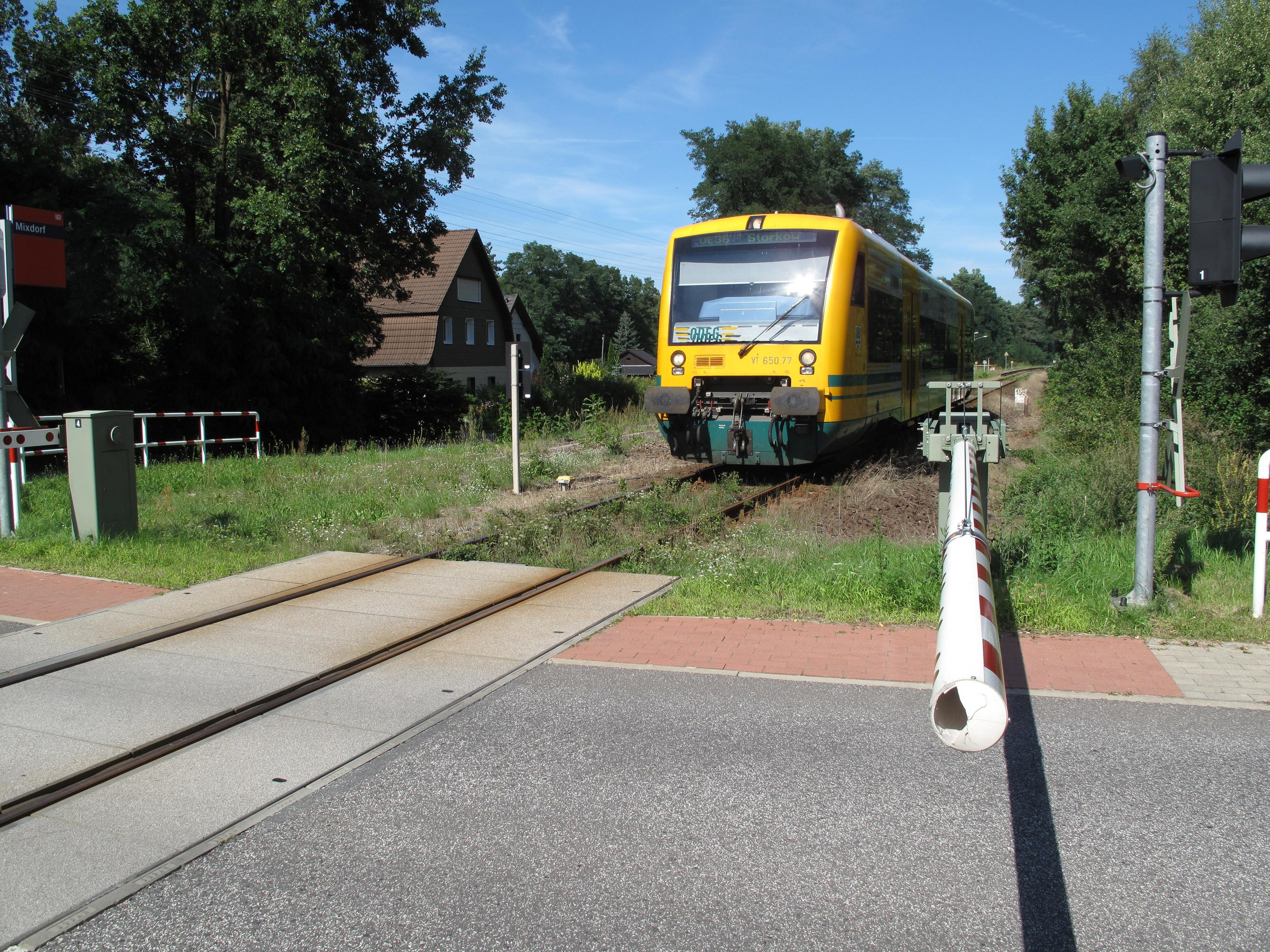
Regio-Shuttle of the ODEG near the entrance to Mixdorf station

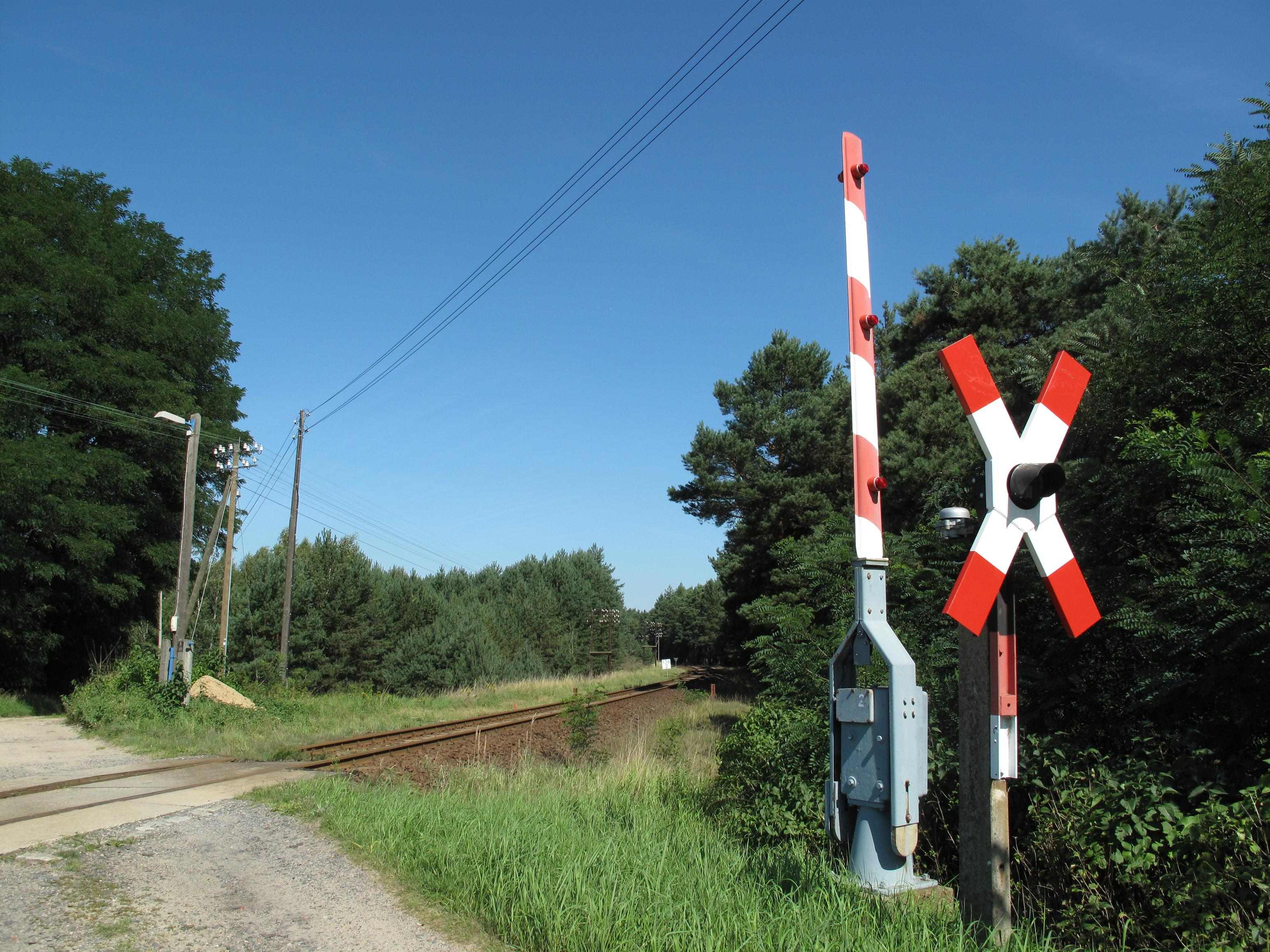
Level crossing of the road to Großer Müllroser See

Planning for a rail connection from the area around the town of Müllrose had started by 1840. In 1843, August Leopold Crelle presented a design for a railway from Berlin to Breslau (now Wrocław) that would run near Briesen. This connection—the Lower Silesian-Mark Railway—was, however, built via Frankfurt (Oder). Subsequently plans were studied for a line between Frankfurt and Leipzig. The Cottbus-Großenhain Railway Company opened a line between Großenhain and Cottbus in 1870 and planned an extension to Frankfurt. The original plans envisaged a course via Friedland and Beeskow, but it was eventually decided to take a route further east.

The line was opened to traffic on 31 December 1876. Stations were built in between in Peitz, Jamlitz (first called Lieberose after a nearby town), Weichensdorf, Grunow and Müllrose. The railway served at first as a long-distance connection between Dresden, Cottbus and Frankfurt (Oder) and with other towns located to the east of the Oder.

In 1871 and 1872 the Halle-Sorau-Guben Railway Company built lines from Leipzig and Halle to Cottbus with connections to Guben and to Sorau (now Żary). This also connected with the line from Berlin to Wroclaw and Frankfurt (Oder). Semi-fast and express trains ran between Cottbus and Frankfurt on this line until 1945, but they were then diverted on the slightly longer and better maintained route through Guben and Eisenhüttenstadt in order to serve these two important towns. Some passenger services remained on the line via Grunow.

The line remained single-track and non-electrified. Due to the lack of traffic on the line, Deutsche Bahn closed passenger services between Grunow and Peitz on 1 June 1996. For some years railcars still ran hourly between Cottbus and Peitz until this traffic was abandoned on 30 May 2000. Freight traffic ended between Grunow and Jamlitz on 1 July 1996 and between Peitz and Jamlitz on 5 November 2000. In August 2002, the section between Cottbus and Willmersdorf was reactivated since in this area the Cottbus–Guben railway had to be moved for the expansion of the Cottbus-Nord open cast mine. The line was relaid next to the old line towards Peitz as far as Willmersdorf. This also included the construction of several stations.

== Rail services ==
Services are operated by Niederbarnimer Eisenbahn GmbH (NEB) on the Königs Wusterhausen–Beeskow-Frankfurt (Oder) route as the RB 36 Regionalbahn service. These services run hourly on weekdays and every two hours on the weekend.
