= Großenhain–Cottbus railway =

Railway line

Großenhain–Cottbus
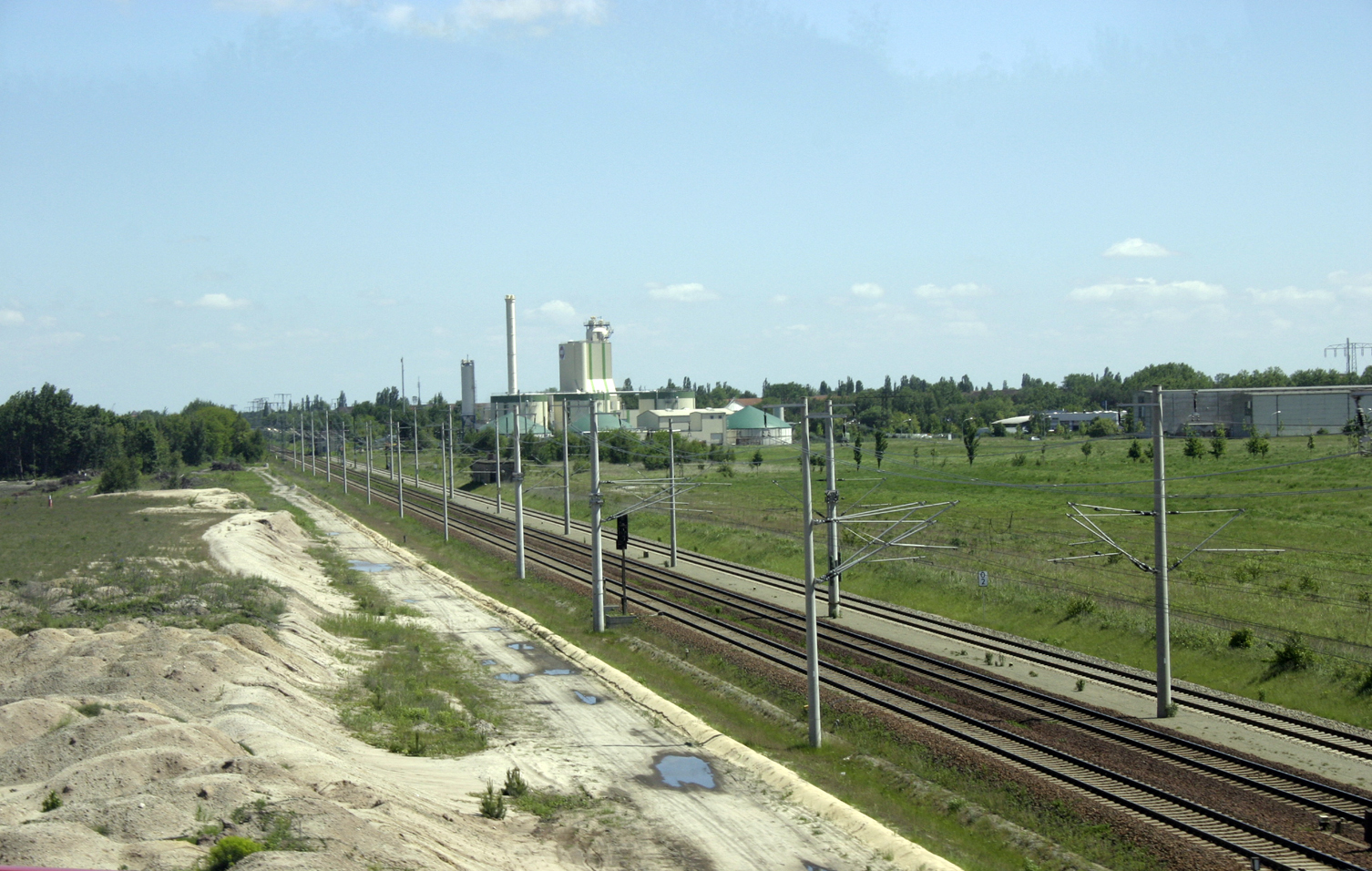
- The line south of Senftenberg

Overview
- Line number: 6253
- Locale: Saxony and Brandenburg, Germany

Service
- Route number: 208

Technical
- Line length: 79.7 km (49.5 mi)
- Number of tracks: 2 (Ruhland–Cottbus)
- Track gauge: 1,435 mm (4 ft 8 1/2 in) standard gauge
- Electrification: 15 kV/16.7 Hz AC; Overhead catenary
Route map
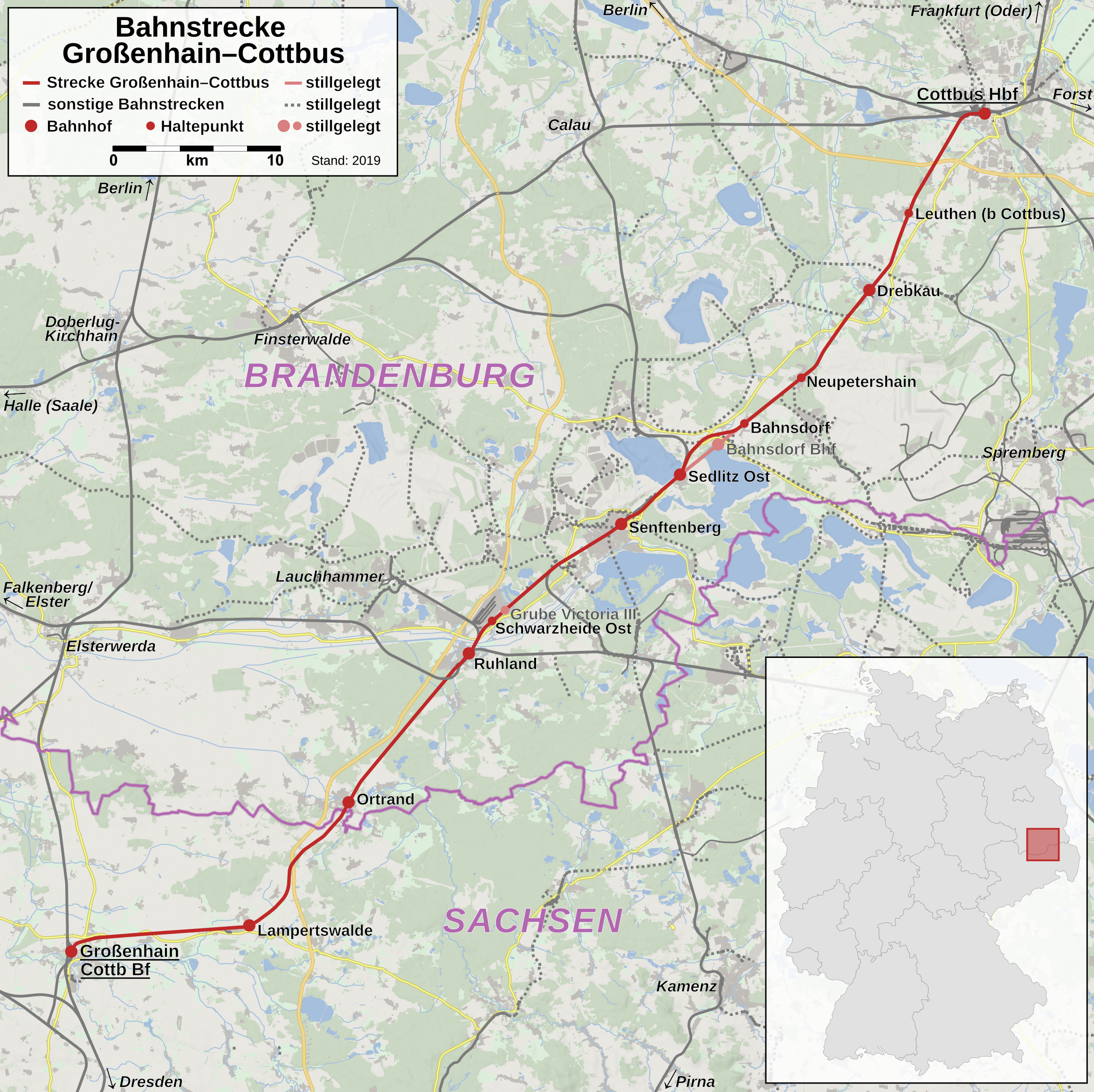
- Source: German railway atlas

The Großenhain–Cottbus railway is an electrified main railway in the German states of Saxony and Brandenburg. It is double track between Cottbus and Ruhland and elsewhere single-track. It runs from Großenhain via Ruhland and Senftenberg to Cottbus.

== History ==
The Großenhain–Cottbus line was built by the Cottbus-Großenhain Railway Company (German: Cottbus-Großenhainer Eisenbahn-Gesellschaft).

The Großenhain–Cottbus line was opened on 20 April 1870. With the subsequent opening of the Berlin–Dresden railway, Großenhain had two railway stations. The existing station on the line to Cottbus was renamed Großenhain Cottbuser Bahnhof and the new station was named Großenhain Berliner Bahnhof.

The end of the runway of the Großenhain military airfield used to be shortly east of Großenhain station towards Lampertswalde. Therefore, in the period between the electrification of the line in 1992 and the withdrawal of the Soviet/Russian armed forces in the autumn of 1993, a 660 metre long section was not electrified (route km 3.76 to 4.42). Electric locomotives coasted on this section of track with pantographs lowered. In addition, at the beginning of this section of the line from either direction progress was controlled from a signal, operated not by the railway dispatcher, but from the airfield. Thus, trains could be brought to a stop for the takeoff or landing of an aircraft without an earlier warning of a stop, leading to trains stopping in the catenary-free section and requiring them to be towed by a diesel locomotive based in the station.

Today the line is the main line between Dresden and Cottbus. The line is served by Regional-Express services on the Dresden–Cottbus, Dresden–Hoyerswerda and Cottbus–Falkenberg/Elster routes.
