= Berlin–Wrocław railway =

Railway line in Germany and Poland

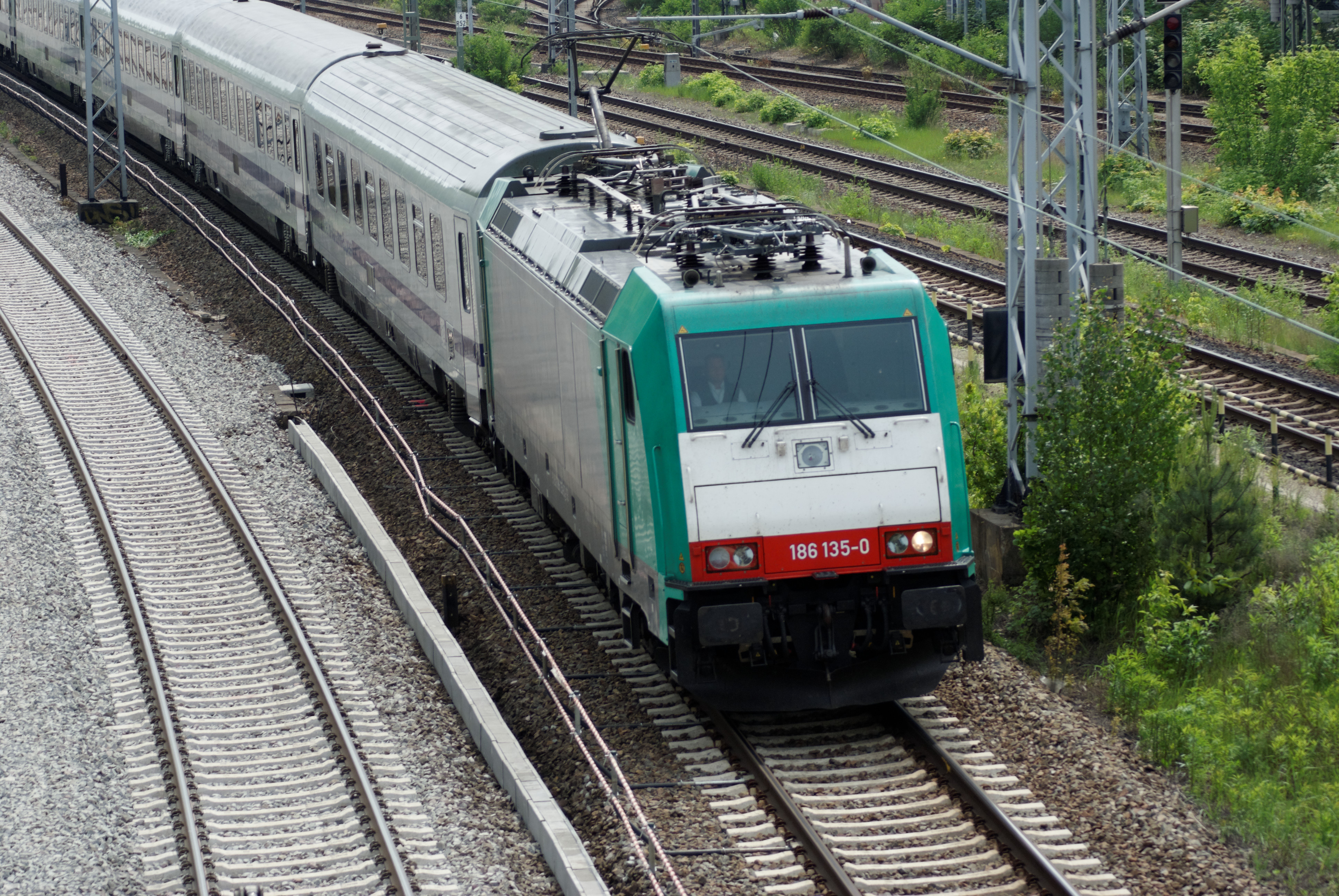
- The Berlin-Warsaw Express in 2010

Overview
- Native name: Niederschlesisch-Märkische Eisenbahn
- Line number: Berlin–Guben: 6153; Gubinek–Wrocław Muchobór 275; Wrocław Muchobór–Wrocław Główny 273
- Locale: Berlin, Brandenburg, Lower Silesian Voivodeship
- Termini: Berlin Ostbahnhof; Guben

Service
- Route number: Berlin–Eisenhüttenstadt: DB 201; Frankfurt (Oder)–Guben: DB 211; Żagań–Legnica: PKP 270; Legnica-Wrocław: PKP 260

Technical
- Line length: 329.5 km (204.7 mi)
- Track gauge: 1,435 mm (4 ft 8 1/2 in) standard gauge
- Electrification: Berlin S-Bahn: 750 V third rail; Berlin–Guben: 15 kV/16.7 Hz AC overhead; Miłkowice–Wrocław Główny: 3 kV overhead
- Operating speed: maximum speed: 160 km/h (99.4 mph)
Route map
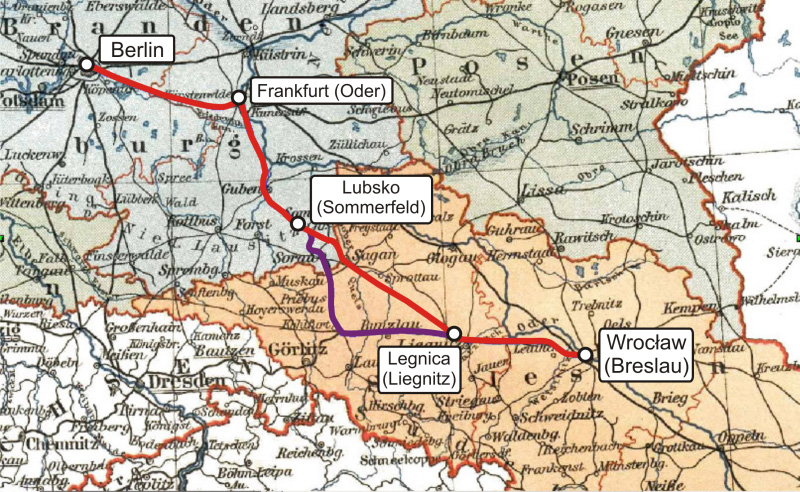
- Source: German railway atlas

The Berlin–Wrocław railway (German: Niederschlesisch-Märkische Eisenbahn-Gesellschaft, roughly translating as "Lower Silesian-Marcher Railway", NME) was a German private railway that connected Berlin (then capital of the March of Brandenburg, Mark Brandenburg) and Wrocław (in Lower Silesia, then part of Prussia, and called Breslau in German, now in Poland). It is one of the oldest lines in Germany, opened between 1842 and 1847 and acquired by the Prussian government in 1852. In 1920, it became part of the German national railways along with the rest of the Prussian state railways.

== History ==
=== Beginning ===
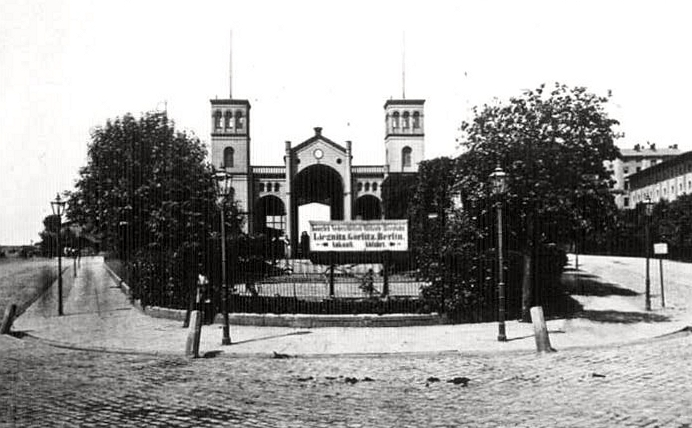
Märkischer Bahnhof in Breslau (Wrocław) in 1880

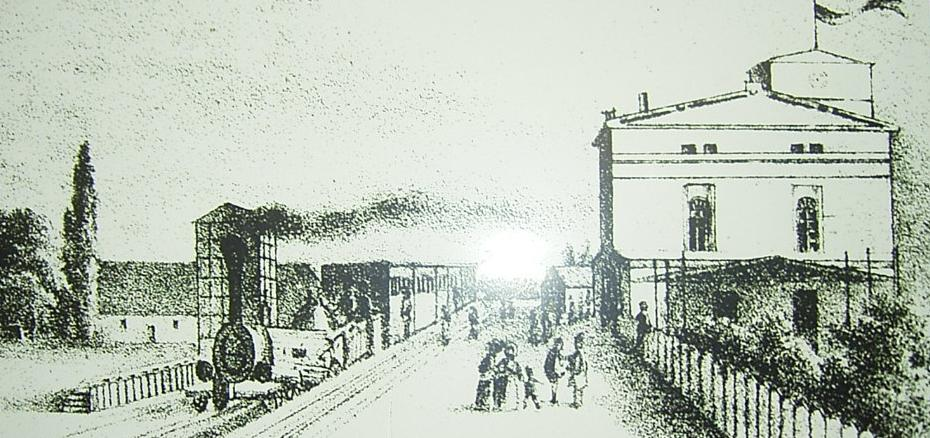
Fürstenwalde station about 1845

Around 1840 all the major countries of the German Confederation began to build main-line railways. From 1837 to 1839, the first German long-distance railway was built in Saxony, the Leipzig–Dresden railway. In 1837 Austria began building its Northern Railway. From 1838 to 1840 the first railways crossing state boundaries (the Magdeburg–Leipzig railway and the Anhalt Railway) were built. More Prussian railway projects soon followed. Thus the Berlin-Frankfurt Railway Company (Berlin-Frankfurter Eisenbahn-Gesellschaft) built an 81 kilometre-long railway between Berlin and Frankfurt (Oder) between 1840 and 1842 and opened it on 23 October 1842. It ran from the Frankfurter Bahnhof (Frankfurt station), later called the Schlesischer Bahnhof, (Silesian Station) in Berlin via Fürstenwalde to Frankfurt (Oder).

In the same year the Lower Silesian-Mark Railway Company (Niederschlesisch-Märkische Eisenbahn-Gesellschaft, NME), which was partly owned by the Prussian government, was established to build a railway from Berlin to Breslau (Wrocław), then the second largest city in Prussia, where construction of the Upper Silesian Railway (Oberschlesische Eisenbahn) had already started.

The NME completed the first section between Wrocław and Legnica (Liegnitz) on 19 October 1844 before the full route of the line had been determined. A year later, on 1 October 1845, the section to Boleslawiec (Bunzlau) was opened.

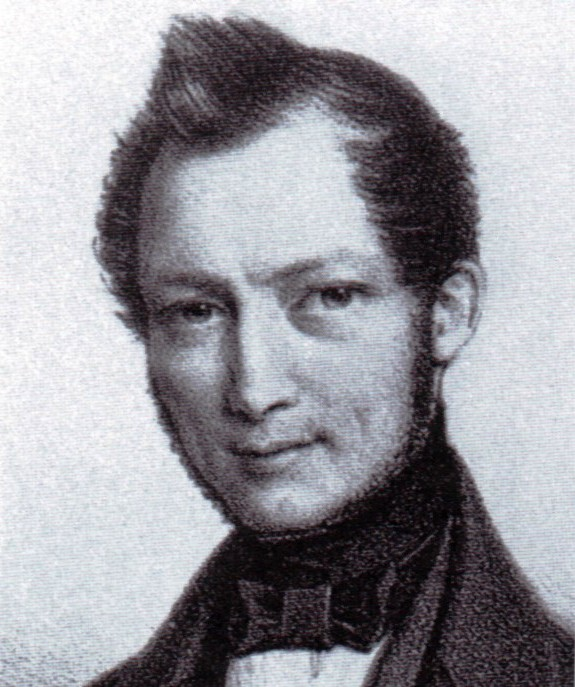
Adolph Riedel, Director of the NME from 1844 to 1849

On 1 August 1845 the Berlin-Frankfurt Railway Company's shareholders agreed to merge with the NME. The continuation of the NME's line through Węgliniec (Kohlfurt), Żary (Sorau) and Guben to Frankfurt an der Oder was completed on 1 September 1846, so that the railway extended from Wrocław to Berlin, a total distance of 357 km. The Upper Silesian Railway's network at that time already extended from Wroclaw to Racibórz (Ratibor).

On 1 September 1847 the NME's branch from Węgliniec to Görlitz and the eastern section of the Saxon-Silesian line between Reichenbach and Görlitz were both opened. This formed a continuous rail link from Wrocław via Dresden, Leipzig, Magdeburg, Oschersleben, Wolfenbüttel and Brunswick to Hanover. Six weeks later, on 15 October 1847, the opening of the Hanover–Minden line and the Hamm–Minden line created a continuous link to Deutz on the banks of the Rhine opposite Cologne, which was linked to the Western European railway network via the Rhenish Railway’s line to Aachen. With the opening of a connecting line between the Wrocław stations on 3 February 1848 it was connected to the Upper Silesian Railway (completed on 18 October 1847) and the Kraków–Upper Silesian railway (completed on 13 October 1847), creating a continuous rail link from Deutz to Kraków. Less than a year later on 1 September 1848, the William's Railway (Wilhelmsbahn) was opened from Koźle (Cosel) to Bohumín (now in the Czech Republic, then in the Austrian Empire), closing the gap between the Upper Silesian Railway and the Austrian Northern Railway, which had opened to Bohumín on 1 April 1847. This created a continuous rail link between Berlin and Vienna.

On 15 May 1875, a 93 km double-track line was opened as a shorter route between Jasień (Gassen) and Legnica (Liegnitz) via Żagań (Sagan).

=== Takeover by Prussia ===
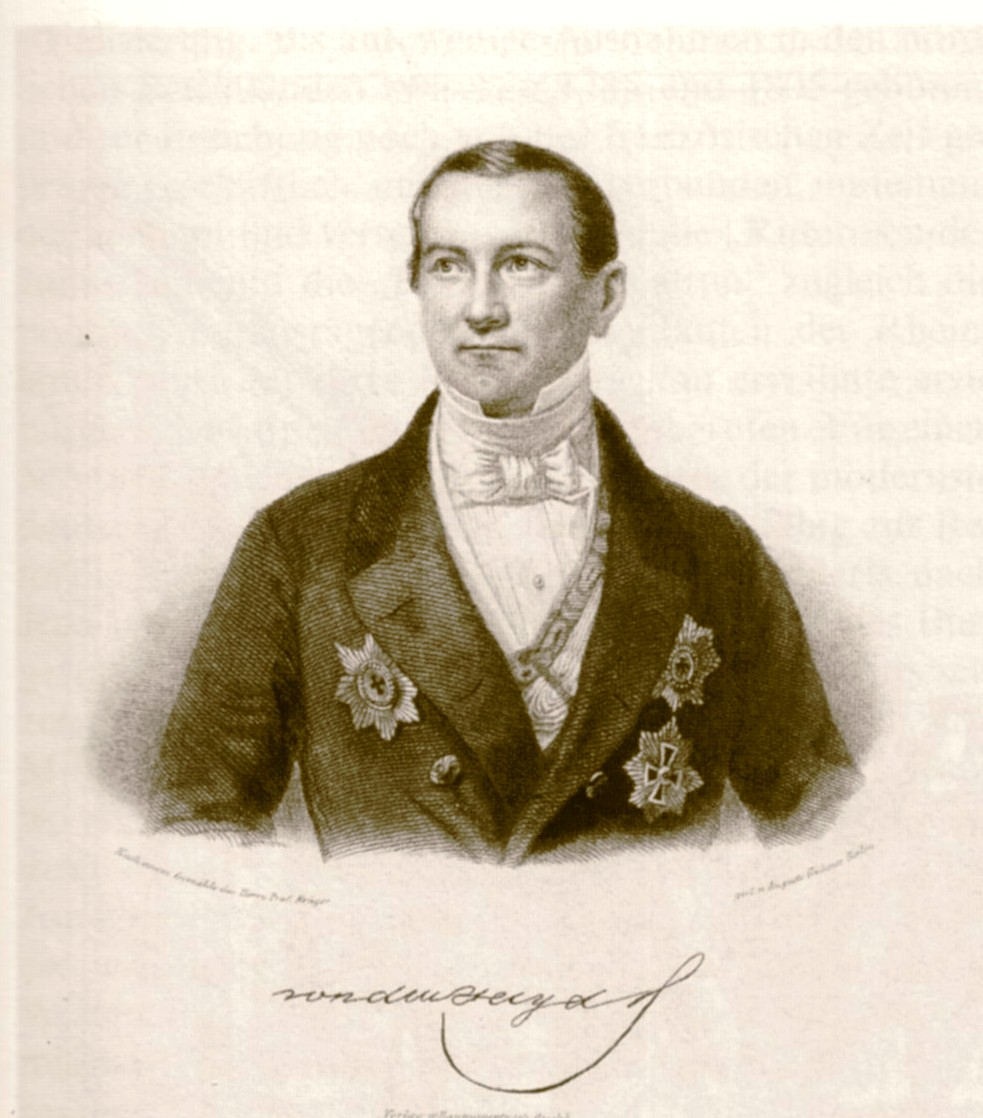
Prussian Minister of Commerce and Industry, August von der Heydt

The Prussian government had acquired shares worth 1.5 million thalers in the NME when it was established, with the right to take it over under certain circumstances. Because the railway's earnings in 1848/49 fell short of expectations, this clause came into effect and at the instigation of the Prussian Minister of Commerce and Industry, August von der Heydt on 1 January 1850 the government took over the management of the company. Although results improved quickly, 18 months later the company's directors offered to sell the railway the state.

The Minister of Commerce advocated the purchase, but there was considerable opposition from the Minister of Finance, Carl von Bodelschwingh, who pointed out the railway's significant debt. Ultimately, King Frederick William IV backed the Minister of Commerce on the grounds of the particular economic and military significance of the railway. Despite further protests the purchase was approved and completed on 1 January 1852. The NME thus became a part of the Prussian state railways and the newly created Royal Directorate of the Lower Silesian-Mark railway based in Berlin.

The beginnings of industrialisation increased traffic, especially in and around Berlin. In the period up to the 1890s many additional stations were built along the route along with the gradually laying of a second pair of tracks for suburban trains as far as Erkner.

=== Deutsche Reichsbahn and World War II ===
The Prussian railways, including the Lower Silesian-Mark railway became part of Deutsche Reichsbahn on its founding in 1920. The suburban line to Erkner was electrified in 1928 using a lateral-contact third-rail system. This and other Berlin lines were subsequently rebranded as the Berlin S-Bahn, while the long-distance services were still operated by steam.

=== After World War II ===
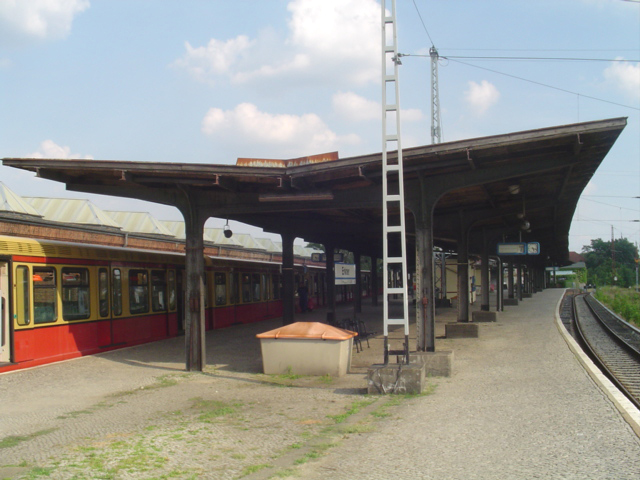
Erkner S-Bahn station in Berlin

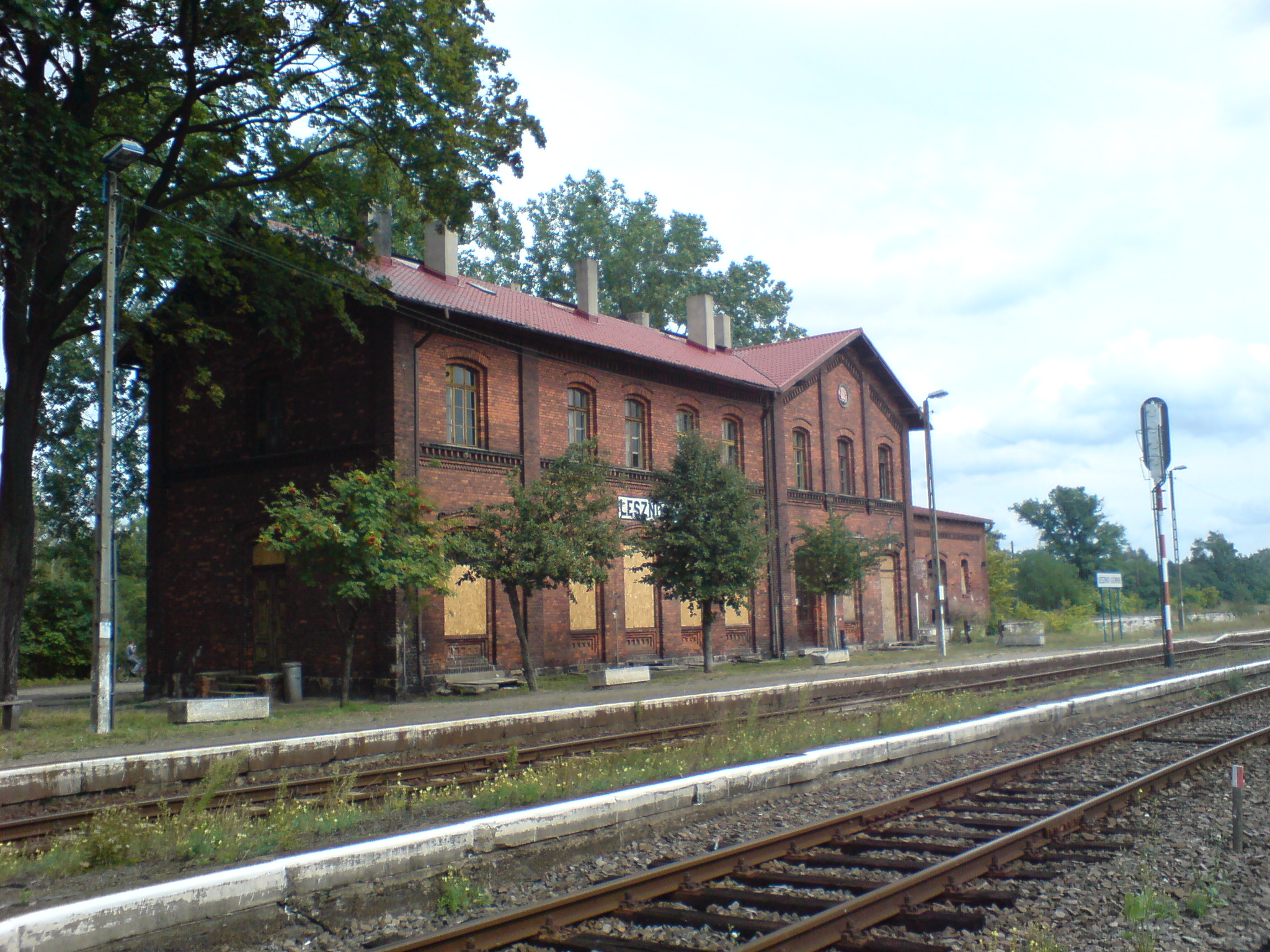
Leszno Górne station (formerly Oberleschen), now in Poland

The Frankfurt (Oder)–Poznań line, which branches off the Lower Silesian-Mark line at Frankfurt (Oder) is part of an east–west link via Warsaw to Moscow. As Soviet troops advanced this line was rebuilt with 1,520 mm (4 ft 11 27/32 in) Russian gauge for the supply of the Red Army, so that on 25 April 1945 the first Soviet military train could reach the Berlin city limits. On 28 June 1945, the first passenger train ran from Moscow to the Silesian station. In order for Joseph Stalin to travel to the Potsdam Conference a track to Potsdam was also changed to Russian broad gauge. The broad gauge tracks were returned to standard gauge by 20 September 1945 in order to increase rail capacity.

Unlike most of the lines in the Soviet zone the mainline between Berlin and Frankfurt (Oder) did not have one of its two tracks removed to provide reparations for the USSR as it was required for the transport of the reparations. In the 1980s the German Democratic Republic electrified the line to Oderbrücke station on the 15 kV 16.7 Hz AC system and the line is today a major axis of international traffic again.

The Guben–Żagań (Sagan) section of the Lower Silesian-Markish line runs over the Oder-Neisse line, the post-war boundary between Germany and Poland. Passenger services were closed and not resumed until 1972, but were then closed again in 1981 because of political developments in Poland. In 1996, Polish State Railways began operating three pairs of passenger trains between Gubinek and Guben again. Patronage was very low, so that on 6 October 2002 services were terminated. Freight traffic was mainly channelled through other routes, and the last freight train to use the route ran in 1994.

== Current situation ==
Today, Deutsche Bahn operates Regional-Express line RE1 (Magdeburg–Berlin–Frankfurt (Oder)–Eisenhüttenstadt) and RE11 (Frankfurt (Oder)–Eisenhüttenstadt–Guben–Cottbus) on the line. In Berlin section the S3 S-Bahn service runs parallel with the mainline.

Since 2002, the Berlin-Frankfurt (Oder) line has been upgraded for speeds of up to 160 km/h, at a cost of €167.5 million. 61.6% of these costs have been met by the European Regional Development Fund.
