= Cottbus–Guben railway =

Rail line in Brandenburg, Germany

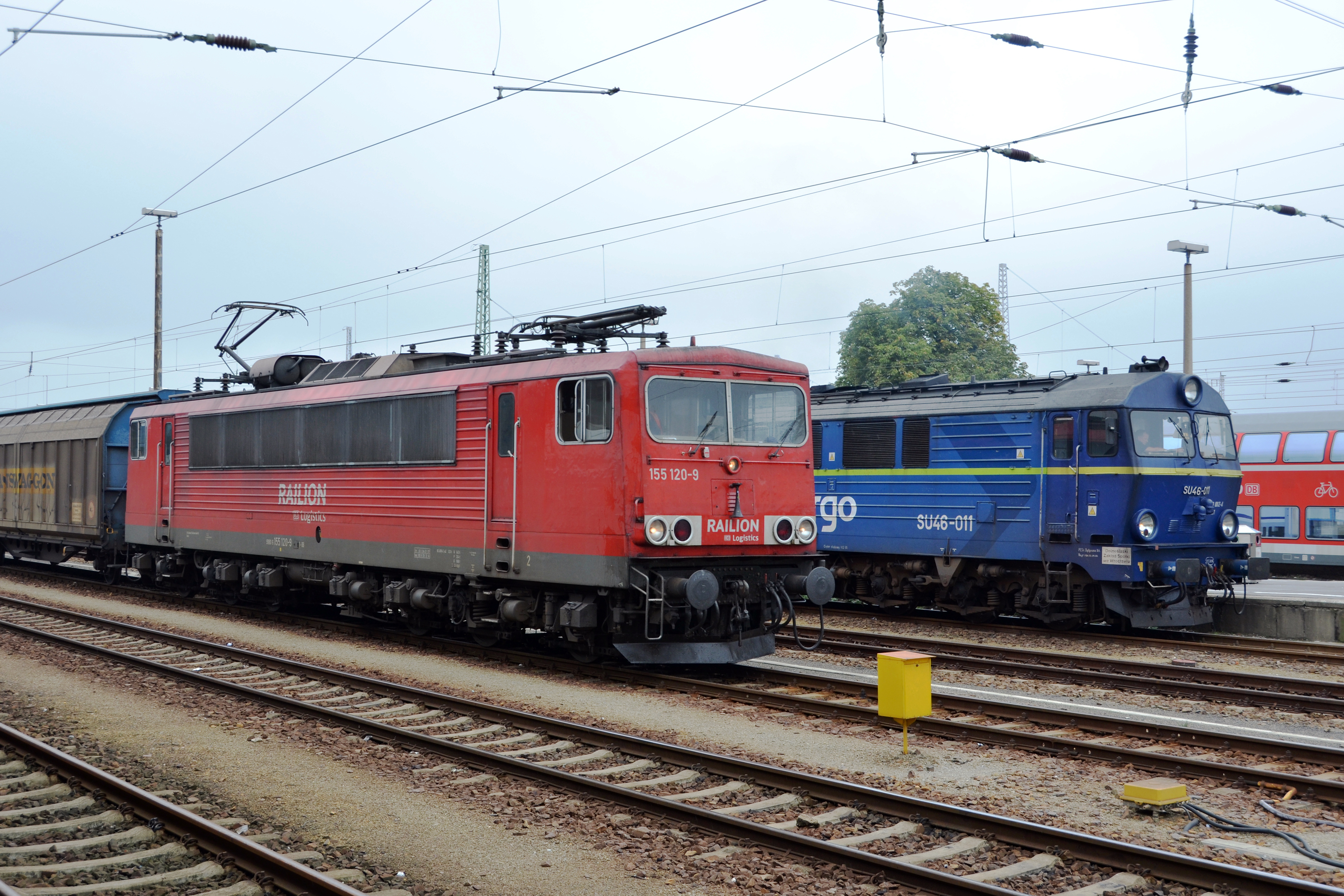
- Trains at Cottbus station in 2014

Overview
- Line number: 211
- Locale: Brandenburg

Service
- Route number: Original line: 6345; Merzdorf–Peitz Ost: 6220

Technical
- Line length: 37.7 km (23.4 mi)
- Number of tracks: 2
- Track gauge: 1,435 mm (4 ft 8 1/2 in) standard gauge
- Electrification: 15 kV/16.7 Hz AC catenary
- Operating speed: Cottbus–Peitz Ost: 140 km/h (87 mph); Peitz Ost–Guben: 120 km/h (75 mph)
Route map
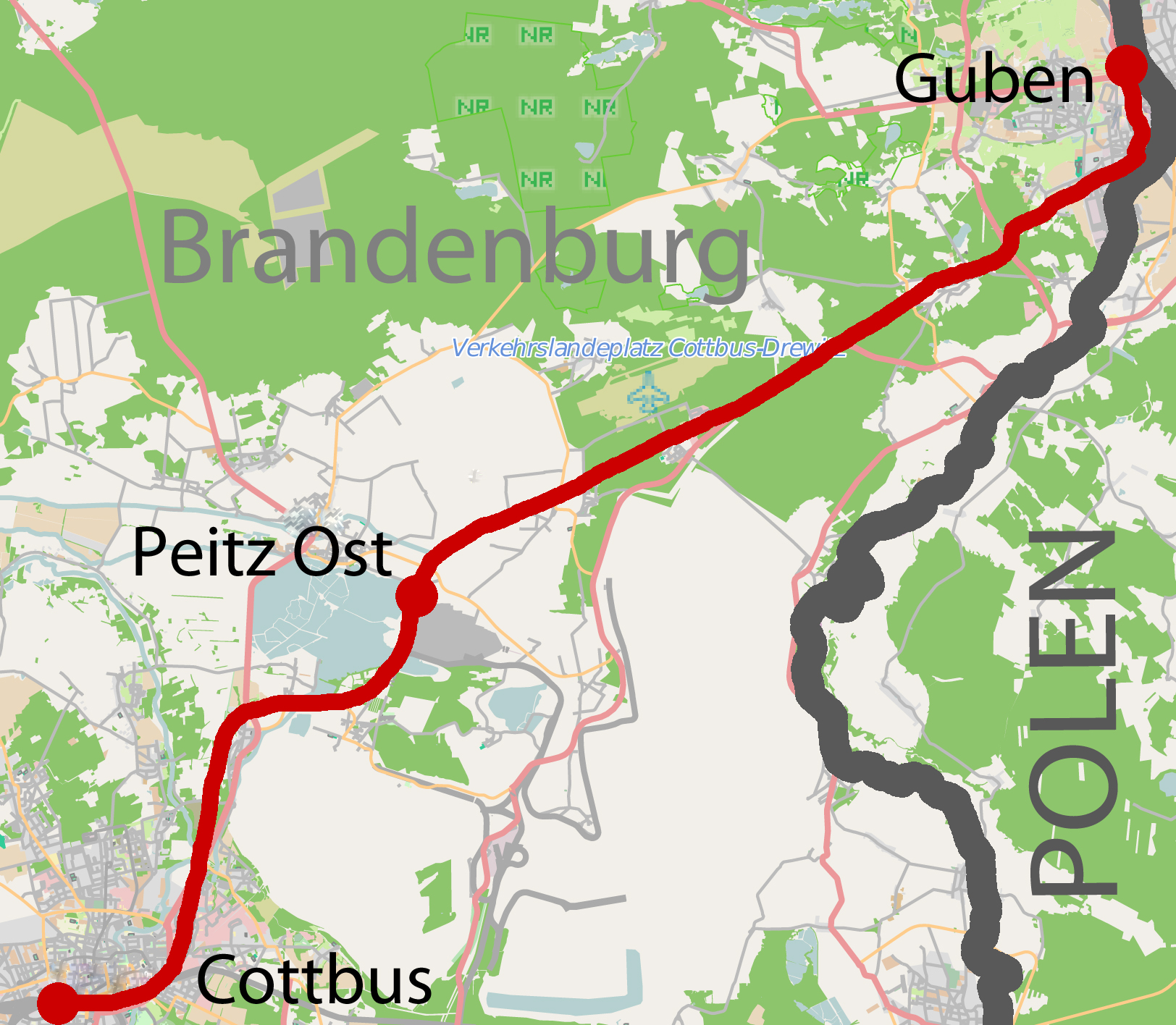
- Source: German railway atlas

The Cottbus–Guben railway is a two-track electrified main line in the Southeast of the German state of Brandenburg. It connects the city of Cottbus with the town of Guben, which is on the German–Polish border and the Lusatian Neisse. The line is served every hour by Regional-Express service RE 11, which connects Cottbus, Guben and continues towards Eisenhüttenstadt and Frankfurt (Oder). Starting in 2002, parts of the line were rerouted in the Cottbus area to allow the expansion of the Cottbus-Nord lignite mine.

== History ==
The line was the first part of the network of the Halle-Sorau-Guben Railway Company (German: Halle-Sorau-Gubener Eisenbahn-Gesellschaft, HSGE), which was opened to traffic on 1 September 1871. With the railway between Guben and Bentschen (now Zbąszynek), which had been completed one year earlier, it was part of a direct connection between Poznań and Cottbus. With the expansion of the HSGE network to the west, a direct rail line was also completed to Halle (Saale) and Leipzig. Since the railway together with the adjacent lines, created the first southern bypass of the Berlin railway node, the tracks were doubled before the end of the 19th century. In addition to the local services between Cottbus, Guben and Bentschen, expresses ran between Frankfurt (Main) and Eydtkuhnen (now Chernyshevskoye) then on the border between Germany and Russia (now on the border between Russia and Lithuania). Later pair long-distance express services operated between Leipzig and Königsberg (now Kaliningrad in Russia) and between Halle and Allenstein (now Olsztyn).

After 1945, the Oder–Neisse line was established as the eastern border of Germany and interrupted rail traffic at Guben. However, the line obtained new significance for both passengers and freight with the construction of new industrial areas at Guben and especially Eisenhüttenstadt. The second track, which had been dismantled after the war as war reparations to the Soviet Union, was rebuilt between 1948 and 1957.

In passenger transport, most trains between Cottbus and Guben continued to Frankfurt (Oder). In the 1980s, for example, several express trains ran between Angermünde and Dresden via Frankfurt (Oder) and an inter-zone train (a train that was not available for journeys beginning and ending in East Germany) ran between Frankfurt (Oder) and Frankfurt (Main). During the summer, a semi-fast train also ran to Stralsund.

Electrification of the whole line was completed on 15 December 1990.

On 18 September 2002, the section between Cottbus and Peitz Ost was closed because the track had to be moved to allow the expansion of the Cottbus-Nord lignite mine. Therefore, a new line was built, which passes north-west of the mine, while parts of the Cottbus–Frankfurt (Oder) railway, which had been disused since 2000 railway, were restored. The deviation was opened to traffic on 18 August 2002. At first, since only one track had been completed, a few trains ran via the old route until 7 October 2002.
