= Petershain station =

Railway station in Quitzdorf am See, Germany

Petershain Hóznica
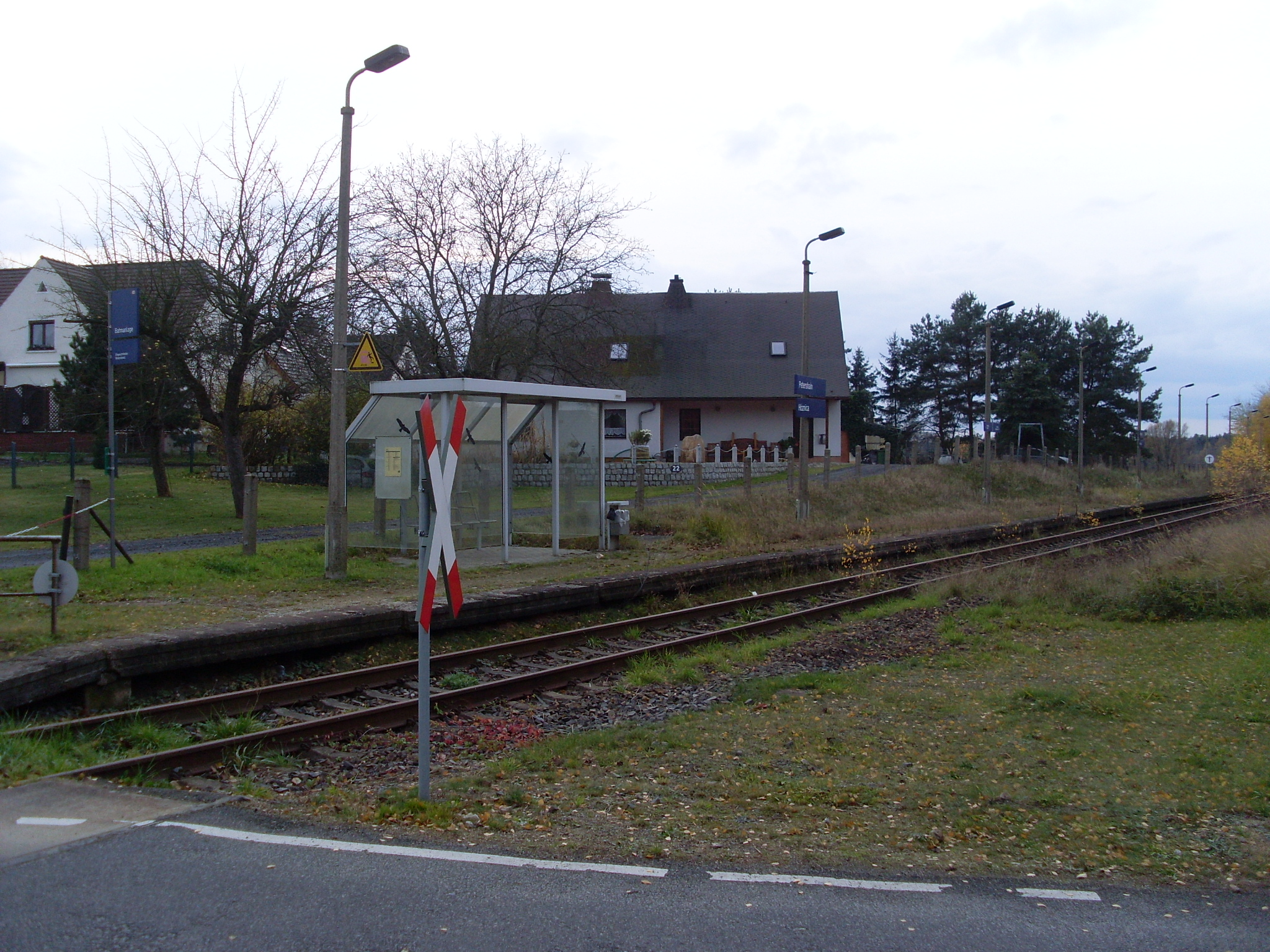
- Station in 2015, before line reconstruction started

General information
- Location: Quitzdorf am See, Saxony, Germany
- Coordinates: 51°18′59″N 14°45′09″E
- Line: Węgliniec–Roßlau railway
- Platforms: 1
- Tracks: 1

Services
Preceding station	Ostdeutsche Eisenbahn	Following station
Mücka towards Hoyerswerda	RB 64	Niesky towards Görlitz
Location
- Location within Saxony

Petershain/Hóznica (German: Haltepunkt Petershain; Upper Sorbian: Dwórnišćo Hóznica) is a railway station in the municipality of Quitzdorf am See, Saxony, Germany. The station lies on the Węgliniec–Roßlau railway. Train services are operated by Ostdeutsche Eisenbahn.

== Train services ==
The station is served by the following services:

- regional service OE 64 Hoyerswerda - Görlitz

== Images ==
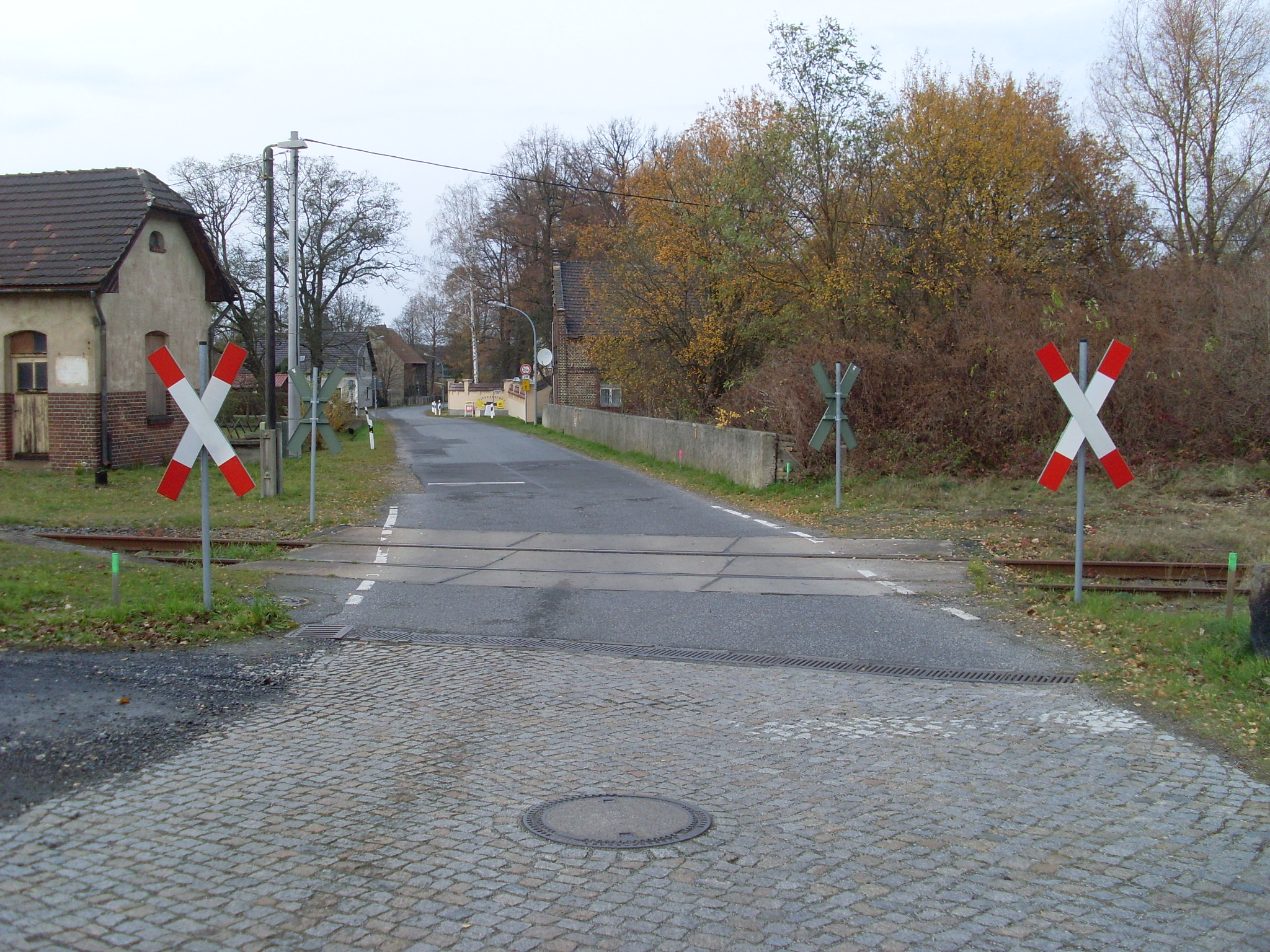
Level crossing, 2015

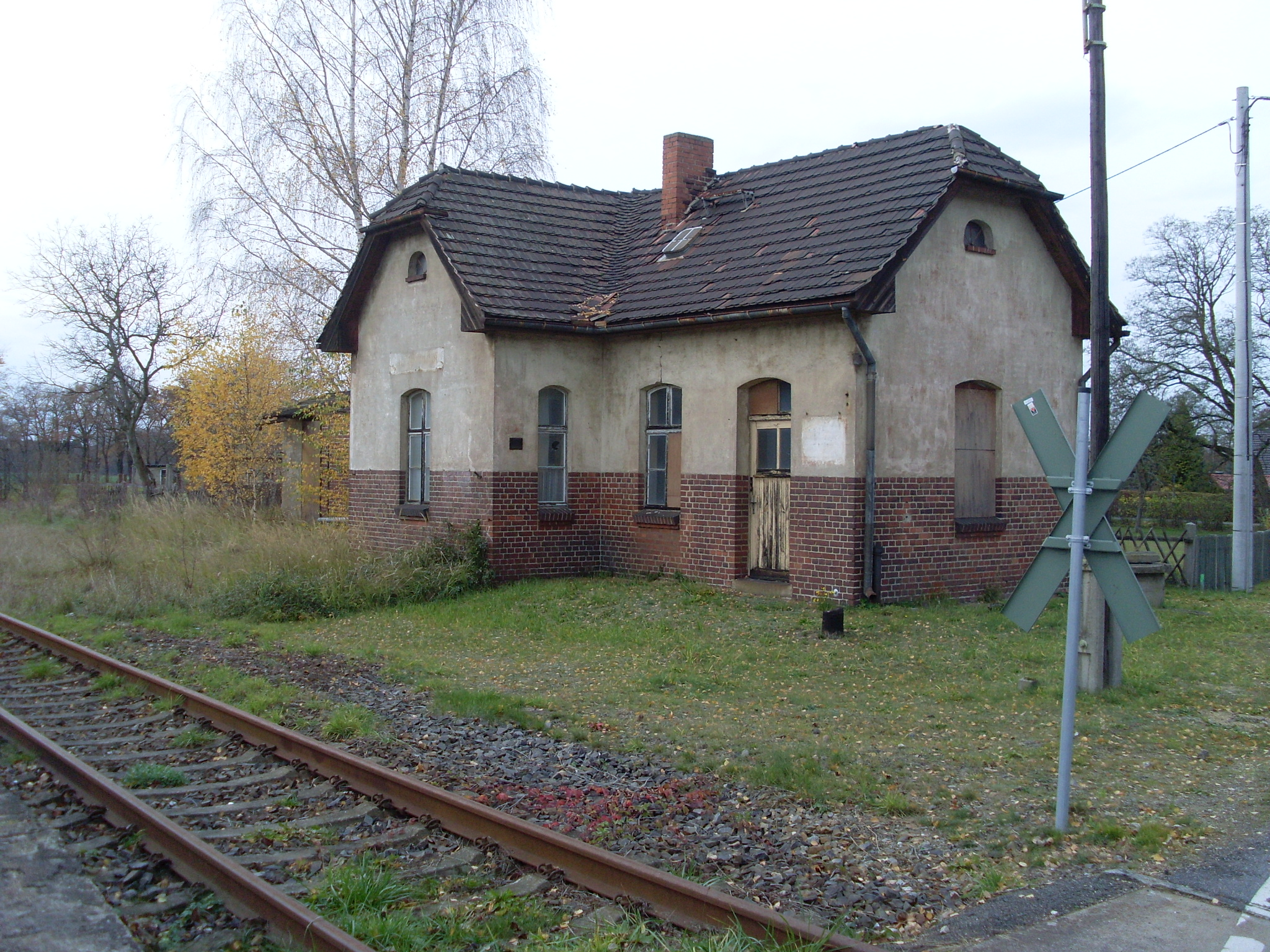
Closed building, 2015
