= Mücka station =

Railway station in Mücka, Germany

Mücka Mikow
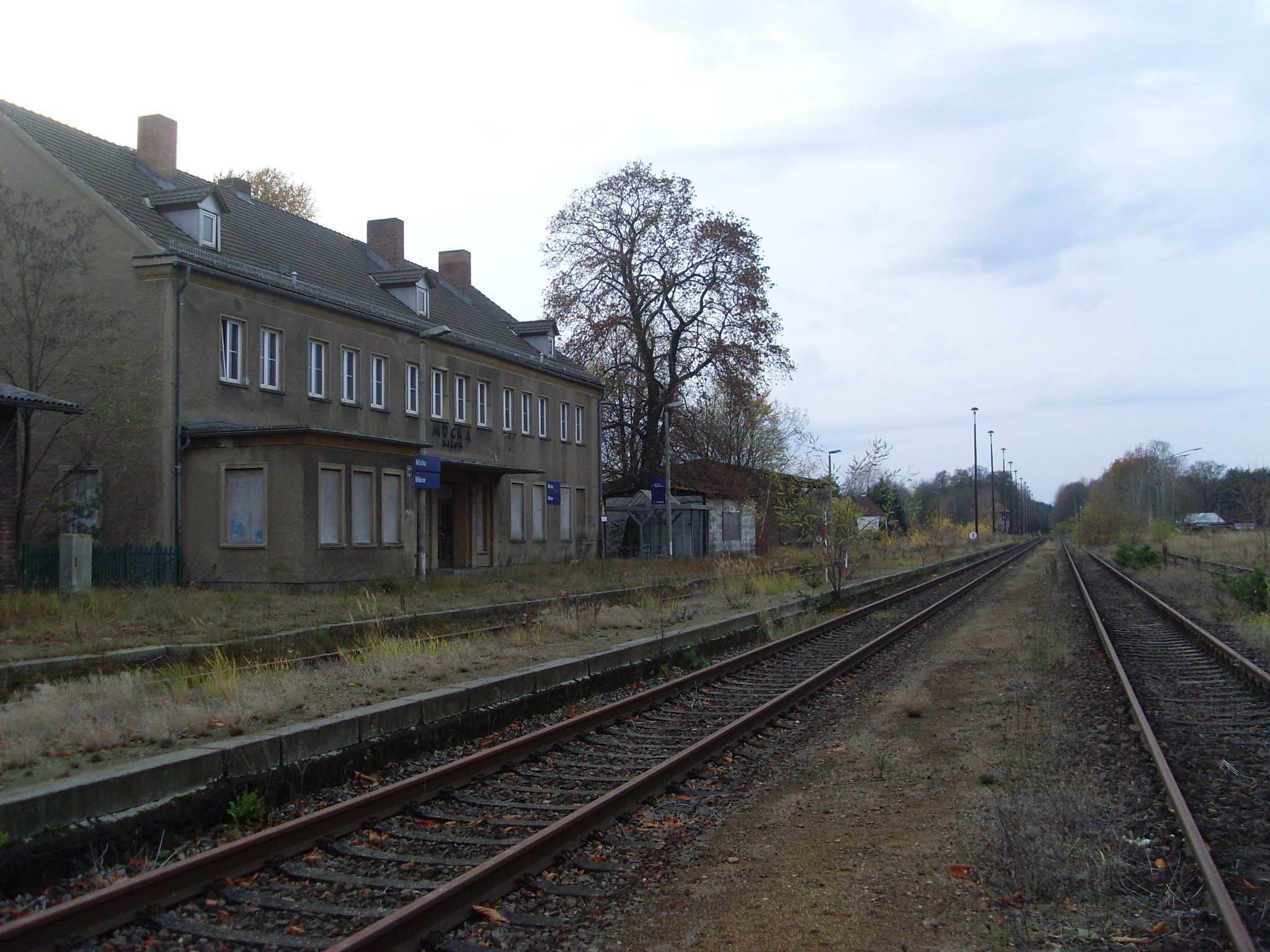
- Mücka railway station (in 2015 before track modernisation and electrification started)

General information
- Location: Mücka, Saxony, Germany
- Coordinates: 51°19′10″N 14°42′33″E
- Line: Węgliniec–Roßlau railway
- Platforms: 2
- Tracks: 3

Services
Preceding station	Ostdeutsche Eisenbahn	Following station
Klitten towards Hoyerswerda	RB 64	Petershain towards Görlitz
Location
- Location within Saxony

Mücka/Mikow (German: Bahnhof Mücka; Upper Sorbian: Dwórnišćo Mikow) is a railway station in the village of Mücka, Saxony, Germany. The station lies on the Węgliniec–Roßlau railway, train services are operated by Ostdeutsche Eisenbahn.

== Train services ==
The station is served by the following services:

- Regional service OE 64 Hoyerswerda - Görlitz
