= Kodersdorf station =

Railway station in Saxony, Germany

Kodersdorf

General information
- Location: Am Bahnhof 1, 02923 Kodersdorf, Saxony, Germany
- Coordinates: 51°15′34″N 14°54′58″E
- System: Hp
- Line: Berlin–Görlitz railway
- Platforms: 1
- Tracks: 1

Other information
- Station code: 3305
- DS100 code: BKOD
- Category: 6
- Website: www.bahnhof.de

Services
Preceding station	Ostdeutsche Eisenbahn	Following station
Niesky towards Hoyerswerda	RB 64	Görlitz Terminus
Horka towards Cottbus Hbf	RB 65	Görlitz towards Zittau
Location
- Location within Saxony

Kodersdorf (German: Bahnhof Kodersdorf) is a railway station within the municipality of Horka, Saxony, Germany. Closest populated places are Kodersdorf and Mückenhain, though. The station lies on the Berlin–Görlitz railway, train services are operated by Ostdeutsche Eisenbahn.

== Train services ==
The station is served by the following services:

- regional service OE 64 Hoyerswerda – Görlitz
- regional service OE 65 Cottbus – Weißwasser – Görlitz – Zittau

Service OE 65 runs hourly in each direction. Due to construction works along Węgliniec–Roßlau railway OE 64 is temporarily not operating.
