= Klitten station =

Railway station in Boxberg, Germany

Klitten Klětno
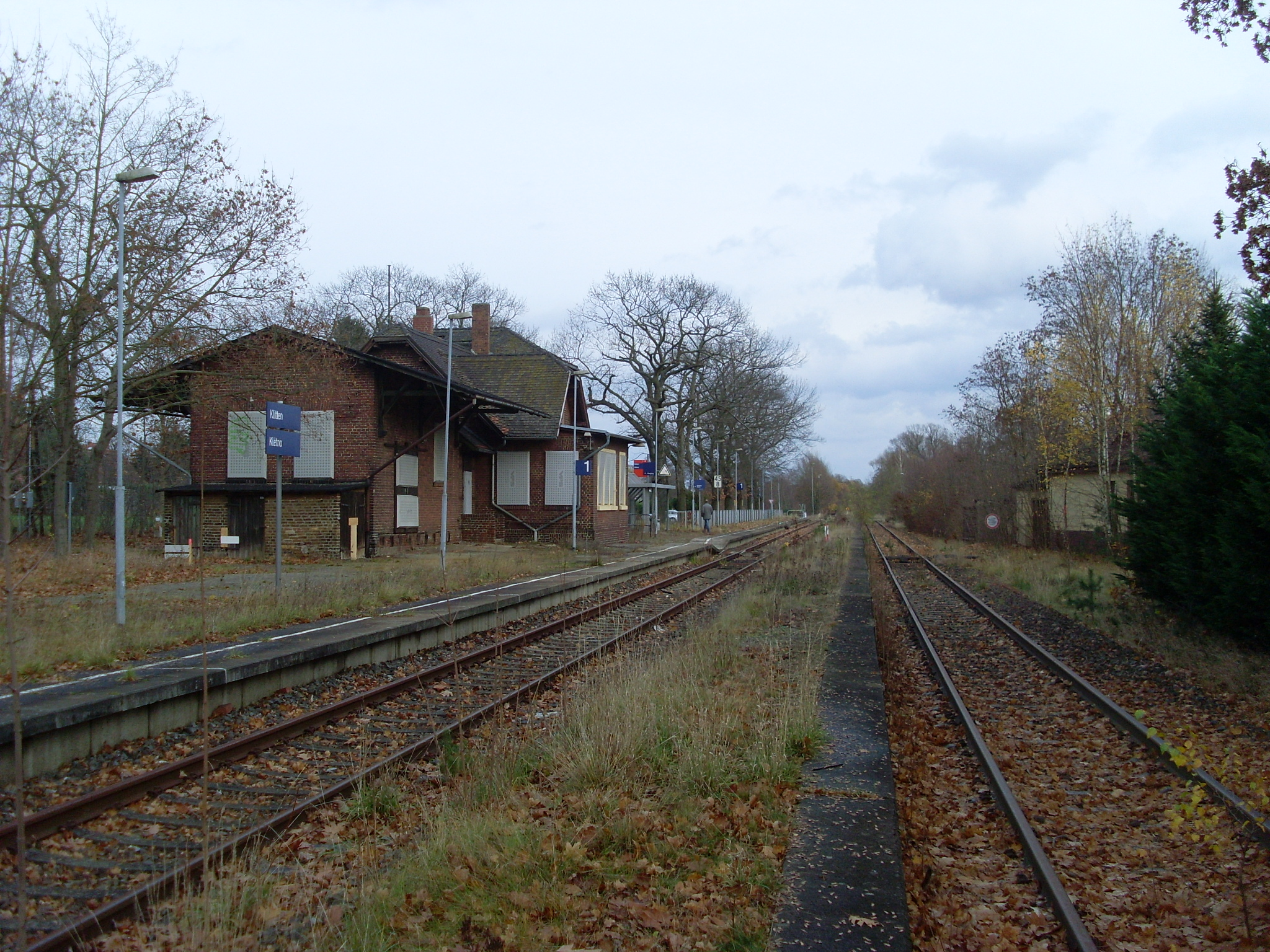
- Klitten railway station (before reconstruction started in 2015)

General information
- Location: Klitten, Saxony, Germany
- Coordinates: 51°20′56″N 14°35′20″E
- Owner: Deutsche Bahn
- Operator: DB Station&Service
- Line: Węgliniec–Roßlau railway
- Platforms: 2
- Tracks: 2

Services
| Preceding station | Ostdeutsche Eisenbahn | Following station |
|---|---|---|
| Uhyst towards Hoyerswerda | RB 64 | Mücka towards Görlitz |
Location
- Location within Saxony Location within Germany Location within Europe

Klitten/Klětno (German: Bahnhof Klitten; Upper Sorbian: Dwórnišćo Klětno) is a railway station near the village of Klitten, Boxberg municipality, Saxony, Germany. The station lies on the Węgliniec–Roßlau railway, train services are operated by Ostdeutsche Eisenbahn.

== Train services ==
The station is served by the following services:

- regional service OE 64 Hoyerswerda - Görlitz

Train services are currently (as of 2012) not operating between Hoyerswerda and Klitten. These services are replaced by buses.

== Images ==
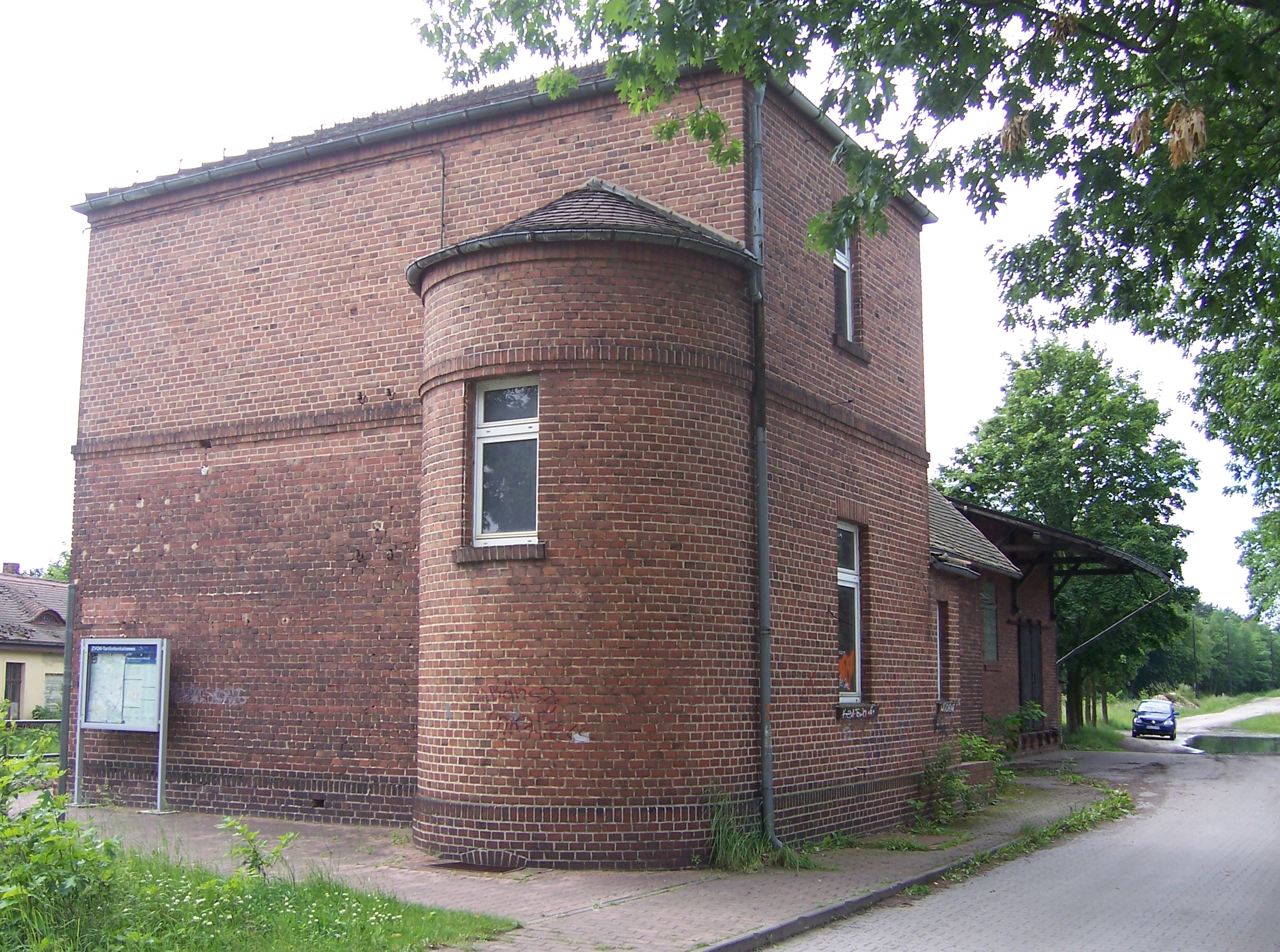
Station building in 2009

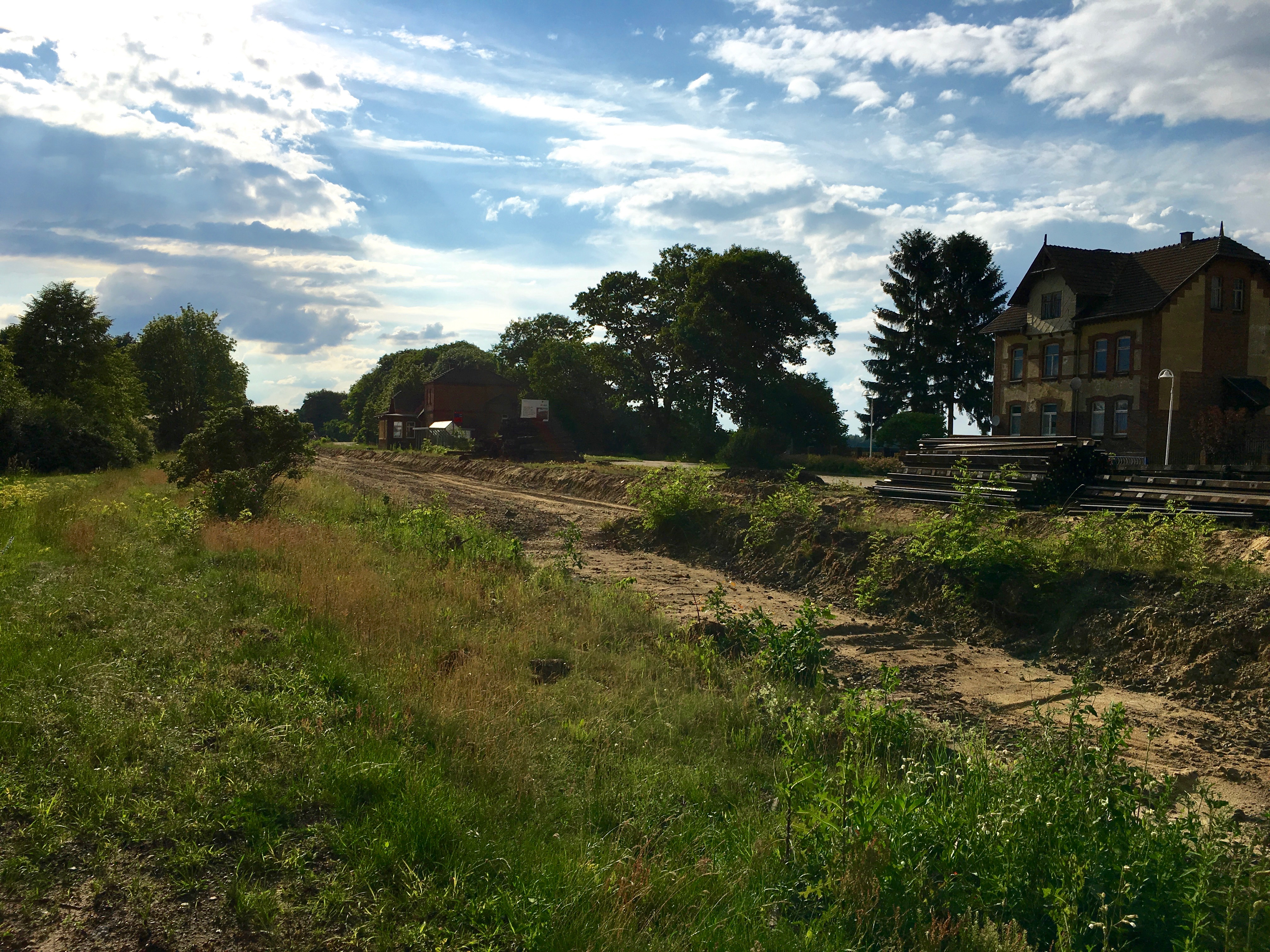
Construction work in 2016
