= Mücka =

Mücka/Mikow
- Municipality
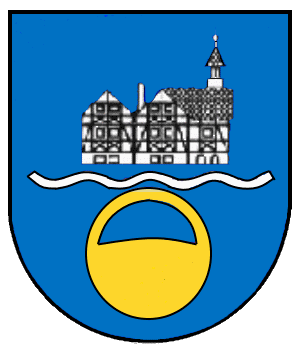
- Coat of arms

- Location of Mücka/Mikow within Görlitz district
- Interactive map of Mücka/Mikow
- Location within Germany Location within Saxony
- Coordinates: 51°19′N 14°42′E
- Country: Germany
- State: Saxony
- District: Görlitz
- Municipal assoc.: Diehsa
- Subdivisions: 3

Government
  - Mayor (2022–29): Uwe Blättner

Area
  - Total: 24.31 km^{2} (9.39 sq mi)
- Elevation: 142 m (466 ft)

Population (2025-12-31)
  - Total: 936
  - Density: 38.5/km^{2} (99.7/sq mi)
- Time zone: UTC+01:00 (CET)
  - Summer (DST): UTC+02:00 (CEST)
- Postal codes: 02906
- Dialling codes: 035893
- Vehicle registration: GR, LÖB, NOL, NY, WSW, ZI

Mücka (German) or Mikow (Upper Sorbian, pronounced [ˈmʲikɔf]) is a municipality in the district of Görlitz, Saxony, Germany.

The municipality is part of the recognized Sorbian settlement area in Saxony. Upper Sorbian has an official status next to German, all villages bear names in both languages.

Four villages are in the municipality; names in German and Upper Sorbian, populations as of 2022:

- Mücka/Mikow, 608 inhabitants
- Förstgen/Dołha Boršć, 228 inh.
- Förstgen-Ost/Dołha Boršć-Wuchod, 101 inh. – the village's traditional name is Oelsa/Wolšina
- Leipgen/Lipinki, 34 inh.

== History and notable places ==
The area is within the UNESCO Biosphere Reserve Upper Lausitz Heath and Pond Landscape, part of the World Network of Biosphere Reserves.

The Church of Förstgen/Dołha Boršć dates from the 16th century. Förstgen/Dołha Boršć was initially in the parish of Baruth/Bart. The church was damaged in the Second World War. After renovations, it officially reopened in 1955.

In the time of the GDR, the areas of the present municipality were in the district/Kreis Niesky in the Bezirk Dresden. The municipality of Mücka/Mikow was created in 1994.

Mücka/Mikow train station is on the Węgliniec–Roßlau railway.

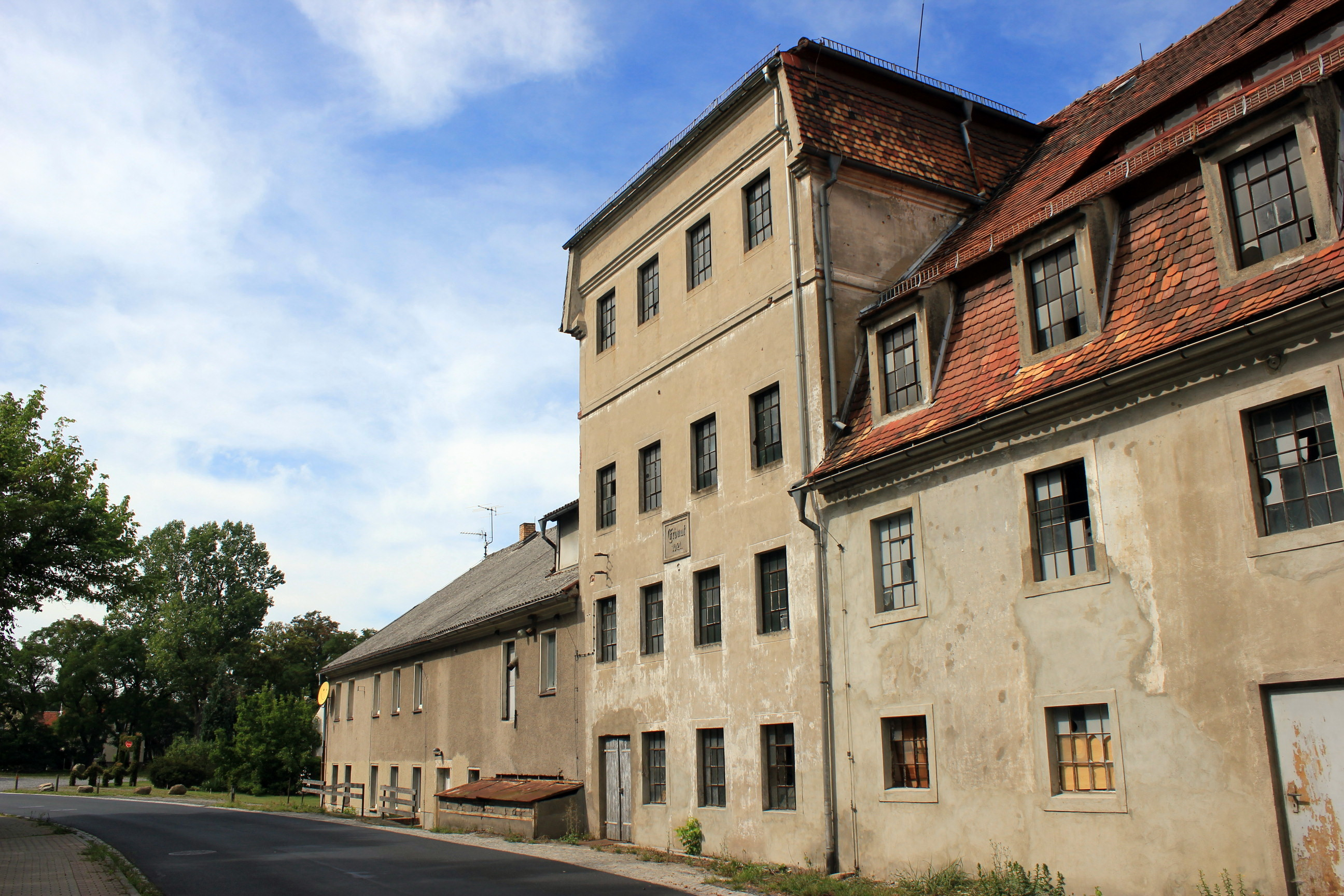
Former Mehling water mill on Bautzener Straße

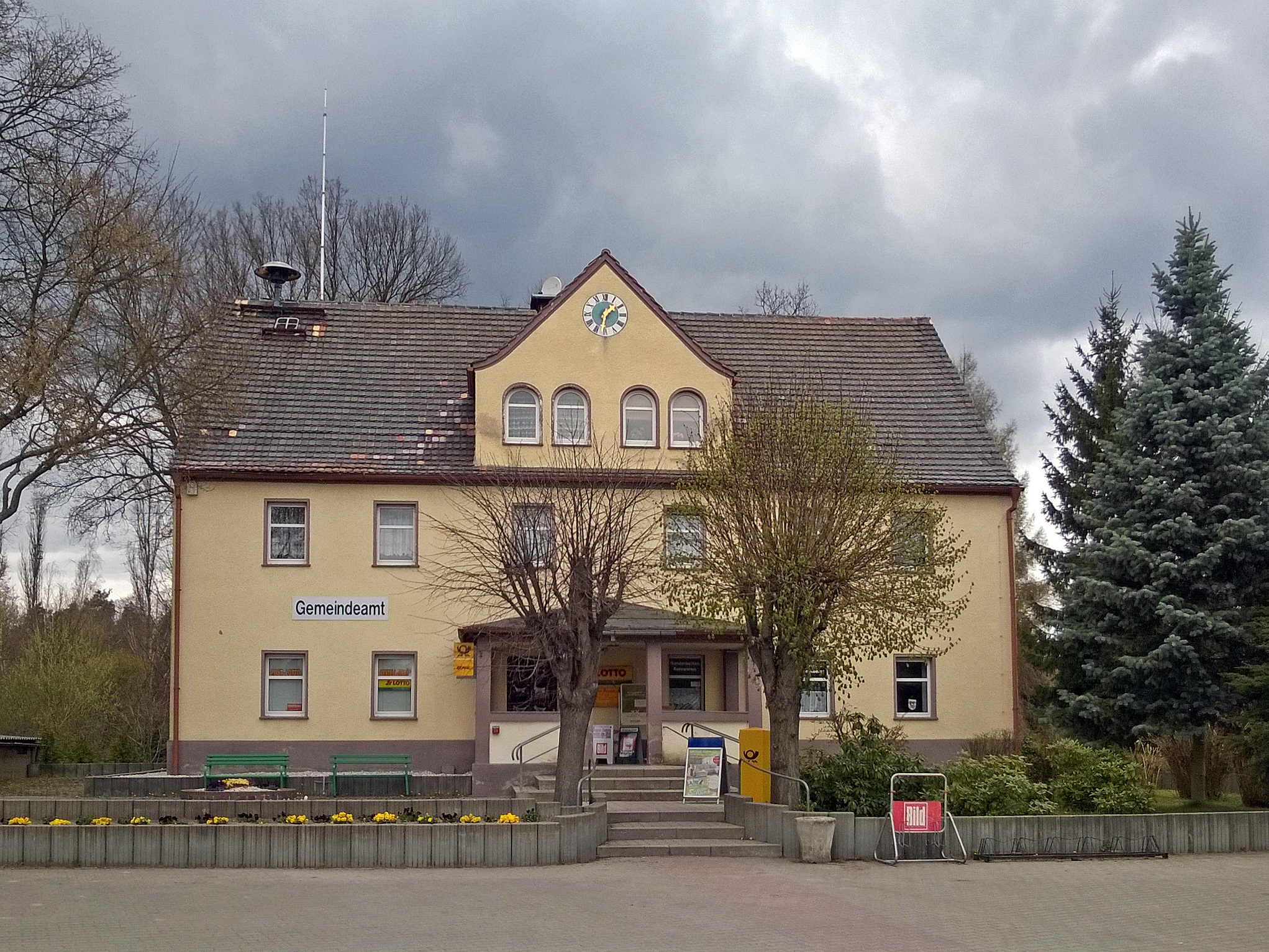
Town hall

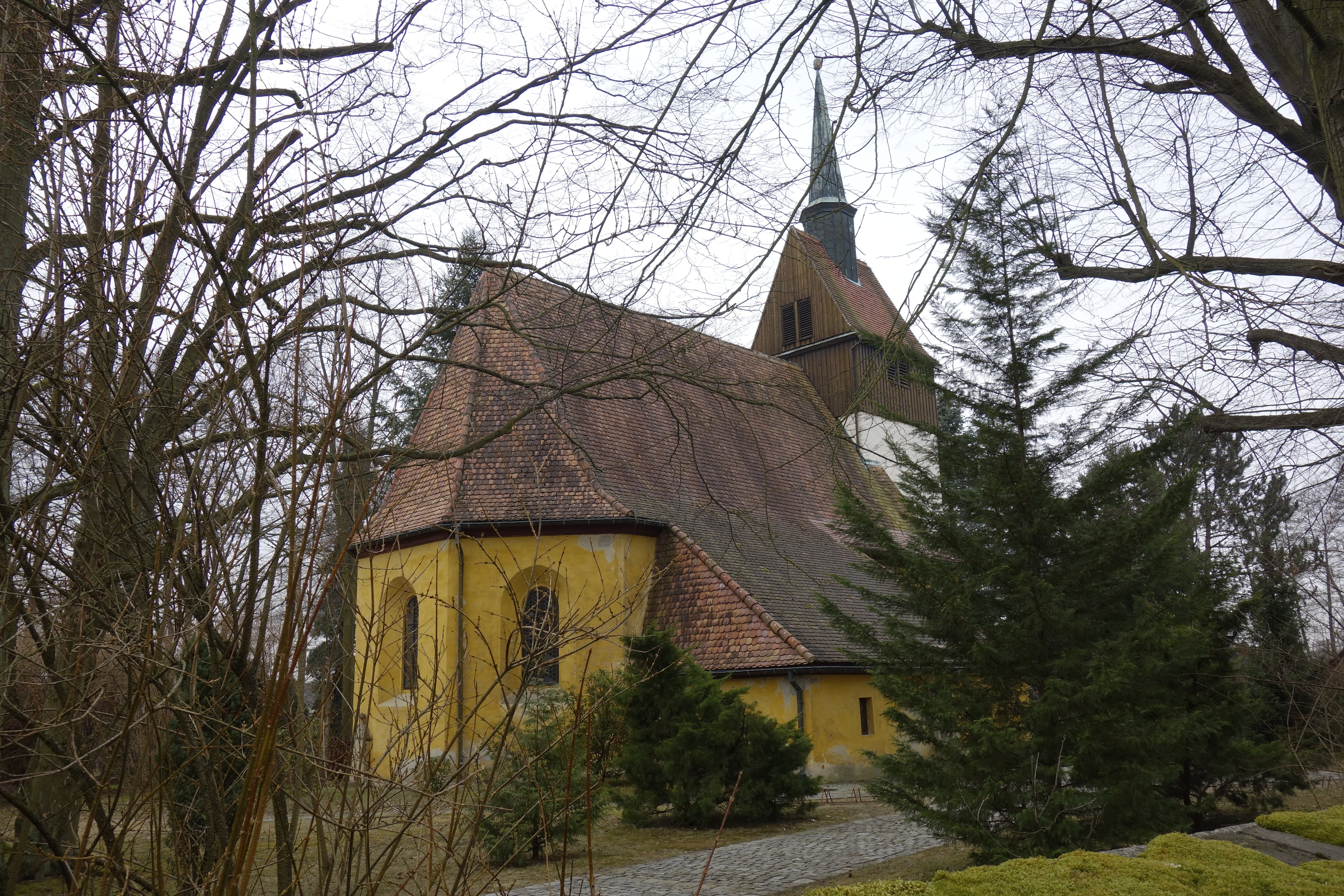
Church of Förstgen/Dołha Boršć
