= Ruhland station =

Railway station in Ruhland, Germany

Ruhland
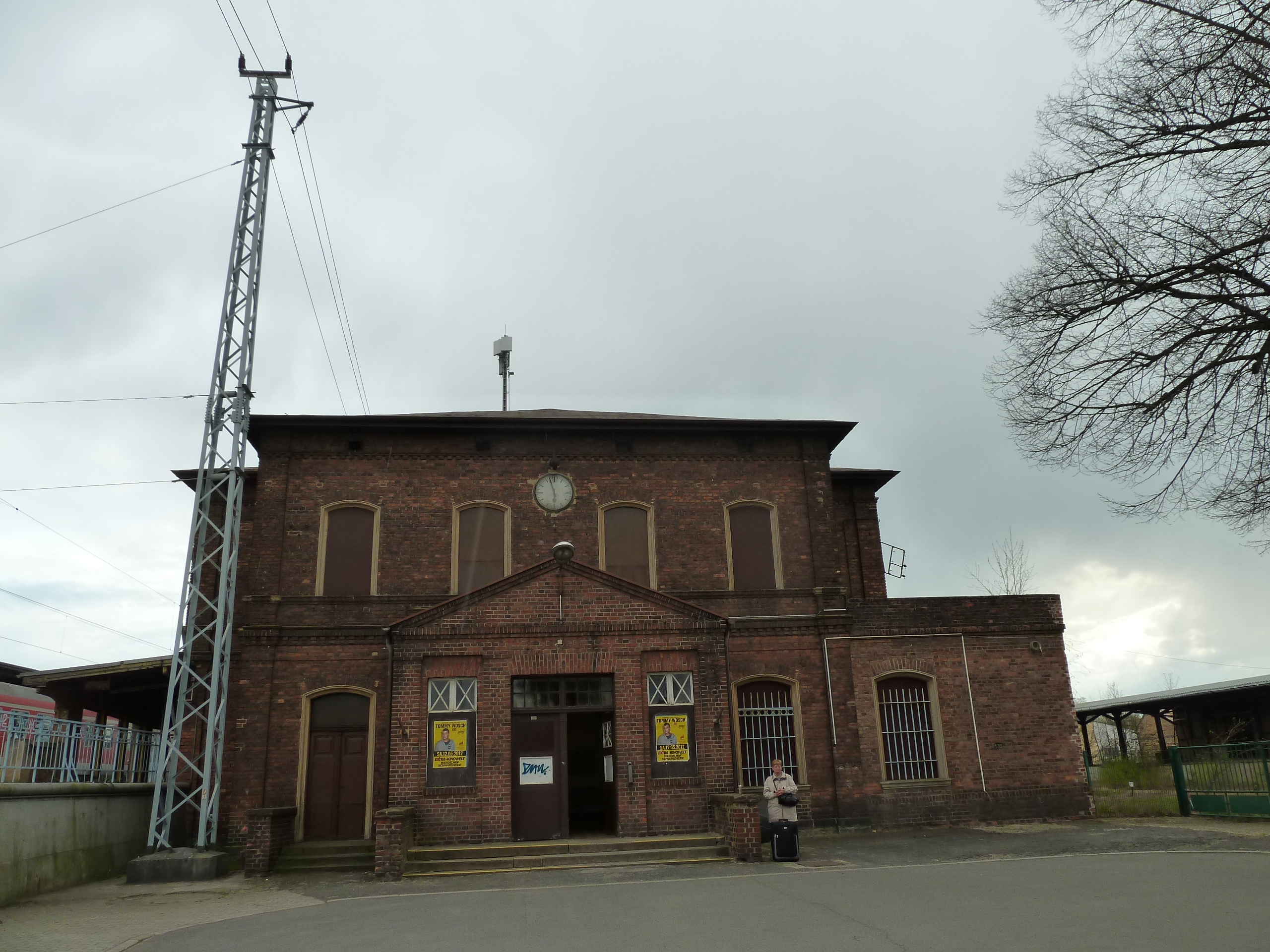
- Main building and station forecourt

General information
- Location: Am Bahnhof, Ruhland, Brandenburg; Germany
- Coordinates: 51°27′11″N 13°51′58″E
- Owner: Deutsche Bahn
- Operator: DB Netz; DB Station&Service
- Lines: Großenhain–Cottbus; Węgliniec–Roßlau; BASF siding (formerly ZFE-Ruhland–Finsterwalde line)
- Platforms: 4

Construction
- Accessible: Yes

Other information
- Station code: 5422
- DS100 code: BRU
- IBNR: 8010308
- Category: 5
- Fare zone: : 7963
- Website: www.bahnhof.de

History
- Opened: 20 April 1870

Services
Preceding station	DB Regio Nordost	Following station
Lauchhammer towards Leipzig Hbf	RE 11	Hosena towards Hoyerswerda
Lauchhammer towards Elsterwerda	RE 13	Senftenberg towards Cottbus Hbf
Ortrand towards Dresden Hbf	RE 15	Hosena towards Hoyerswerda
Ortrand towards Dresden Hbf	RE 18	Senftenberg towards Cottbus Hbf
Lauchhammer towards Falkenberg (Elster)	RB 49	Schwarzheide Ost towards Cottbus Hbf
Location
- Location within Brandenburg Location within Germany Location within Europe

Ruhland station is located in the town of Ruhland in northwestern Upper Lusatia in the south of the German state of Brandenburg on the Großenhain–Cottbus railway and the Węgliniec–Roßlau railway. The station is a heritage-listed building.

== History ==
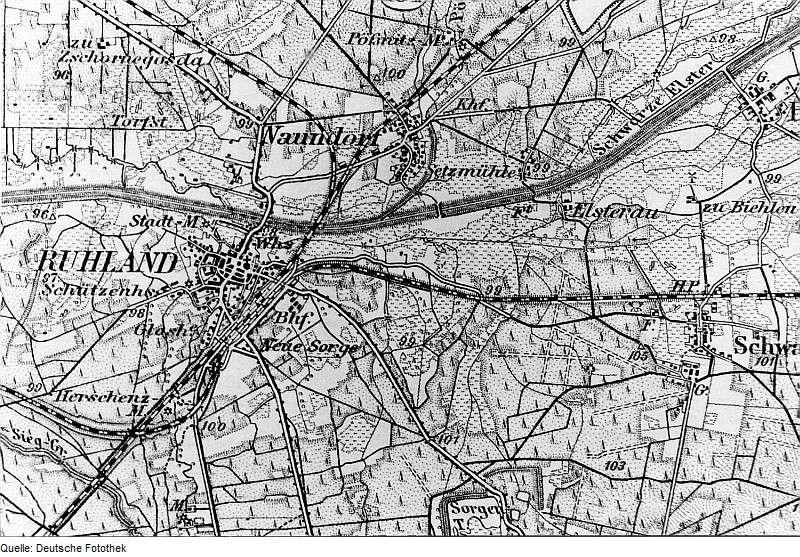
Historical map of Ruhland node

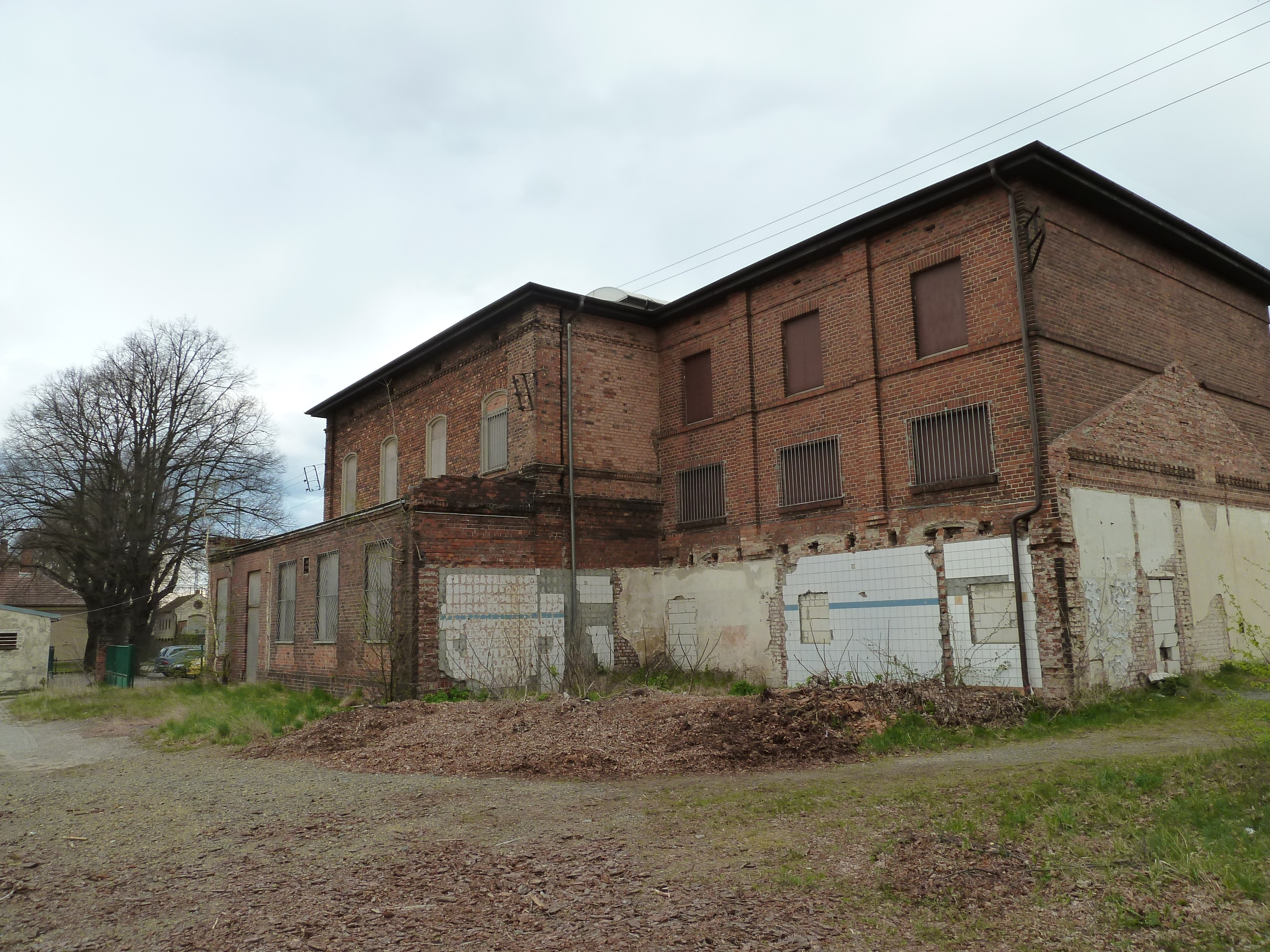
Rear view of Ruhland station, remnants of the former station kitchen and sanitary facilities

The Cottbus-Großenhain Railway Company (Cottbus-Großenhainer Eisenbahn-Gesellschaft) was founded at the end of the 19th century by the railway financier Karl Eduard Zachariae von Lingenthal. Ruhland station began operations with the opening of the Großenhain–Cottbus railway on 20 April 1870. It became the administrative seat of the Upper Lusatian Railway Company (Oberlausitzer Eisenbahn-Gesellschaft), when it was established on 11 October 1871. The Upper Lusatian Railway opened the Kohlfurt (now Węgliniec)–Horka–Ruhland railway line on 1 June 1874. Ruhland became an important hub in the Prussian railway network. On 1 September 1883 the company and Ruhland station were taken over by the Prussian state. It operated direct trains to Magdeburg, Breslau (now Wrocław) in Lower Silesia, Dresden, Prague and Cottbus. Today, the station, which was once a hub of services between the Province of Lower Silesia, the Duchy of Anhalt and the Kingdom of Saxony, is only a stop for regional traffic.

On 31 January 2016, reconstruction work began on the tracks and platforms. The dilapidated bridges on Elsterbogen-Bernsdorfer Straße were to be replaced and the L 57 would be lowered, allowing increase use by road transport.

=== Intermodal terminal ===
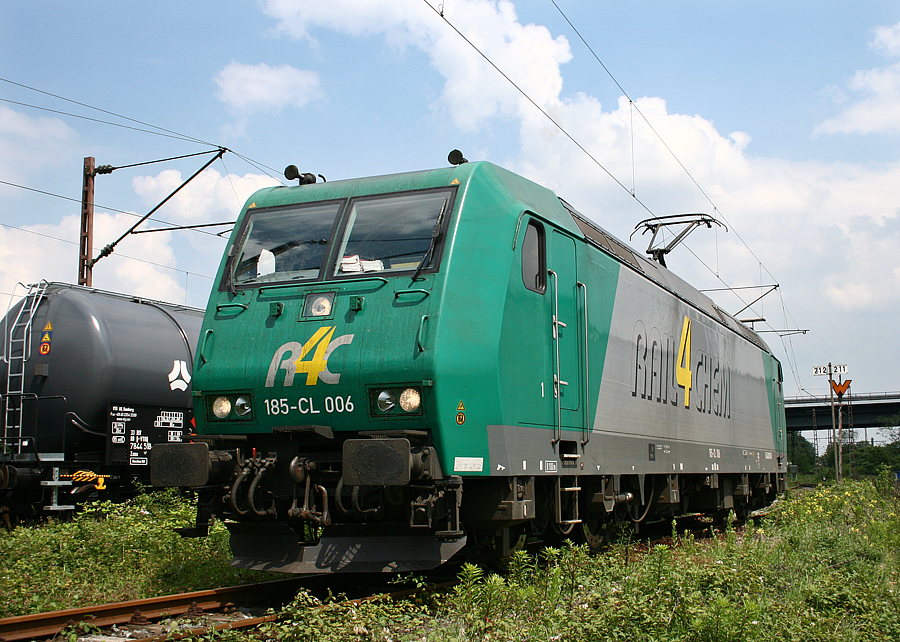
Electric locomotive of the Rail4Chem between Ruhland and BASF Schwarzheide (in the background is the bridge of the B169)

Ruhland station has a significant role in handling traffic to and from the premises of BASF Schwarzheide GmbH, which is about three kilometres away in the neighbouring town of Schwarzheide. Currently about 60,000 freight movements are handled annually at the station.

== Former branch lines ==
In 1875, the Upper Lusatian Railway Company opened a branch line from Ruhland to the Lauchhammer iron works that later connected to the Zschipkau-Finsterwalde Railway (Schipkau-Finsterwalder Eisenbahn, ZFE). Passenger services closed in 1962.

The section from Ruhland to Lauchhammer Ost still serves as an industrial siding, mainly for handling the traffic from BASF Schwarzheide to and from BASF’s factories in Ludwigshafen am Rhein.

== Services ==
=== Rail services ===
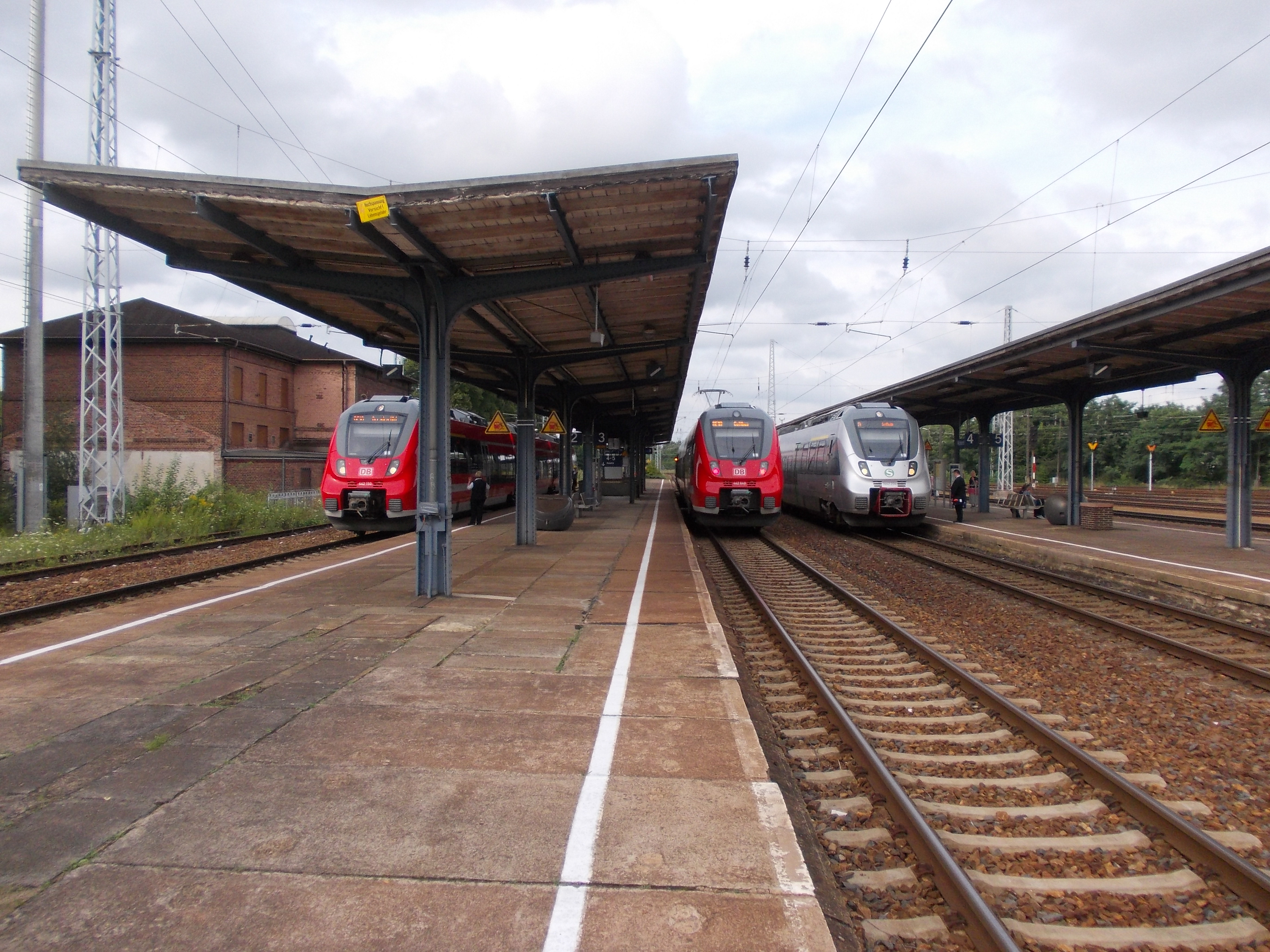
Three Bombardier Talent 2 electric multiple units of DB Regio in July 2014; left is RE 18 to Dresden, middle RE 18 to Cottbus, right S4 to Geithain

The following services stop at Ruhland station (as of 25 June 2024):

Line	Route	Frequency (min)	Operator
RE 11	Hoyerswerda – Ruhland – Elsterwerda-Biehla – Falkenberg (Elster) – Torgau – Eilenburg – Leipzig	120	DB Regio Nordost
RE 13	Cottbus – Senftenberg – Ruhland – Elsterwerda-Biehla – Elsterwerda	120	DB Regio Nordost
RE 15	Hoyerswerda – Ruhland – Großenhain – Priestewitz – Dresden	120	DB Regio Nordost
RE 18	Cottbus – Senftenberg – Ruhland – Großenhain – Priestewitz – Dresden	120	DB Regio Nordost
RB 49	Cottbus – Senftenberg – Ruhland – Elsterwerda-Biehla – Falkenberg (Elster)	120	DB Regio Nordost

A pair of Regionalbahn RB 49 services from Cottbus to Falkenberg (Elster) is extended daily to/from Stralsund via Berlin as Regional-Express RE 5.

=== Bus services ===
The station is also connected by several bus services: routes 601 (Senftenberg–Lauchammer), 610 (Ruhland–Großräschen), 611 (Schwarzheide–Ruhland–Guteborn–Hosena/Jannowitz) and 609 (Schwarzheide–Buckersdorf/Großmehlen/Ortrand).
