= Niesky station =

Railway station in Niesky, Germany

Niesky Niska
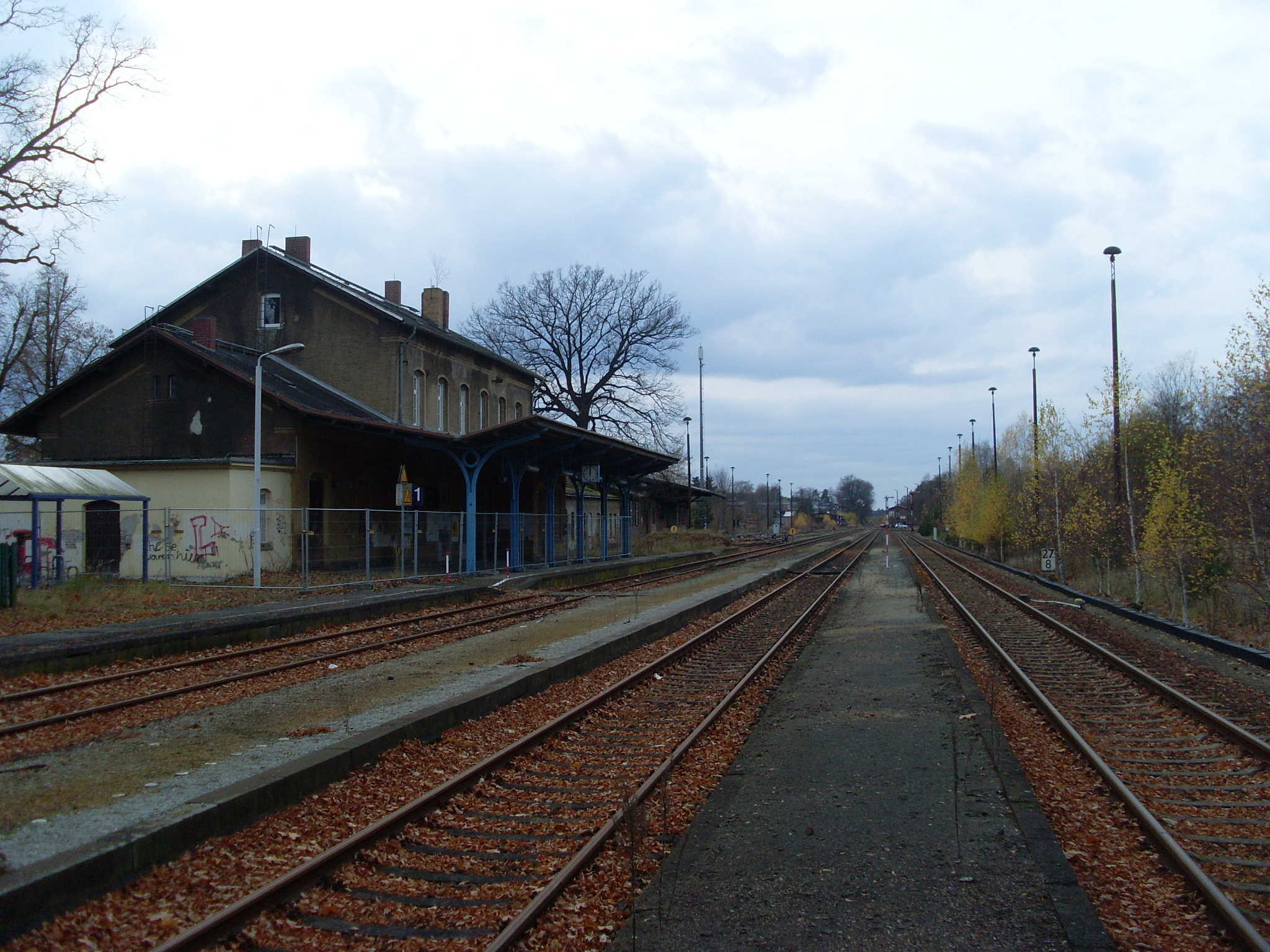
- Niesky railway station (November 2015) before modernisation and electrification of this railway line started

General information
- Location: Am Bahnhof; 02906 Niesky; Saxony; Germany
- Coordinates: 51°17′54″N 14°50′00″E
- Elevation: 171 m (561 ft)
- Owner: Deutsche Bahn
- Operator: DB Station&Service
- Lines: Węgliniec–Roßlau railway (KBS 229)
- Platforms: 2 side platforms
- Tracks: 4
- Train operators: ODEG
- Connections: RB 64; 105 106 131 133 134 135 138 141 142 255 262

Construction
- Parking: yes
- Cycle facilities: yes
- Accessible: yes

Other information
- Station code: 4552
- DS100 code: BNY
- IBNR: 8013493
- Category: 6
- Fare zone: ZVON
- Website: www.bahnhof.de

Services
Preceding station	Ostdeutsche Eisenbahn	Following station
Petershain towards Hoyerswerda	RB 64	Kodersdorf towards Görlitz
Location
- Location within Saxony Location within Germany Location within Europe

Niesky/Niska (German: Bahnhof Niesky; Upper Sorbian: Dwórnišćo Niska) is a railway station in the town of Niesky, Saxony, Germany. The station lies on the Węgliniec–Roßlau railway, train services are operated by Ostdeutsche Eisenbahn.

== Train services ==
The station is served by the following services:

- regional service RB 64 Hoyerswerda – Görlitz

== Images ==
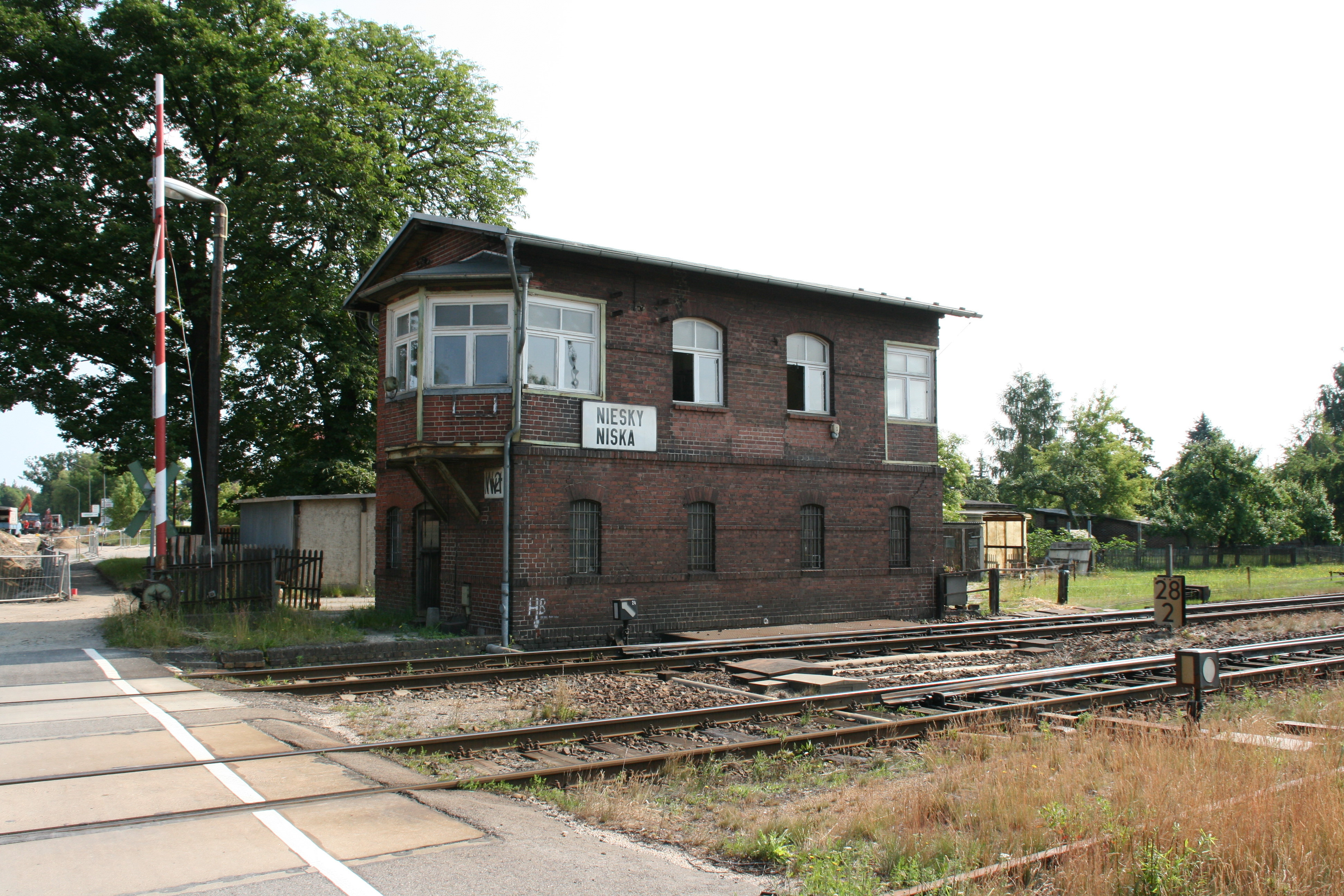
Signal box

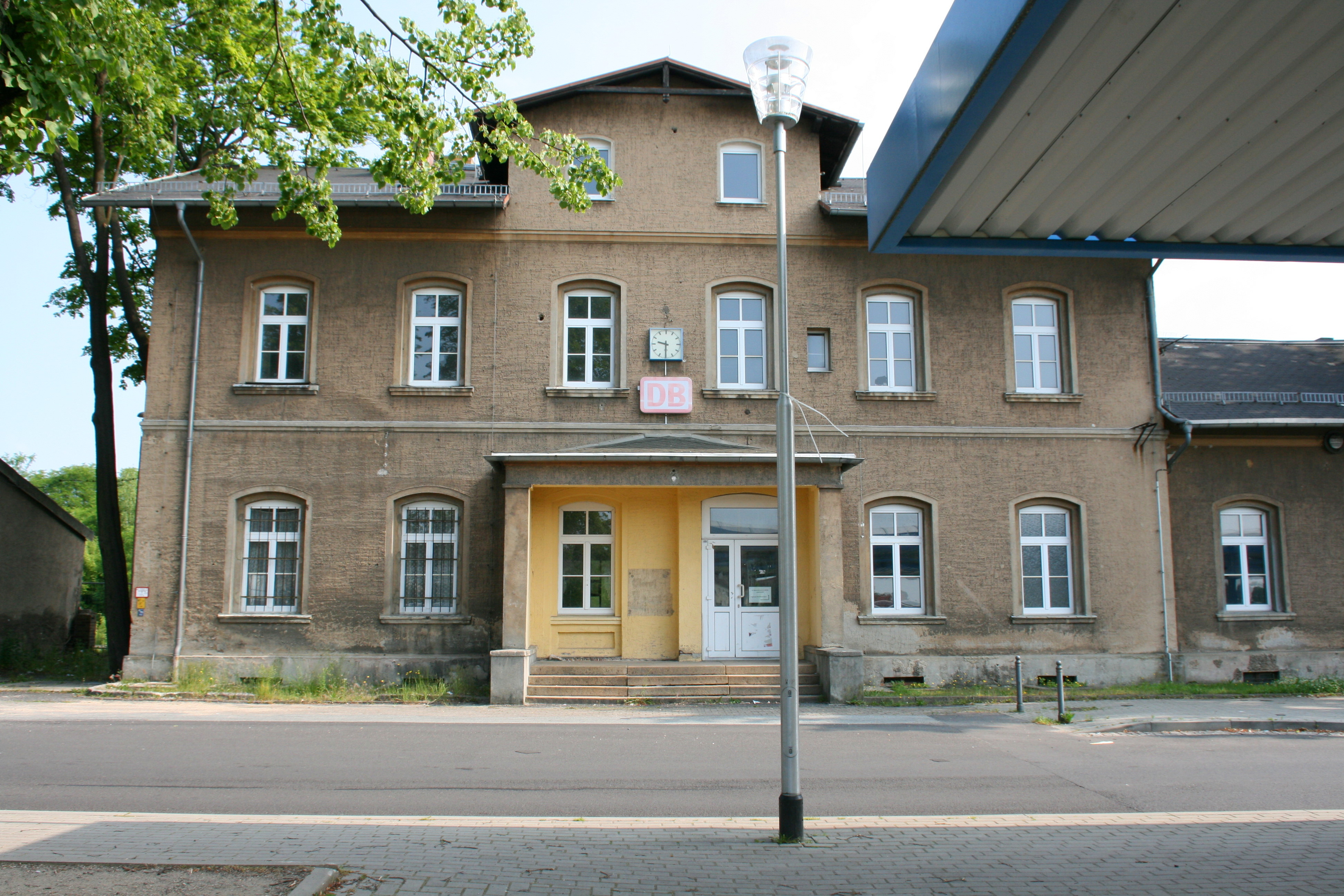
Station building on the street Am Bahnhof
