= Hosena station =

Railway station in Senftenberg, Germany

Hosena
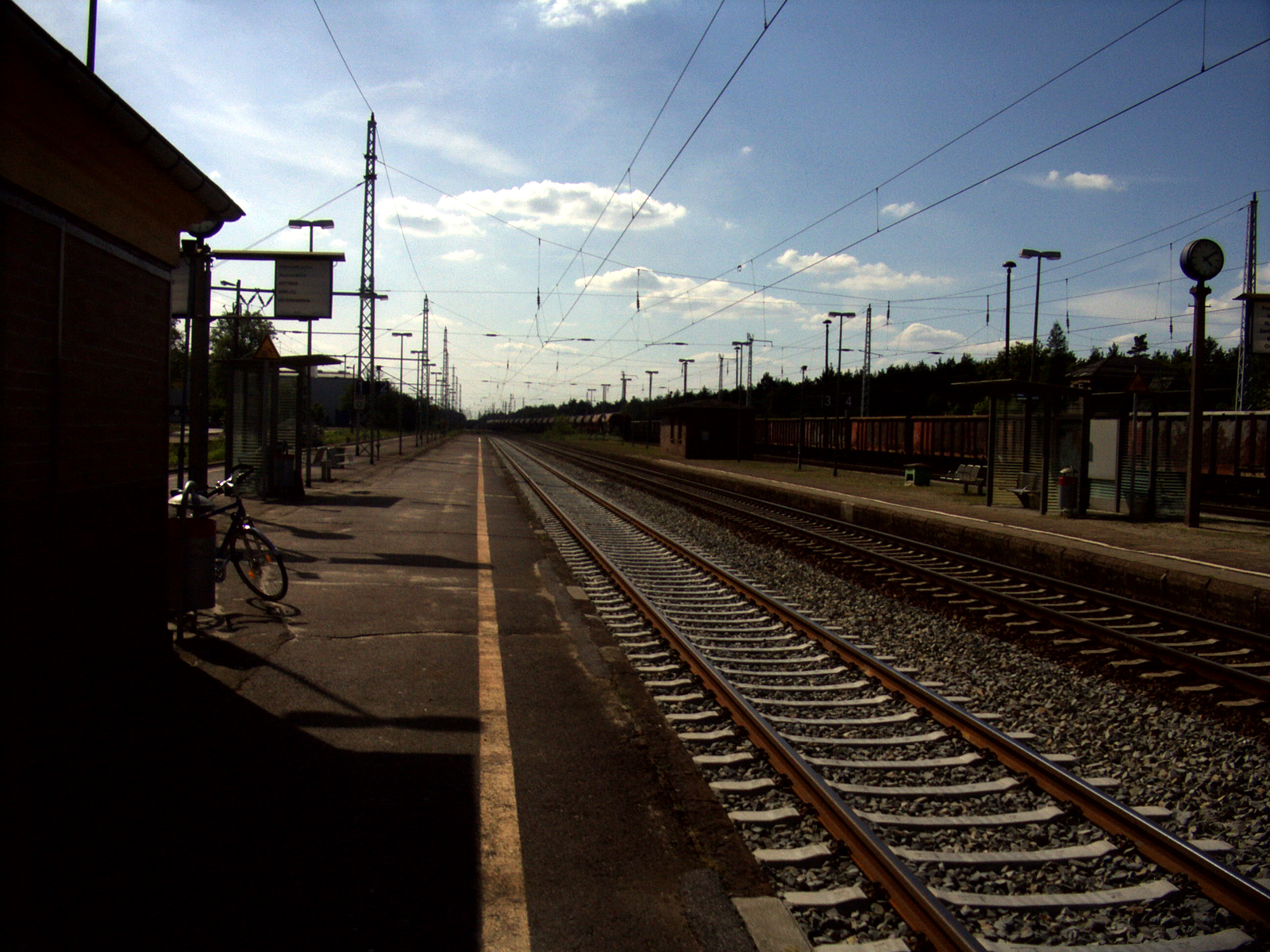
- Hosena station, platforms

General information
- Location: Hosena, Brandenburg; Germany
- Coordinates: 51°27′18″N 14°01′30″E
- Lines: Lübbenau–Kamenz (Sachs) (135.13 km); Węgliniec–Roßlau (87.91 km)
- Platforms: 4

Construction
- Accessible: No

Other information
- Station code: 2834
- DS100 code: BHC
- Category: 5
- Fare zone: : 7965
- Website: www.bahnhof.de

History
- Opened: 1874

Services
Preceding station	DB Regio Nordost	Following station
Ruhland towards Leipzig Hbf	RE 11	Lauta towards Hoyerswerda
Ruhland towards Dresden Hbf	RE 15	Lauta towards Hoyerswerda
Location
- Location within Brandenburg Location within Germany Location within Europe

Hosena station (Hohenbocka station until 2000) is a station at the junction of the Węgliniec–Roßlau railway and the Lübbenau–Kamenz railway. The station is located in the southeast of the German state of Brandenburg in the village of Hosena, north of the village of Hohenbocka.

Hosena station, the piers of the former elevated railway bridge towards Kamenz can be seen in the background

The station was built in 1873 as a “tower station” (German: Turmbahnhof, a two level interchange station) on the Lübbenau-Kamenz and Węgliniec (then called Kohlfurt)–Roßlau railways. Remains of the railway bridge of the Lübbenau-Kamenz line still exist.

== History ==
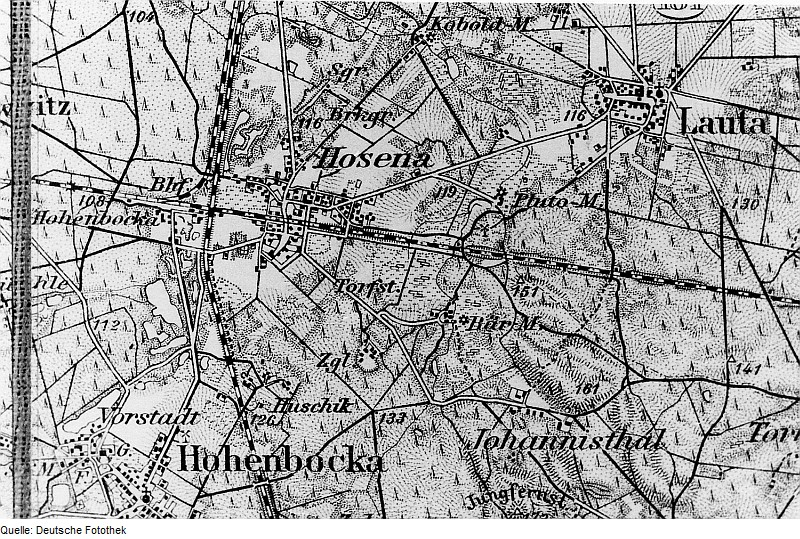
Historic map of Hosena rail transport hub

Remains of the old Hosena station building

At the beginning of April 1871, King Wilhelm I and the Kingdom of Saxony signed a concession for the establishment of the Berlin-Görlitz Railway Company (Berlin-Görlitzer Eisenbahn-Gesellschaft), with the concession giving permission for the construction of a railway connecting Senftenberg to the Kamenz–Pirna railway. The first construction work began on 1 September 1871. A treaty was contracted between Saxony and Prussia on 7 December 1871, which regulated the carrying out of construction on the Lübbenau–Calau–Senftenberg–Kamenz route. The flat country north of Kamenz, which had few rivers, was favourable for rapid progress and the works proceeded without difficulty. The Prussian border was reached north of Hosena in 1872.

A connecting line of the Cottbus-Großenhain Railway Company running east-west, the later Lower Silesian mainline, was put into operation on 1 June 1874 between Kohlfurt and nearby Ruhland.

The Hosena railway junction became increasingly important at the beginning of the 20th century and in the 1940s. The resurgent lignite and basalt mining in the area led to an ever increasing volume of traffic. With the founding of the German Democratic Republic (GDR), the population in the area doubled on average. It is about 15 kilometres away from Hoyerswerda, which had about 70,000 inhabitants. Population growth, more intense mining operations and the establishment of industry in the Hosena area increased the importance of the station.

A 7.5 km section of the Lübbenau-Kamenz railway line was built between Senftenberg and Hohenbocka (or Hosena) between 1955 and 1957 to avoid an expansion of the Niemtsch (now called Senftenberger See—"Lake Senftenberg") open cast mine, which had been developed in the late 1930s. The new line was built from Hosena to the northwest through the village of Peickwitz and Biehlen and northeast to Brieske, where it connects with the Großenhain–Cottbus railway at the former halt of Brieske. The old line was dismantled north of Hosena and its remains at Hosenaer station is now used as a marshalling yard for the nearby basalt quarry in Koschenberg.

=== 1990–2000 ===
With the end of the GDR and the onset of economic and political change, the rapid development of the station came to a halt. The decline in population growth led to cuts and changes in traffic flows. On 23 May 1998, the passenger rail services on the Hosena–Kamenz section, which are the responsibly of the Verkehrsverbund Oberelbe (Upper Elbe Transport Association), were abandoned.

=== Since 2000 ===
More closures and changes followed. Passenger rail services on the Hosena–Senftenberg section were abandoned on 10 October 2005. Nevertheless, in later years the Regional-Express service between Stralsund and Hoyerswerda and the Regionalbahn between Berlin-Schöneweide and Hoyerswerda route resumed. With the timetable change on 15 December 2013, the former line RE 11 was integrated into the S-Bahn Mitteldeutschland network as line S4. With the timetable change in December 2022, line S4 was shortened to end at Falkenberg (Elster) and replaced by the new Regional-Express line RE11 (Leipzig–Hoyerswerda).

== Rail services ==
In the 2024 timetable the following services stop at Hosena station:

Line	Route	Frequency (min)	Operator
RE 11	Hoyerswerda – Hosena – Ruhland – Falkenberg (Elster) – Eilenburg – Leipzig	120	DB Regio Nordost
RE 15	Hoyerswerda – Hosena – Ruhland – Großenhain Cottb Bf – Dresden	120	DB Regio Nordost

At the timetable change on 15 December 2013, the previous RE 11 service was integrated in the network of the Mitteldeutschland S-Bahn as line S 4.
