= Bielawa Dolna railway station =

Former railway station in south-western Poland

Bielawa Dolna
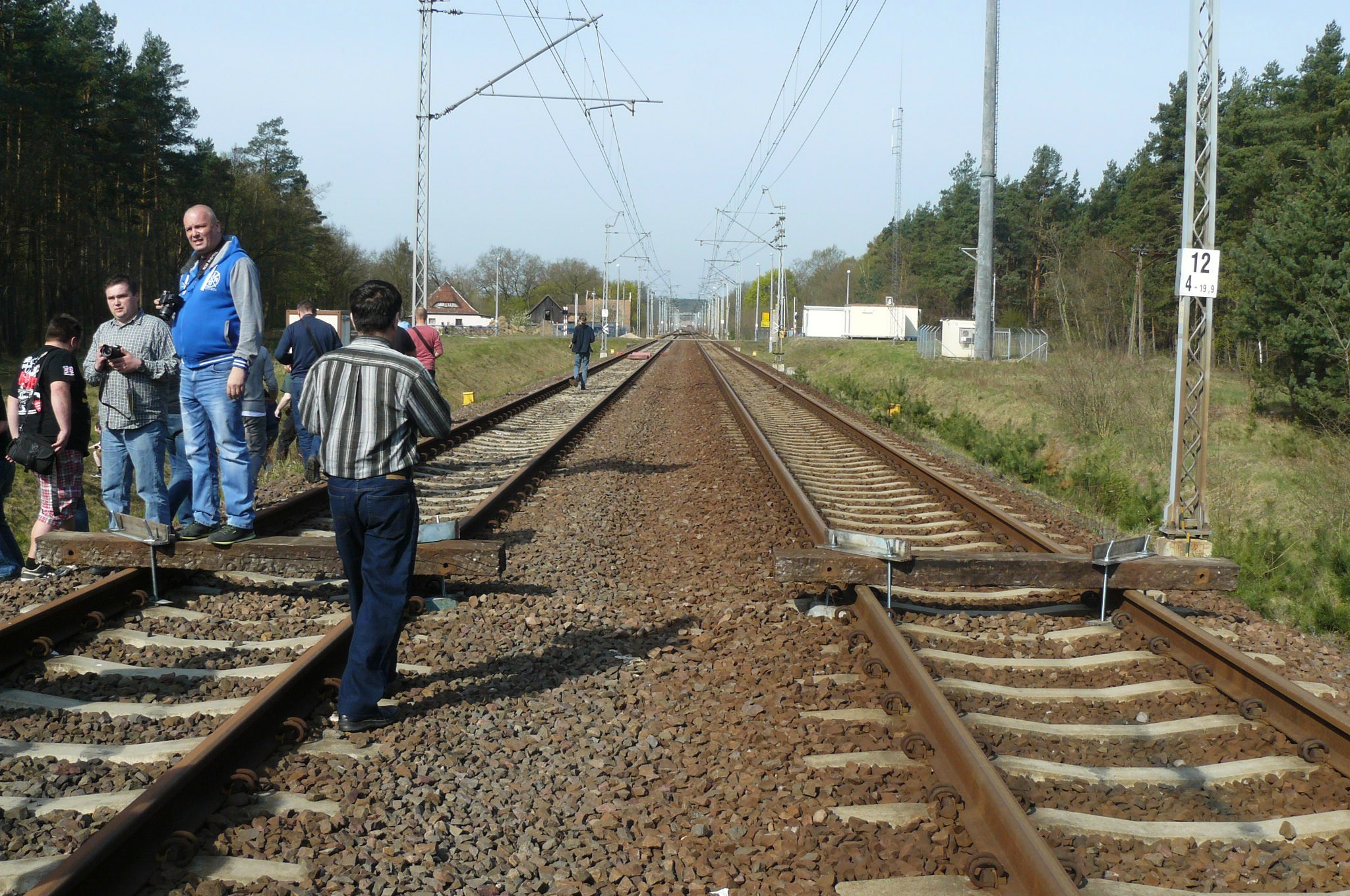
- Site of the former station in 2015

General information
- Location: Bielawa Dolna, Lower Silesian Voivodeship; Poland
- Coordinates: 51°17′12.2″N 15°02′32.1″E
- Owner: Polish State Railways
- Line: Węgliniec–Roßlau railway
- Platforms: 2

History
- Opened: 1 June 1874
- Closed: 14 May 1949
- Former names: Nieder-Bielau (1874–1945); Biała Dolna (1945–1947)
Location
- Location within Poland Location within Lower Silesian Voivodeship

Bielawa Dolna (German: Nieder-Bielau) was a railway station in the village of Bielawa Dolna, Zgorzelec County, within the Lower Silesian Voivodeship in south-western Poland.

Prior to the station's closure, it was the final station before the Węgliniec–Roßlau railway entered Germany, the site of the former station is now a rail junction.

== History ==
The station was opened by Prussian State Railways on 1 June 1874 as Nieder-Bielau. After World War II, the area came under Polish administration. As a result, the station was taken over by Polish State Railways and was renamed to Biała Dolna, which was renamed to its modern name, Bielawa Dolna, in 1947.

Passenger trains continued to serve the station after the war, until 14 May 1949 when the station closed. The disused platforms were demolished in 2006 during the modernisation of the E30 main line (part of which was the Węgliniec–Roßlau railway), which included the electrification and double-tracking of the line.
