= Upper Lusatian Railway Company =

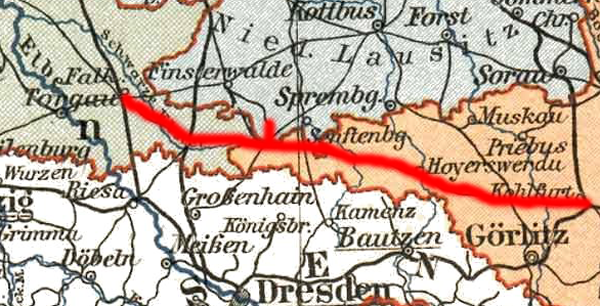
Network of the Upper Lusatian Railway Company

The Upper Lusatian Railway Company (German: Oberlausitzer Eisenbahn-Gesellschaft) is a defunct German railway company. The company, which had its headquarters in Ruhland now in the Oberspreewald-Lausitz district, received a concession on 11 October 1871 for the construction of a railway line, partly to provide a direct connection from Breslau (now Wrocław) to Magdeburg. The 148 km long-route lead west from the rail node of Kohlfurt (now Węgliniec, Poland) through Upper Lusatia via Horka, Hoyerswerda, Ruhland and Elsterwerda-Biehla to Falkenberg in the Lower Lusatia.

The Węgliniec–Falkenberg/Elster railway was inaugurated on 1 June 1874 under its first director, Karl Eduard Zachariae von Lingenthal, who headed it until 1876. In 1878, the management of the line was taken over by the Berlin-Anhalt Railway Company (Berlin-Anhaltische Eisenbahn-Gesellschaft), which allowed it to round out its network. In the same year the Upper Lusatian Railway Company assigned the management of its second line, the Ruhland–Lauchhammer (Ost) railway, which was opened on 15 October 1875 and was only eight kilometres long, to the Cottbus-Großenhain Railway Company.

Both operators were nationalised and became part over the Prussian state railways from 1 May 1882. Exactly five years later, on 1 May 1887, the Upper Lusatian Railway Company sold its tracks to the state and was wound up.
