= Bielawa Dolna =

Village in south-western Poland

- Village
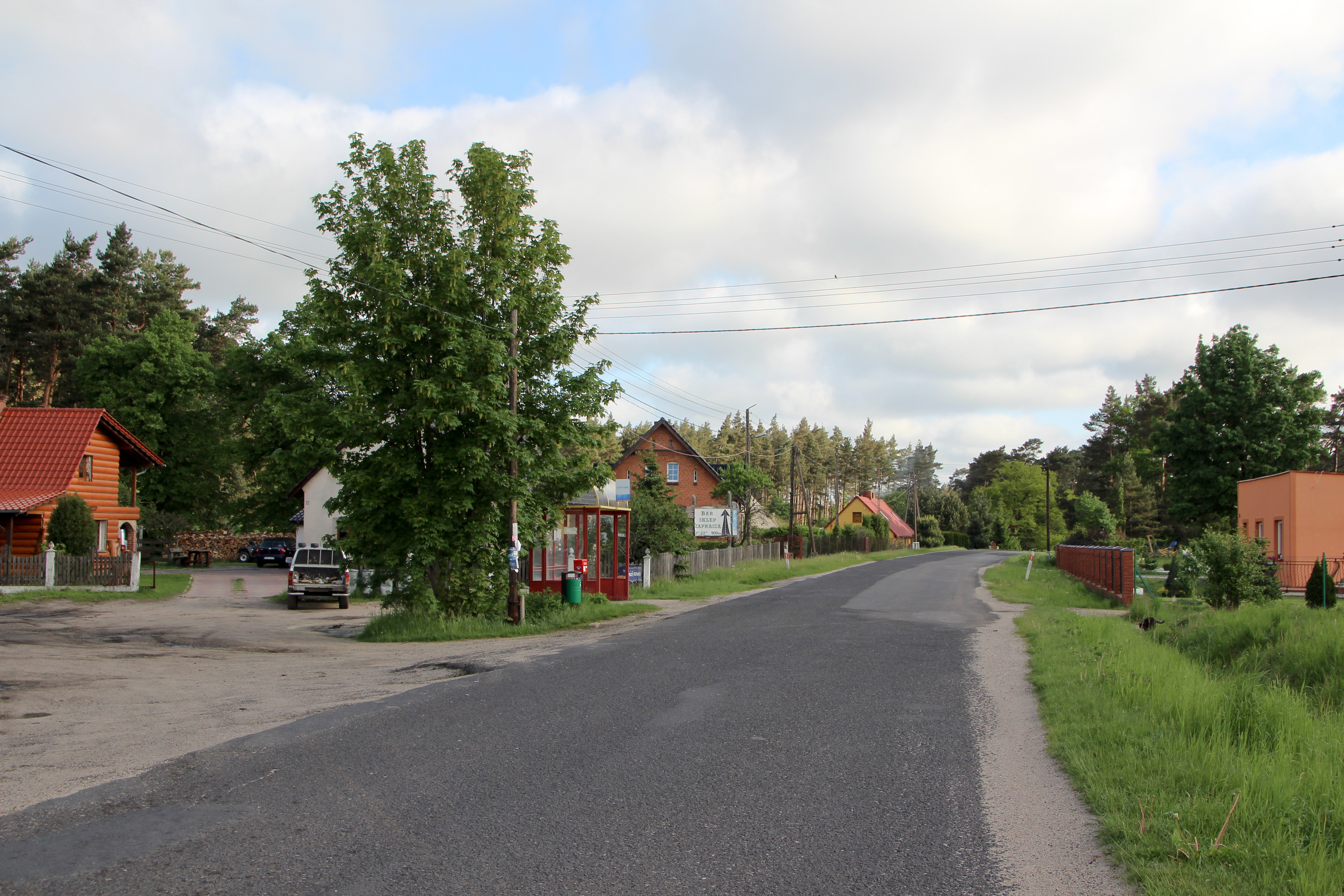

- Location within Poland
- Coordinates: 51°18′N 15°2′E
- Country: Poland
- Voivodeship: Lower Silesian
- County: Zgorzelec
- Gmina: Pieńsk

Population
  - Total: 298
- Time zone: UTC+1 (CET)
  - Summer (DST): UTC+2 (CEST)
- Vehicle registration: DZG

Bielawa Dolna [bjɛˈlava ˈdɔlna] is a village in the administrative district of Gmina Pieńsk, within Zgorzelec County, Lower Silesian Voivodeship, in south-western Poland, on the border with Germany.

Until 1949, Bielawa Dolna was served by Bielawa Dolna railway station.
