= Cottbus-Großenhain Railway Company =

Railway company in Prussia

The Cottbus-Großenhain Railway Company (German: Cottbus-Großenhainer Eisenbahn-Gesellschaft, CGE) was a railway company in Prussia. It owned rail links between Großenhain, Cottbus and Frankfurt (Oder).

== History ==
It was founded in 1868, with the Leipzig–Dresden Railway Company (Leipzig-Dresdner Eisenbahn-Compagnie) holding a third of the capital, as it had hoped for additional traffic as a result of the construction of the new line. They also took over its management when the 80 km long Cottbus–Senftenberg–Großenhain line opened on 20 April 1870. The first Director of the CGE until 1876 was Karl Eduard Zachariae von Lingenthal. The company was based in Cottbus.

The 71 km long extension of the main line to the northeast of Cottbus via Grunow to Frankfurt (Oder) was opened to traffic on 31 December 1876.

From 1 June 1874. the CGE decided—at the request of the Prussian government—to operate its own line, as well as the newly opened Upper Lusatian Railway Company (Oberlausitzer Eisenbahn-Gesellschaf). From 1 July 1878 it also managed the Ruhland–Lauchhammer (Ost) branch line.

Since the traffic of the CGE was well developed, the Prussian government decided to acquire the company. It took over the administration and operation of the railway on 1 May 1882 and ownership on 1 September 1883. The CGE was dissolved.

== Lines ==
- Großenhain–Cottbus
- Cottbus–Frankfurt (Oder)
