= Görlitz station =

Railway station in Saxony, Germany

Görlitz
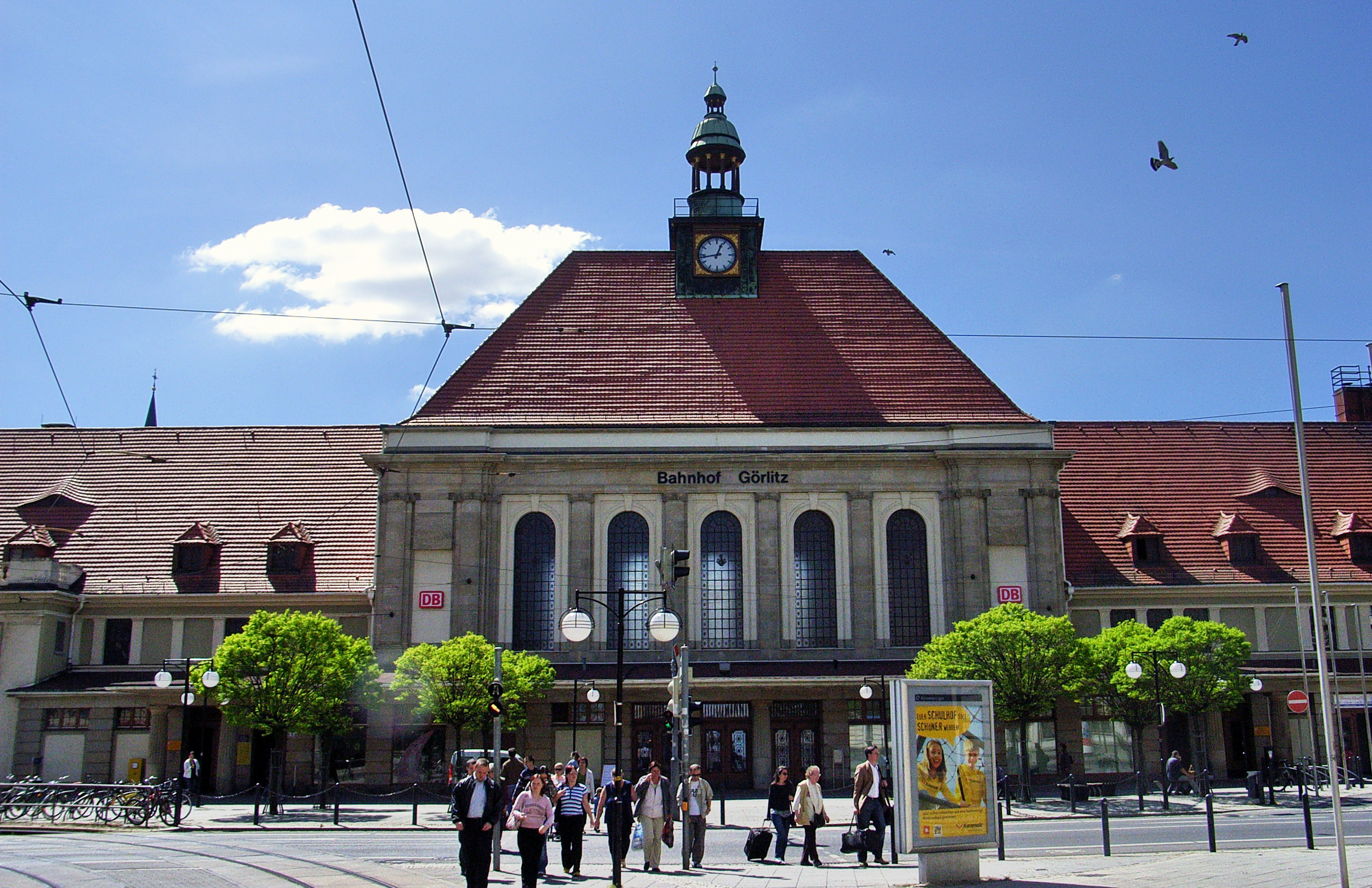
- Station building and forecourt

General information
- Location: Bahnhofstr. 76, Görlitz, Saxony; Germany
- Coordinates: 51°8′50″N 14°58′45″E
- Lines: Berlin–Görlitz (KBS 220); Görlitz–Dresden (KBS 230); Görlitz–Weißenberg/OL. (closed); Węgliniec–Zgorzelec–Görlitz; Görlitz–Jelenia Góra; Görlitz–Zawidów
- Platforms: 6

Construction
- Accessible: Yes (except platforms 9 and 10)
- Architect: Gustav Kießler
- Architectural style: Jugendstil

Other information
- Station code: 2194
- DS100 code: DG
- IBNR: 8010131
- Category: 3
- Website: www.bahnhof.de

History
- Opened: 1 September 1847; 179 years ago
- Electrified: 1923–1945

Services
Preceding station	Trilex	Following station
Löbau (Sachs) towards Dresden Hbf	RE 1	Zgorzelec Terminus
Görlitz-Rauschwalde towards Dresden Hbf	RB 60	Terminus
Preceding station	Ostdeutsche Eisenbahn	Following station
Kodersdorf towards Hoyerswerda	RB 64	Terminus
Kodersdorf towards Cottbus Hbf	RB 65	Görlitz-Weinhübel towards Zittau
Preceding station	KD	Following station
Zgorzelec towards Wrocław Główny	D10	Dresden Hauptbahnhof Terminus
Zgorzelec towards Świeradów-Zdrój or Karpacz	D62	Terminus
Preceding station	Polregio	Following station
Terminus	PR	Zgorzelec towards Zielona Góra Główna
Location

Görlitz station is the central station of the city of Görlitz in the German state of Saxony. Of the original twelve station tracks only six are still in operation. Görlitz is also served by stations in Rauschwalde, Weinhübel and Hagenwerder.

== History ==
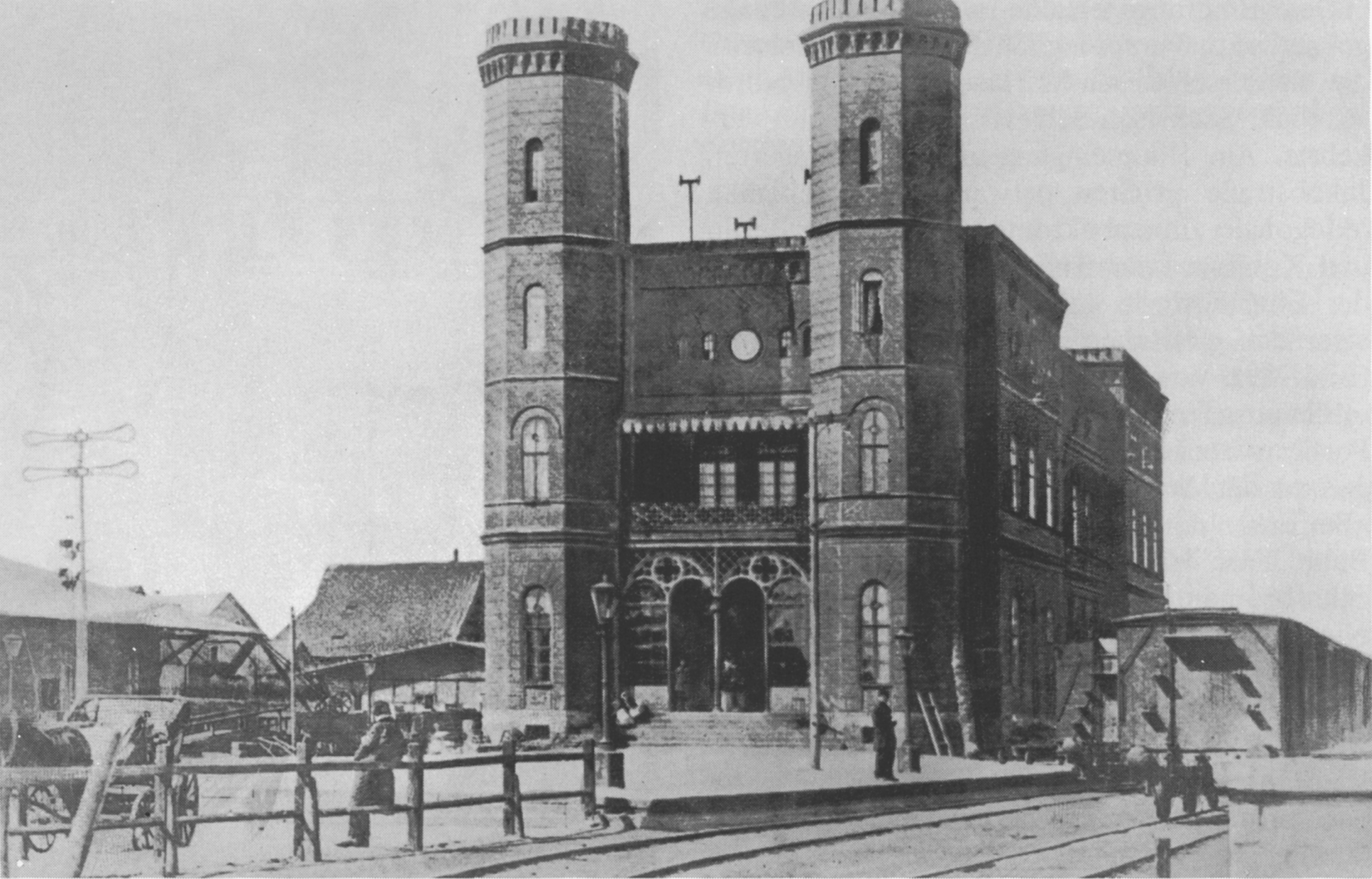
Original station in 1860

In 1845, the city began, along with the Lower Silesian-Marcher Railway (German: Niederschlesisch-Märkische Eisenbahn), the construction of a station building, which opened in 1847 and began the development of modern Görlitz. Hotels, apartments and businesses were later built around the station. Previously, it had been surrounded only by fields. The station was built by the master mason, Gustav Kießler, who also built the Neisse Viaduct.

On 15 October 1846 Görlitz was connected to the railway network in Prussian Silesia, of which Görlitz formed part at that time. The Lower Silesian-Marcher Railway had begun to build its line from Berlin to Breslau in 1843. A branch of this line ran from Kohlfurt (after 1945 renamed as Węgliniec) to Görlitz. The South-North German Connecting Railway (Süd-Norddeutsche Verbindungsbahn) was already planning a connection between Berlin and Vienna via Görlitz and Seidenberg (renamed after 1945 as Zawidów).

The station of Görlitz, which Prussia had seized from Saxony in 1815, was jointly operated by the Lower Silesian-Marcher Railway and the Saxon-Silesian Railway, railway companies based in the two mentioned nations. The Saxon-Silesian Railway operated the line to Dresden. The city created Bahnhofsstraße as a street access to the station. The first station building was built on island platforms, so that the two railway companies could have separate entrances.

Two slender towers were built at the main entrance, which was protected from the weather by a veranda. From the entrance hall a passage connected to the ticket and luggage offices. This hall was connected by passages to the waiting rooms and trains. A similar building was built by Lower Silesian-Marcher Railway in Kohlfurt.

Görlitz was one of the major cities of Prussia and further extensions were built. A line was built to Berlin via Cottbus, opened in 1867. Traffic grew rapidly and the station became congested. The existing building was built west of the island platforms and a new entrance building was built facing Bahnhofsstrasse. A newly pedestrian tunnel was built leading directly from Bahnhofsstrasse to the extension of the building on the island platforms. All other old railway buildings, including the two towers had to be demolished for the new development. The new building was larger and better equipped than the old station. During the World War I the new building and the adjacent railway post office (1915) were completed. The entrance hall was opened in Art Nouveau style in 1917.

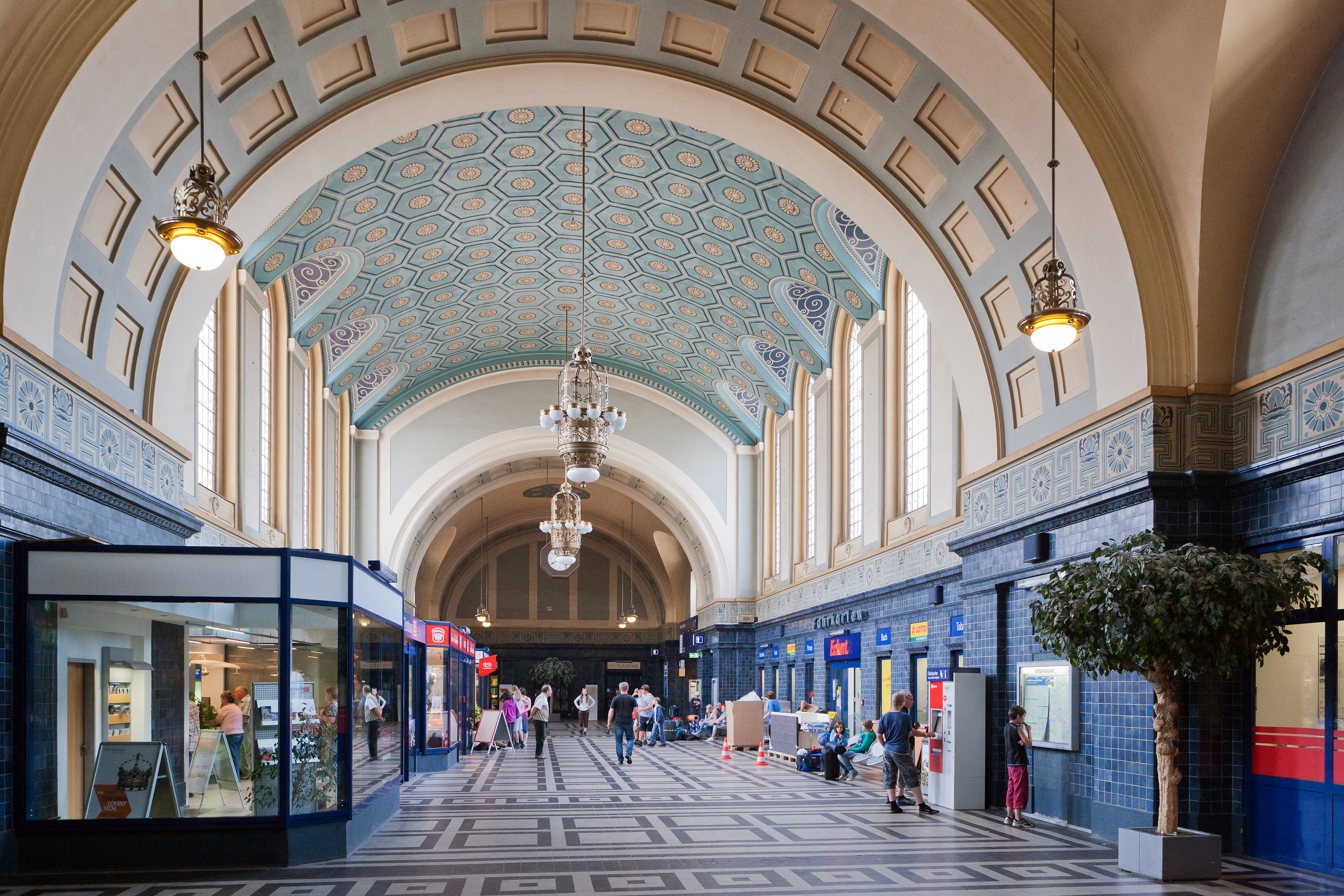
Art Nouveau style entrance hall

In 1923 Görlitz station was electrified and thus connected to electrified rail network on the Silesian Mountain Railway. Electric rail transport in Görlitz ended in February 1945, due to war-related interruption of overhead lines and power supply. Starting in autumn 1945 the overhead lines were dismantled and transported as reparations to the Soviet Union. Scheduled in 1981 Deutsche Reichsbahn planned the reelectrification of the station to be completed by 1995. However, after 1989 (opening of the East German western borders) the reconstruction of inner-German rail connections gained priority and the electrification of the Dresden-Görlitz Saxon-Silesian railway has been deferred indefinitely.

In 1984, the station hall ceiling was completely restored. The building has since become a historical monument.

== Train services ==
In the 2026 timetable the following lines stop at the station:

Line	Route	Frequency
RE 1	(Dresden –) Bischofswerda – Bautzen – Löbau – Görlitz (– Zgorzelec)	60 min
RB 60	(Dresden –) Bischofswerda – Bautzen – Löbau – Görlitz	60 min
RB 64	Görlitz – Niesky – Hoyerswerda	120 min
RB 65	Cottbus – Weißwasser – Görlitz – Zittau	60 min
D62	Görlitz – Zgorzelec – Lubań – Jelenia Góra	120 min
PR	(Zielona Góra – Żary –) Węgliniec – Zgorzelec – Görlitz	5 train pairs
As of 22 February 2026

Görlitz station has border facilities for Poland, but these have not been used since Poland joined the Schengen Area in 2008. Trains used to run three times a day to Legnica and Wrocław from 2009 until 28 February 2015. Cross-border services were restored in December 2015. Since then there are direct trains to Jelenia Góra.

== See also ==
- Rail transport in Germany
- Railway stations in Germany
