= Hoyerswerda station =

Railway station in Hoyerswerda, Germany

Hoyerswerda Wojerecy
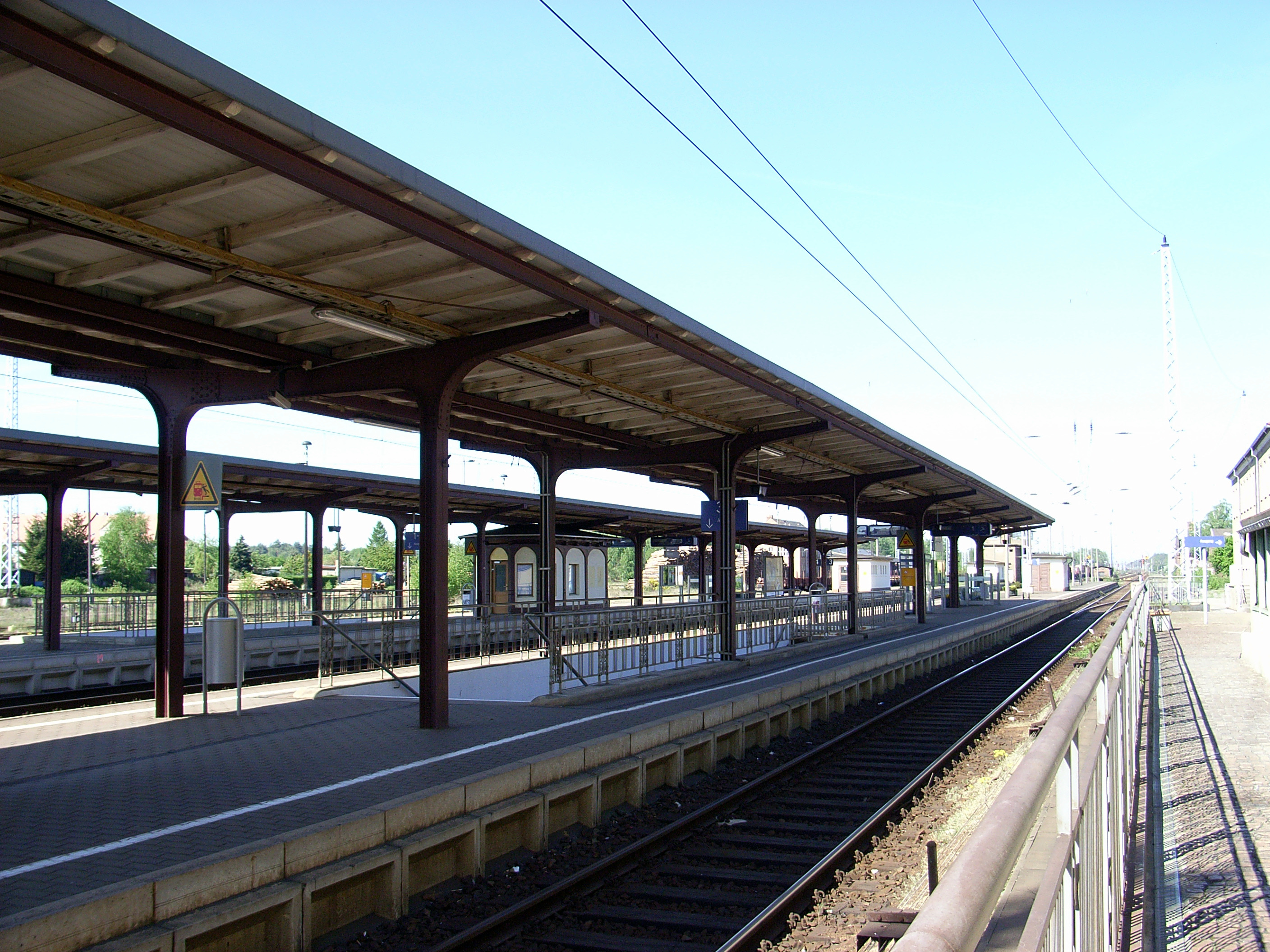
- Hoyerswerda railway station in 2007

General information
- Location: Bahnhofsallee 1, 02977 Hoyerswerda; Germany
- Coordinates: 51°25′59″N 14°13′55″E
- Owner: DB Netz
- Operator: DB Station&Service
- Line: Węgliniec–Roßlau railway
- Platforms: 2
- Tracks: 4

Construction
- Accessible: No

Other information
- Station code: 2931
- DS100 code: BHW
- IBNR: 8010177
- Category: 5
- Fare zone: VVO: 20; : 7969 (VVO transitional tariff)
- Website: www.bahnhof.de

Services
Preceding station	DB Regio Nordost	Following station
Schwarzkollm towards Leipzig Hbf	RE 11	Terminus
Schwarzkollm towards Dresden Hbf	RE 15	Terminus
Preceding station	Ostdeutsche Eisenbahn	Following station
Terminus	RB 64	Hoyerswerda-Neustadt towards Görlitz
Location

Hoyerswerda railway station (German: Bahnhof Hoyerswerda) is a railway station in Hoyerswerda, Germany. The station is located on the Węgliniec–Roßlau line and operated by DB Station&Service.

== Services ==
=== Railway services ===
Train services are currently operated by DB Regio and Ostdeutsche Eisenbahn. In the 2024 timetable the following services stop at Hoyerswerda station:

Line	Route	Frequency (min)	Operator
RE 11	Hoyerswerda – Hosena – Ruhland – Falkenberg (Elster) – Eilenburg – Leipzig	120	DB Regio Nordost
RE 15	Hoyerswerda – Hosena – Ruhland – Großenhain Cottb Bf – Dresden	120	DB Regio Nordost
RB 64	Hoyerswerda – Görlitz	120	Ostdeutsche Eisenbahn

With lines RE 11 and RE 15 there are westward connections from Hoyerswerda to Ruhland every 60 minutes. From Ruhland further trains (lines RB 49 and RE 18) operate, so basically there are connections from Hoyerswerda to both Leipzig and Dresden every 60 minutes.

Line RB 64 connects Hoyerswerda eastward to Niesky and Görlitz.

Since December 2025, there are two pairs of EuroCity-Services from PKP calling at Hoyserswerda; connecting it with Leipzig, Wroclaw, Krakow and Przemysl.

=== Local transport ===
City bus lines 1, 2, 3A and 4 as well as many regional bus lines frequently stop at this station.
