= Węgliniec–Roßlau railway =

Railway line in Germany and Poland

Węgliniec–Roßlau (Elbe) railway
- Węgliniec–Roßlau railway with a short section in Western Poland (red) and a longer section in Southeastern Germany (orange)

Overview
- Line number: 6207 (Germany); 295 (Poland)
- Locale: Germany and Poland

Service
- Route number: 216, 228, 229

Technical
- Line length: 233.2 km (144.9 mi)
- Number of tracks: 2
- Track gauge: 1,435 mm (4 ft 8 1/2 in) standard gauge
- Minimum radius: 470 m (1,542 ft)
- Electrification: Horka–Roßlau: 15 kV/16.7 Hz AC catenary; Węgliniec–Horka: 3 kV DC catenary
- Operating speed: 120 km/h (74.6 mph) (maximum)
- Maximum incline: 0.07%

The Węgliniec–Roßlau (Elbe) railway is a mainline railway in the Polish voivodeship of Lower Silesia and the German states of Saxony, Brandenburg and Saxony-Anhalt, originally built by the Berlin-Anhalt Railway Company and the Upper Lusatian Railway Company as part of the trunk line from Breslau (now Wrocław) to Magdeburg.

It runs from Węgliniec (formerly Kohlfurt) via Niesky, Hoyerswerda, Falkenberg (Elster) and Wittenberg to Roßlau (Elbe). The line is sometimes called the Niederschlesische Gütermagistrale (Lower Silesian freight trunk line) because it provides a direct connection from Lower Silesia to Central Germany. The western section of the line is one of the oldest lines in Germany.

== History ==
The Berlin-Anhalt Railway Company (German: Berlin-Anhaltische Eisenbahn-Gesellschaft; BAE) was one of the major railway companies in Germany for more than four decades during the 19th century. Apart from the Anhalt trunk line, during this period it built a network of important railway connections between Berlin and the northern part of the Kingdom of Saxony, the Prussian province of Saxony and the Duchy of Anhalt, which eventually included a length of approximately 430 kilometres.

=== Planning and construction ===
The Wittenberg–Dessau section was part of the original route of the Anhalt line. Between Dessau and Coswig (Anhalt), the line was opened on 18 August 1841 and the section between Wittenberg and Coswig (Anhalt) followed on 28 August that year. On 10 September 1841, traffic began to run between Berlin and Köthen.

The construction of new routes by the BAE, along with the growth of competing railway networks, forced constant adjustments to rail services to respond to changing demand . After the construction of the direct route from Wittenberg to Bitterfeld, the importance of the Wittenberg–Dessau–Köthen section declined.

The Upper Lusatian Railway Company (Oberlausitzer Eisenbahn-Gesellschaft) opened the line between Kohlfurt and Falkenberg on 1 June 1874. The gap between Falkenberg and Wittenberg was opened by the BAE on 15 October 1875.

The Upper Lusatian Railway Company transferred the management of its section of the route to the BAE in 1878. The line was nationalised on 1 May 1882 and became part of the Prussian State Railways.

=== Second World War ===
On 20 April 1945, there was an air raid on Piesteritz station, which blew up several wagons and also caused significant damage to a nitrogen plant. The explosion was so powerful that the wheels and axles of a tank wagon were hurled 500 metres to the present federal highway 187.

=== After the Second World War ===
After the end of the Second World War, the border was divided by the Oder-Neisse line; the railway node of Kohlfurt became part of Poland and was renamed Węgliniec. The cross-border route has remained of importance for freight, but there was no longer any passenger transport between Horka station and Węgliniec station after 1945. In 1946, the second track on sections of the line was dismantled. In 1949, Bielawa Dolna railway station closed.

The stations lying in area where the Sorbian language is spoken received additional signs in the Sorbian language. These names were now also listed in the timetable of Deutsche Reichsbahn.

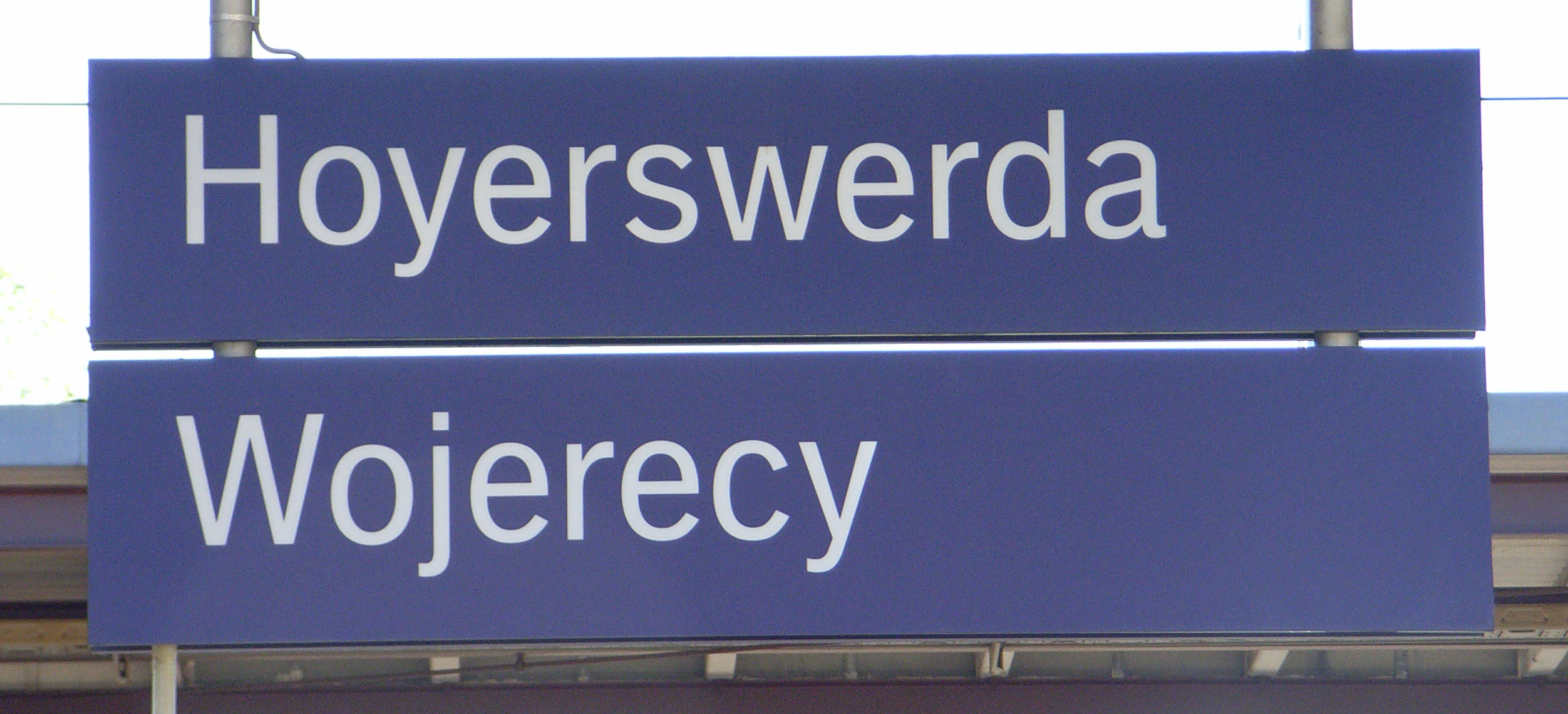
A bilingual station sign at Hoyerswerda

Station names in the Sorbian language area
German	Sorbian
Niesky	Niska
Mücka	Mikow
Klitten	Klětno
Uhyst	Delni Wujězd
Lohsa	Łaz
Knappenrode	Hórnikecy
Hoyerswerda-Neustadt	Wojerecy-Nowe město
Hoyerswerda	Wojerecy
Schwarzkollm	Čorny Chołmc

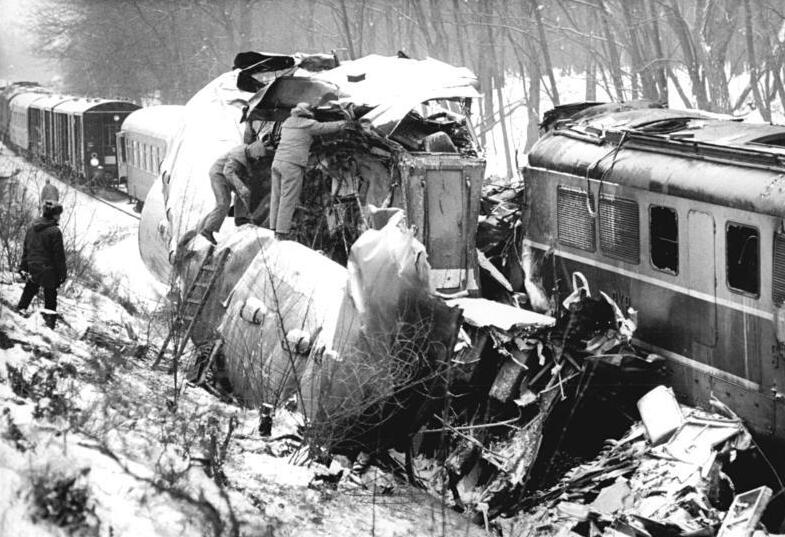
Clearance work at the accident site on 3 December 1988

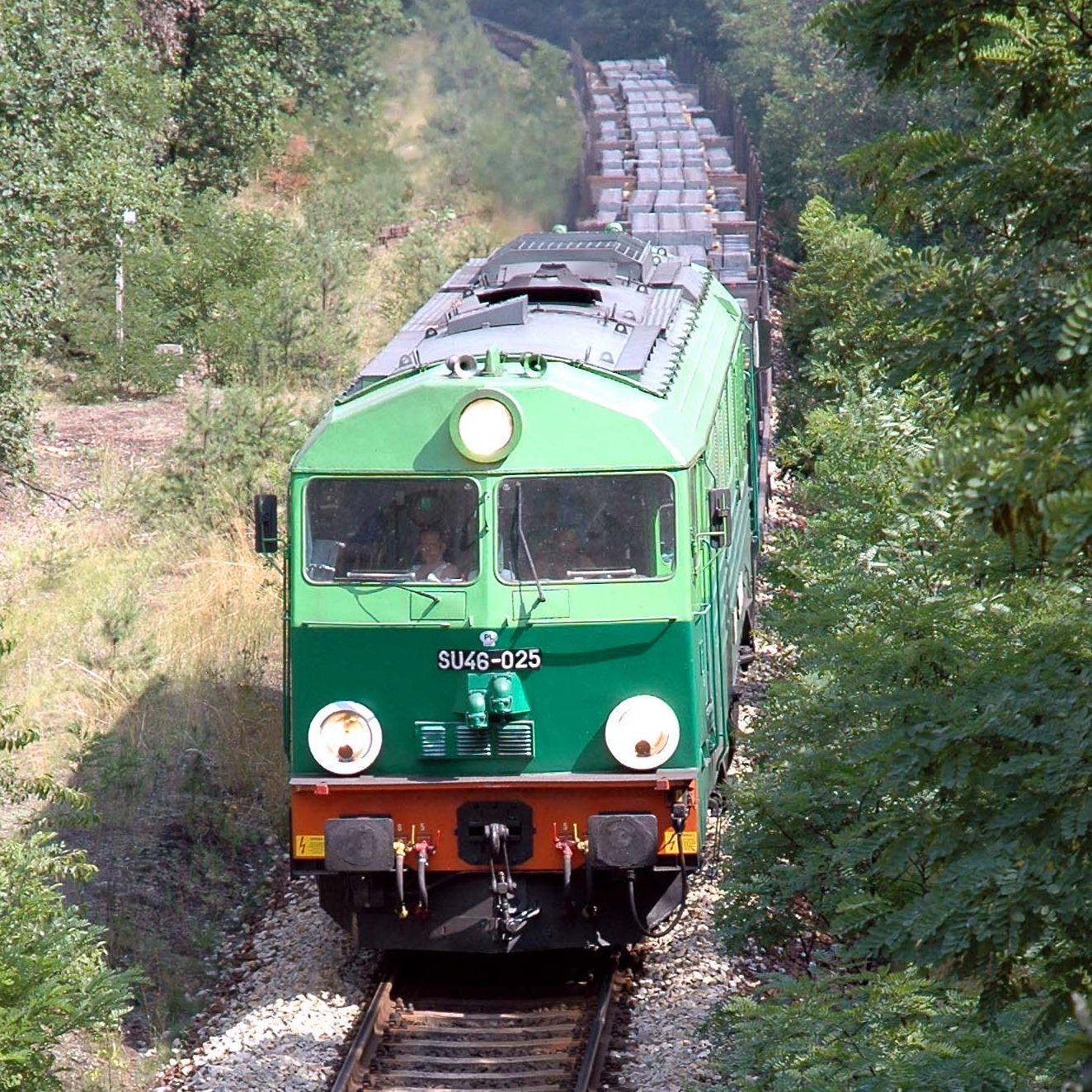
Freight train with PKP SU46 near Horka (2004)

In the early 1960s, the line was realigned between Uhyst and Lohsa because of the expansion of the Lohsa open cut mine. The new line was opened on 11 January 1962.

The line between Knappenrode and Falkenberg/Elster was electrified in the 1980s to serve the heavy coal traffic. Electric rail operations began between Hohenbocka and Ruhland and between Knappenrode and Hohenbocka on 19 December 1987 and on 1 April 1988. There was a collision of a Polish freight train and a Deutsche Reichsbahn train on 3 December 1988, close to the state border between the stations of Horka, East Germany, and Bielawa Dolna, Poland. Here, five German and three Polish railway workers were killed and three other railway workers were seriously injured.

Passenger services between Horka and Niesky had always been of minor importance only and the last class 771 railbus ran on 14 December 2002, after a rail replacement bus service had already been operated for a few weeks.

Extensive renovation has been carried out since 2009, including a major renovation of the track and overhead wires equipment from the Roßlau/Dessau railway transport hub. As part of this project, the modernisation of the railway stations of Roßlau, Coswig, Wittenberg-Piesteritz and Wittenberg-West is planned during the next few years.

In 2010, a regular service ran again between Horka and Hoyerswerda, hauled by a class 50 steam locomotive.

The Klitten–Hoyerswerda section has been blocked since 12 December 2010, while the Lausitzer und Mitteldeutsche Bergbau-Verwaltungsgesellschaft (Lusatian and Central German Mining Administration Company, LMBV) re-inforces the eastern embankment of the Silbersee (Silver Lake) in the area around Lohsa station. During the stabilisation work there is an increased risk, so that the line, which runs directly along the eastern shore, cannot currently be used. Freight trains are rerouted via Weißwasser, Knappenrode, Spremberg and Cottbus. In passenger traffic, the Görlitz–Niesky–Hoyerswerda service, which is operated by Ostdeutsche Eisenbahn (ODEG), runs only to Horka; between Horka and Hoyerswerda additional buses run as a rail replacement service. The end of the stabilisation work has been delayed from late 2012 to 2014, after a 200 metre long section of the bank slipped on 8 March 2012 during the remedial work.

=== Route development between the Polish border and Knappenrode ===
Because of the ever increasing volumes of freight traffic, the full doubling and electrification of the line was agreed on the section between the Polish border and Knappenrode in December 2001. A project with this objective, along with a planned maximum speed of 120 km/h, was included in the Bundesverkehrswegeplan (Federal Transport Infrastructure Plan) of 2003 and included in the Bedarfsplan Schiene (“rail demand plan”, which was added as an annex to the Federal Railway Infrastructure Expansion Act).

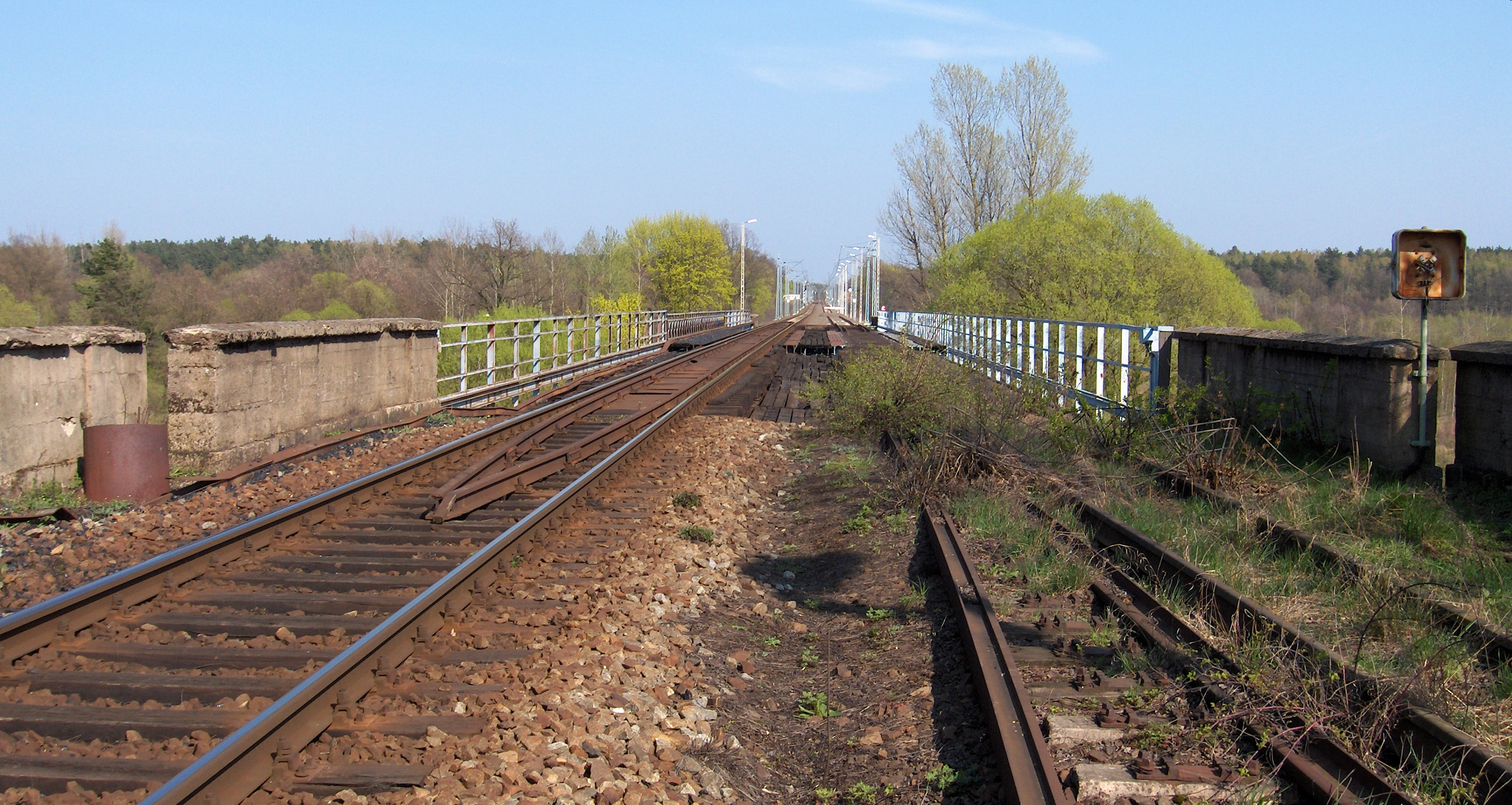
Neiße bridge, looking east; the route in Poland has been already upgraded and electrified (2009)

The planning approval process for the 52 kilometre commenced in 2009. In the spring of 2012, the necessary funding agreement to develop the line was signed between the federal government and Deutsche Bahn. The construction was scheduled to start in early September 2012 with the rebuilding of Knappenrode station and doubling of the line would start at the end 2013 and was planned to be completed by the end of 2016. The total investment would be about €420 million. The stations of Lohsa, Uhyst, Klitten, Mücka and Petershain are to be rebuilt with two platforms and at Niesky station two new platforms and a pedestrian tunnel will also be built. Five electronic interlocking systems are to be built and the route across the border will be equipped with European Train Control System. Noise barriers are to be installed on 16 kilometres of the line.

Work on route development began with the renovation of Knappenrode station in 2012. The new overhead line in the station was energised on 1 October. With the commissioning of a new electronic interlocking system at the station, the renovation is to be completed in the spring of 2014. A synchronous converter has been under construction in Lohsa and a transformer in Ruhland for the traction power supply since the spring of 2013. The Federal Railway Authority gave planning approval for the Horka freight yard–German/Polish border section in August 2013. The construction work on this section will begin in March 2014 and is expected to last two years.

Funding is provided by the Federal Republic of Germany under the Federal Railway Expansion Act (Bundesschienenwegeausbaugesetz) with co-financing by the European Union. On 7 June 2012, a financing agreement was signed between the Free State of Saxony and Deutsche Bahn, using state funds of €1.6 million and in accordance with relevant provisions in the state’s development plan, to increase the line speed on the Horka–Niesky–Knappenrode section to 160 km/h from the current 120 km/h in order to attract patronage for passenger transport services.

At the same time the Neisse bridge will also be rebuilt by the Polish State Railways. Due to the upgrading measures, the line capacity will be increased from 50 to 180 trains (of which 160 are freight trains) per day.

The line upgrade on the Polish section from Węgliniec to the Neisse bridge was completed on 23 March 2006. Both the newly built second track and the electric catenary end on the bridge. The German section of the development work began in December 2012 with the renovation of the superstructure and the conversion of the overhead line by Deutsche Bahn construction on the line between Knappenrode and Spreewitz (the remaining part of the Knappenrode–Sornoer Buden mining railway). From mid-2013, electrically operated trains could run to Spreewitz again. The upgrade will restore four of the seven tracks and two sidings in Knappenrode station.

The completion of the upgrade will be delayed to 2016 due to problems with the embankment of the Silbersee.

== Operations ==
=== Passengers ===
Currently, this route is served by DB Regio Regionalbahn trains running between Dessau and Falkenberg. The trains take around 80 minutes to cover the approximately 91 km long line and run hourly. In the peak hour additional services run on the line between Dessau Hbf and Lutherstadt Wittenberg and serve only some of the stations. Since the timetable change in December 2011, some services end in Lutherstadt Wittenberg or Annaburg due to low demand. Services are provided by push-pull trains consisting of Class 143 locomotives and at least two double-deck coaches, including a double-deck driving coach.

Services have been operated since 15 December 2013 between Falkenberg (Elster) and Hoyerswerda on the new S-Bahn line S4 of the Mitteldeutschland S-Bahn with Bombardier Talent 2 railcars at two-hour intervals. In addition, Regionalbahn trains to Cottbus operate between Falkenberg and Ruhland and Regional-Express trains to Dresden operate between Ruhland and Hoyerswerda, which connect with each other in Ruhland and thus provide a nearly hourly service of the section from Falkenberg to Hoyerswerda.

=== Freight traffic ===
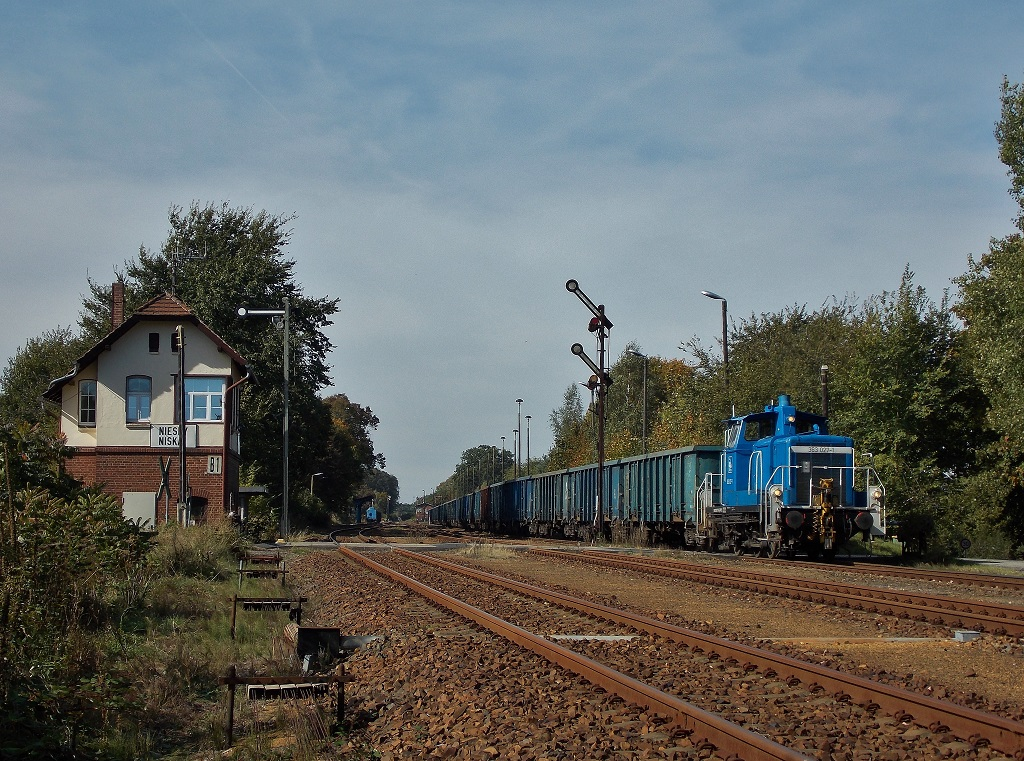
Freight train in Niesky station (2013)

The line is also important for freight transport. That line carries frequent services to the Piesteritz nitrogen works (Stickstoffwerke Piesteritz) in Wittenberg, using an extensive network of freight rail facilities.

In addition, the line is being developed to play an important role in international freight services to Poland. Once construction work is completed, it is one of the most important corridors for freight between Eastern and Western Europe.

In the spring of 2011, the siding the PCI Augsburg company was reactivated with new track and the old track was dismantled. The siding is at the western end of the freight depot of the Stickstoffwerke Piesteritz Piesteritz works.

== Stations ==
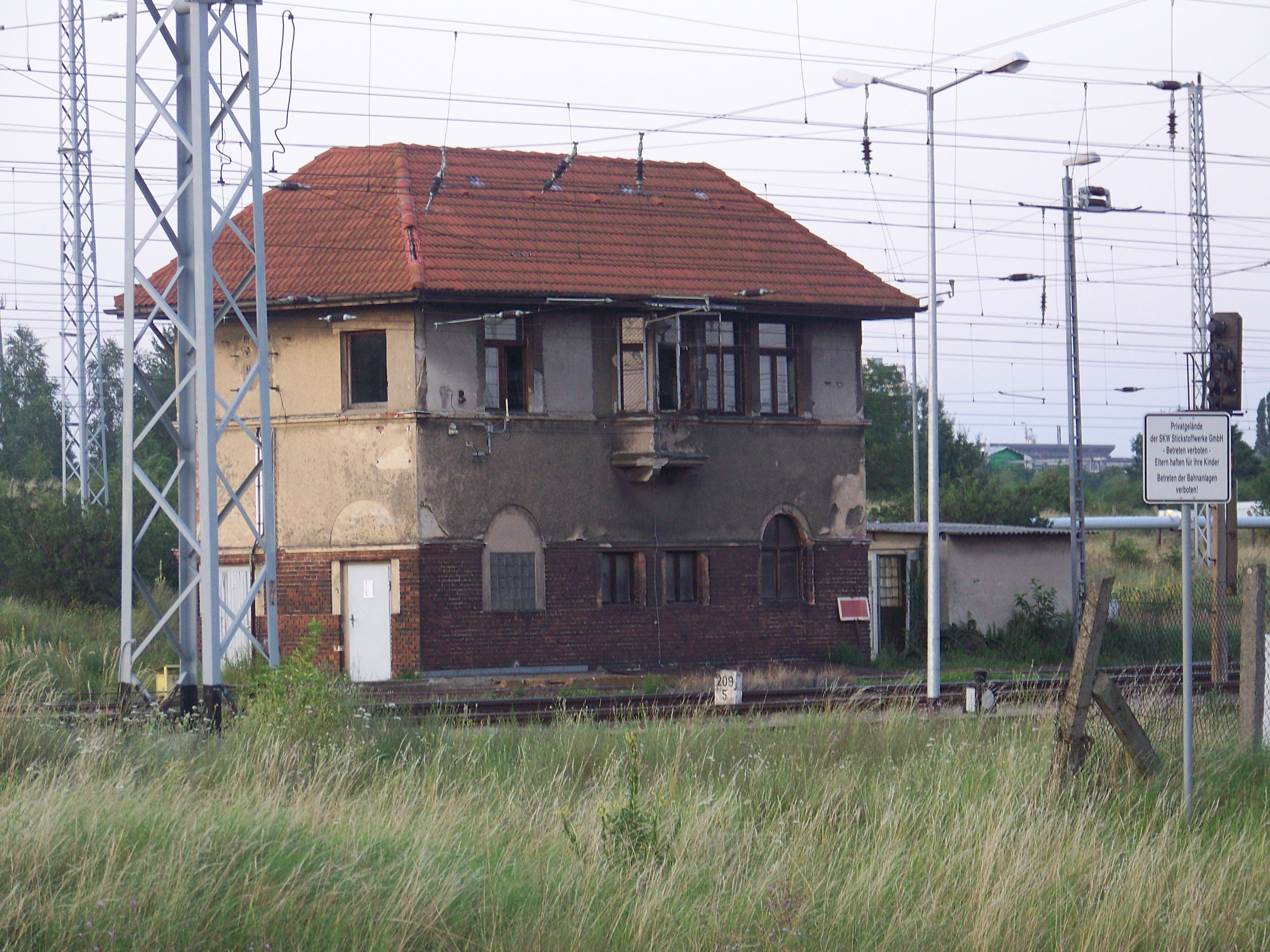
Signal box near Piesteritz

- Horka Gbf (freight yard) is the easternmost freight yard on the German part of the line. To the west is Horka Pbf (passenger station), but it no longer has any platforms on the line and is not served by passenger services.
- Lutherstadt Wittenberg-Piesteritz station is located within the facilities of the nitrogen factory and had an important role in peak hours during the existence of East Germany because up to 9,000 people were employed in the nitrogen works. At present, this station is of minor importance for the residents of Piesteritz, since Wittenberg West station is better located. However, it still has significant traffic for students attending the Berufsbildungszentrum Elbe (Elbe training school).
- The Falkenberg (Elster) station is on two intersecting levels. On the top level is the platform for the DB Regio Regional-Express hourly service between Hoyerswerda or Cottbus and Leipzig. On the lower level is the platform for trains on the Dessau-Falkenberg line. Regional-Express line 5 services supported by the VBB on the Stralsund–Berlin–Falkenberg route, operated by DB Regio on the Jüterbog–Röderau line, terminate in Falkenberg. Until 2004, Regionalbahn trains continued to Riesa.
- The old Wittenberg Station of 1841 is one of the oldest station buildings in Germany and was originally located in the Anhalt trunk line, between the present Wittenberg-West and Wittenberg-Altstadt stations.
