= Kunersdorf station =

Railway station in Germany

Kunersdorf Kosobuz
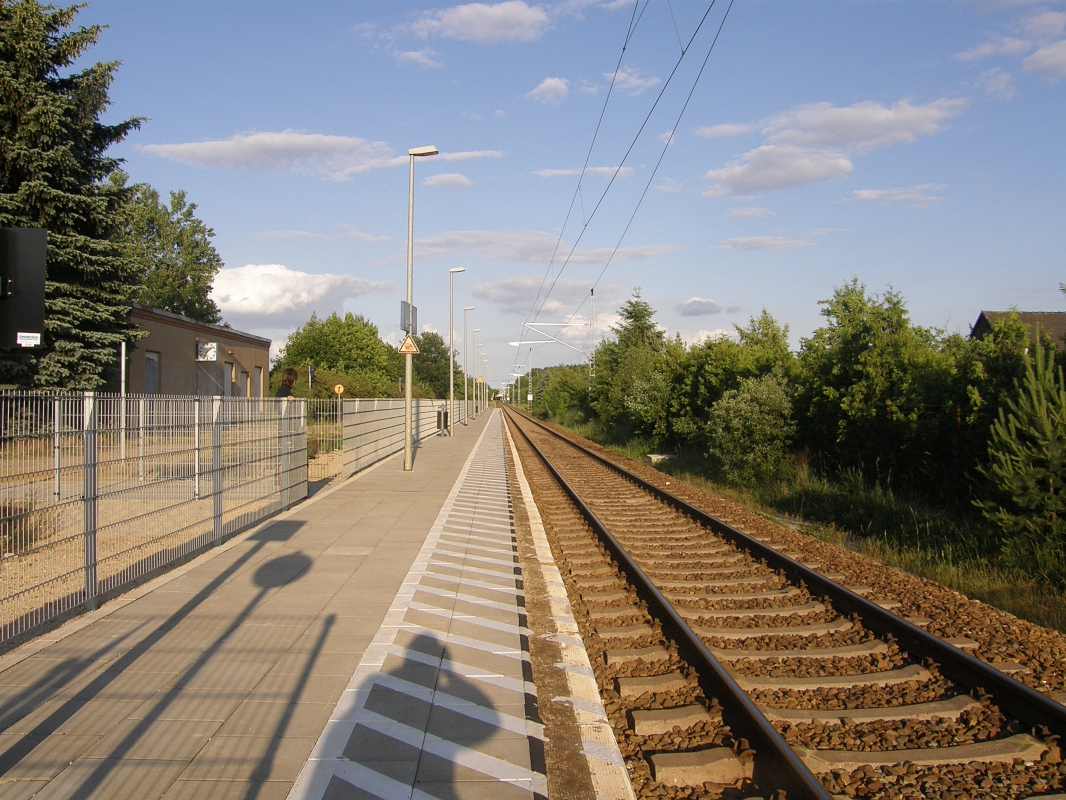
- Station platform in 2009

General information
- Location: Am Bahnhof 15; 03099 Kolkwitz; Brandenburg; Germany
- Coordinates: 51°46′07″N 14°11′19″E
- Owner: DB Netz
- Operator: DB Station&Service
- Lines: Berlin–Görlitz railway (KBS 202)
- Platforms: 1 side platform
- Tracks: 1
- Train operators: Ostdeutsche Eisenbahn

Other information
- Station code: 4861
- DS100 code: BPA
- IBNR: 8012605
- Category: 6
- Fare zone: VBB: Cottbus C/7168
- Website: www.bahnhof.de

History
- Opened: before 1914

Services
Preceding station	Ostdeutsche Eisenbahn	Following station
Vetschau towards Nauen	RE 2 selected trains only	Kolkwitz towards Cottbus Hbf
Location
- Location within Brandenburg

Kunersdorf/Kosobuz (German: Bahnhof Kunersdorf; Lower Sorbian: Dwórnišćo Kosobuz) is a railway station in the Kunersdorf district of the municipality of Kolkwitz, located in the Spree-Neiße district in Brandenburg, Germany.

== Images ==
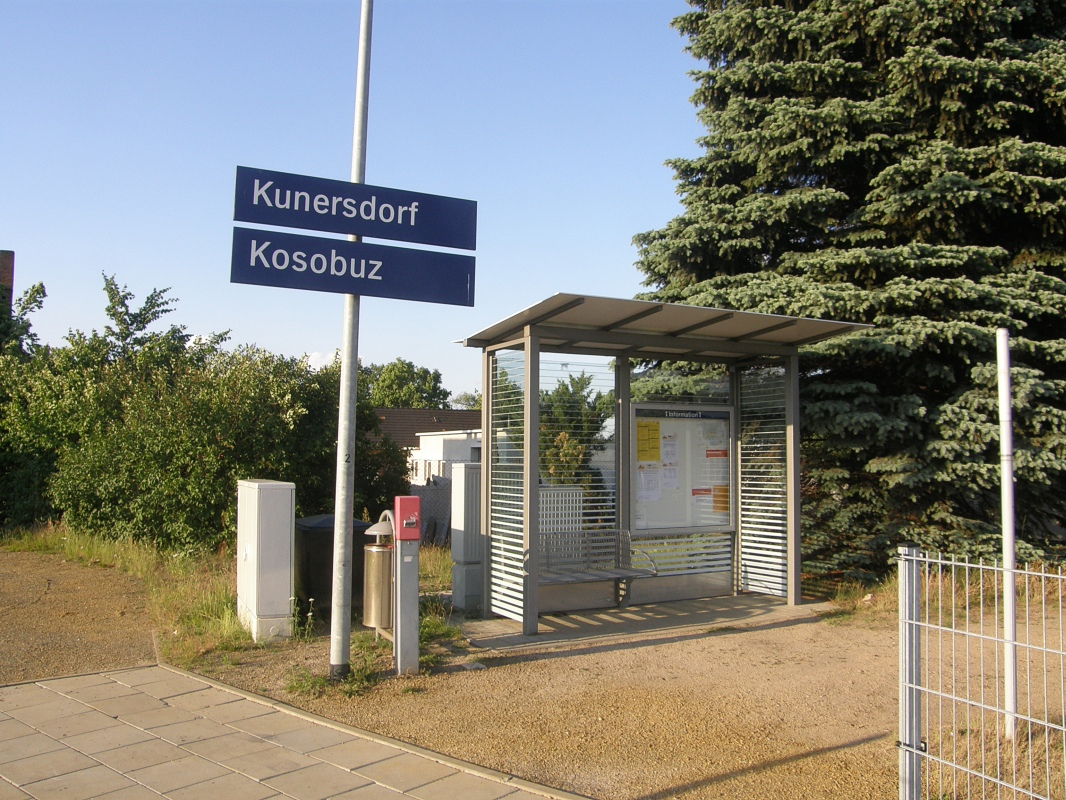
Station waiting area, 2010

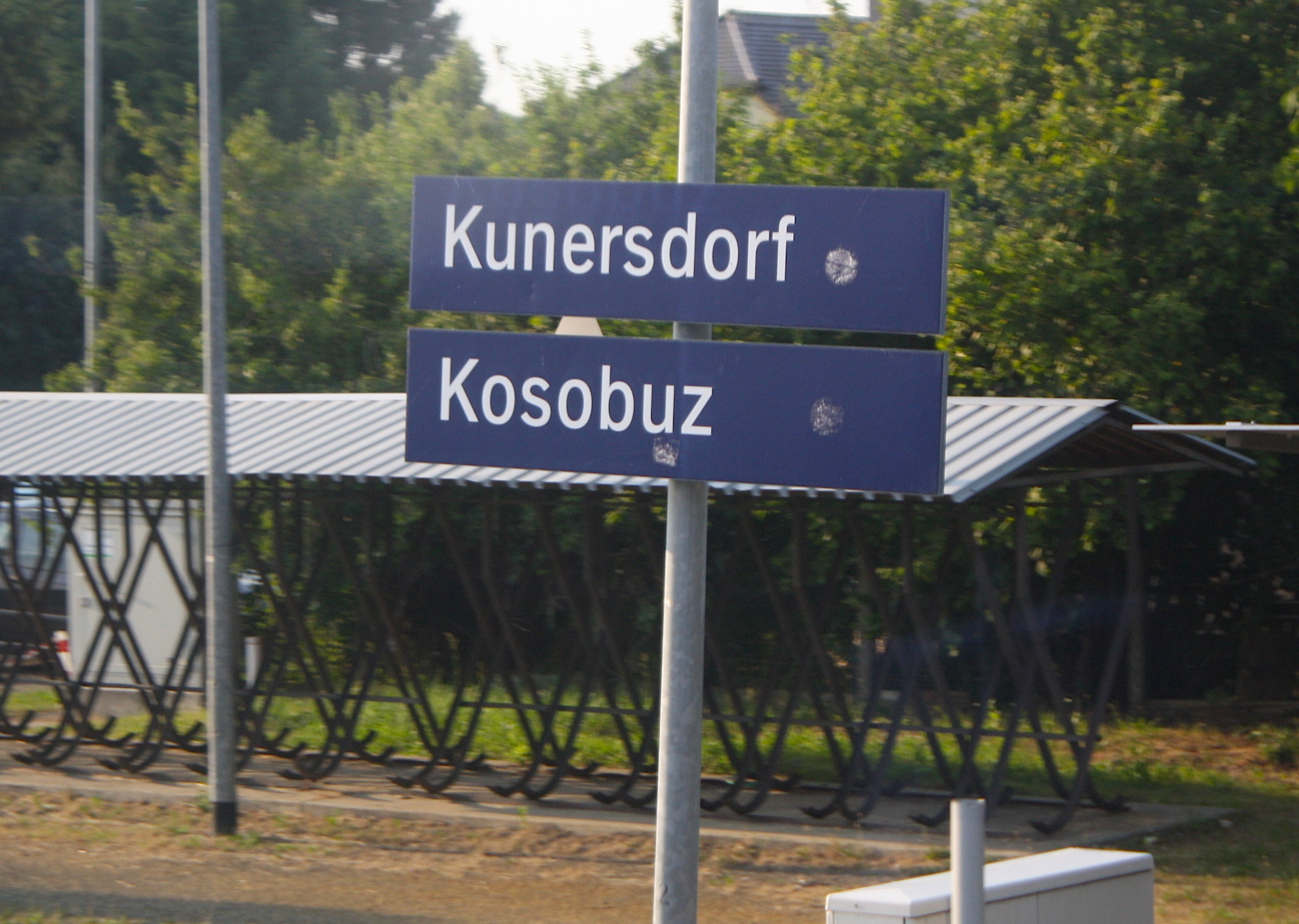
Bilingual sign in German and Lower Sorbian, 2015
