= Brand Tropical Islands station =

Train station in Brandenburg, Germany

Brand Tropical Islands
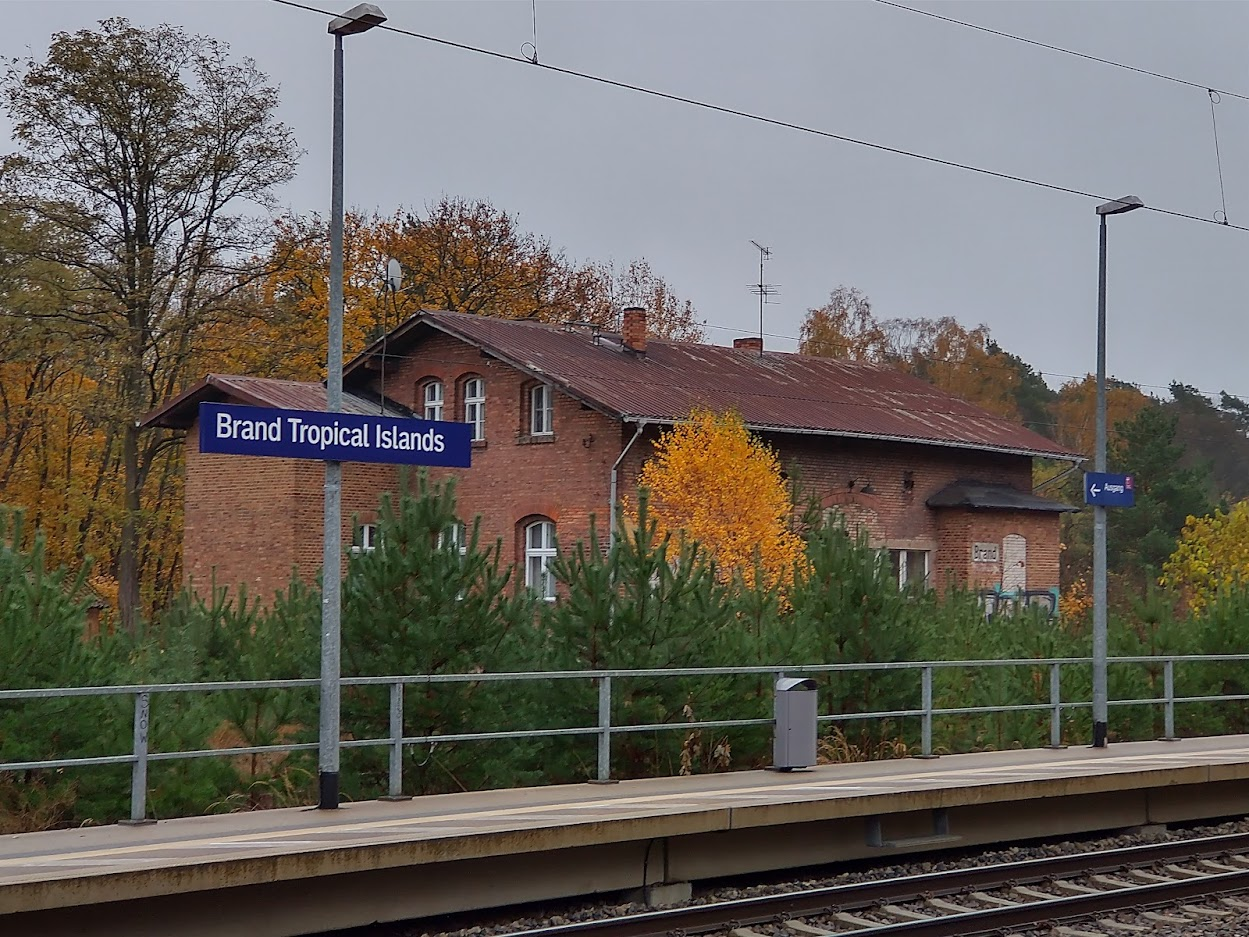

General information
- Location: Am Bahnhof 51; 15757 Halbe OT Brand; Brandenburg; Germany
- Coordinates: 52.0299°N 13.7213°E
- Owner: Deutsche Bahn
- Operator: DB Station&Service
- Lines: Berlin–Görlitz railway (KBS 202)
- Platforms: 2 side platforms
- Tracks: 3
- Train operators: DB Regio Nordost; ODEG
- Connections: RE 2; RE 7

Construction
- Parking: yes
- Cycle facilities: yes
- Accessible: yes

Other information
- Station code: 820
- DS100 code: BBRA
- IBNR: 8011250
- Category: 6
- Fare zone: VBB: 6661
- Website: www.bahnhof.de

Services
Preceding station	Ostdeutsche Eisenbahn	Following station
Königs Wusterhausen towards Nauen	RE 2	Lübben (Spreewald) towards Cottbus Hbf
Preceding station	DB Regio Nordost	Following station
Oderin towards Dessau Hbf	RE 7	Schönwalde (Spreewald) towards Senftenberg
Location

Brand Tropical Islands station is a railway station in the municipality of Halbe, located in the Dahme-Spreewald district in Brandenburg, Germany.

== Notable places nearby ==
- Brand-Briesen Airfield
- Tropical Islands Resort
