= Raddusch station =

Railway station in Germany

Raddusch Raduš
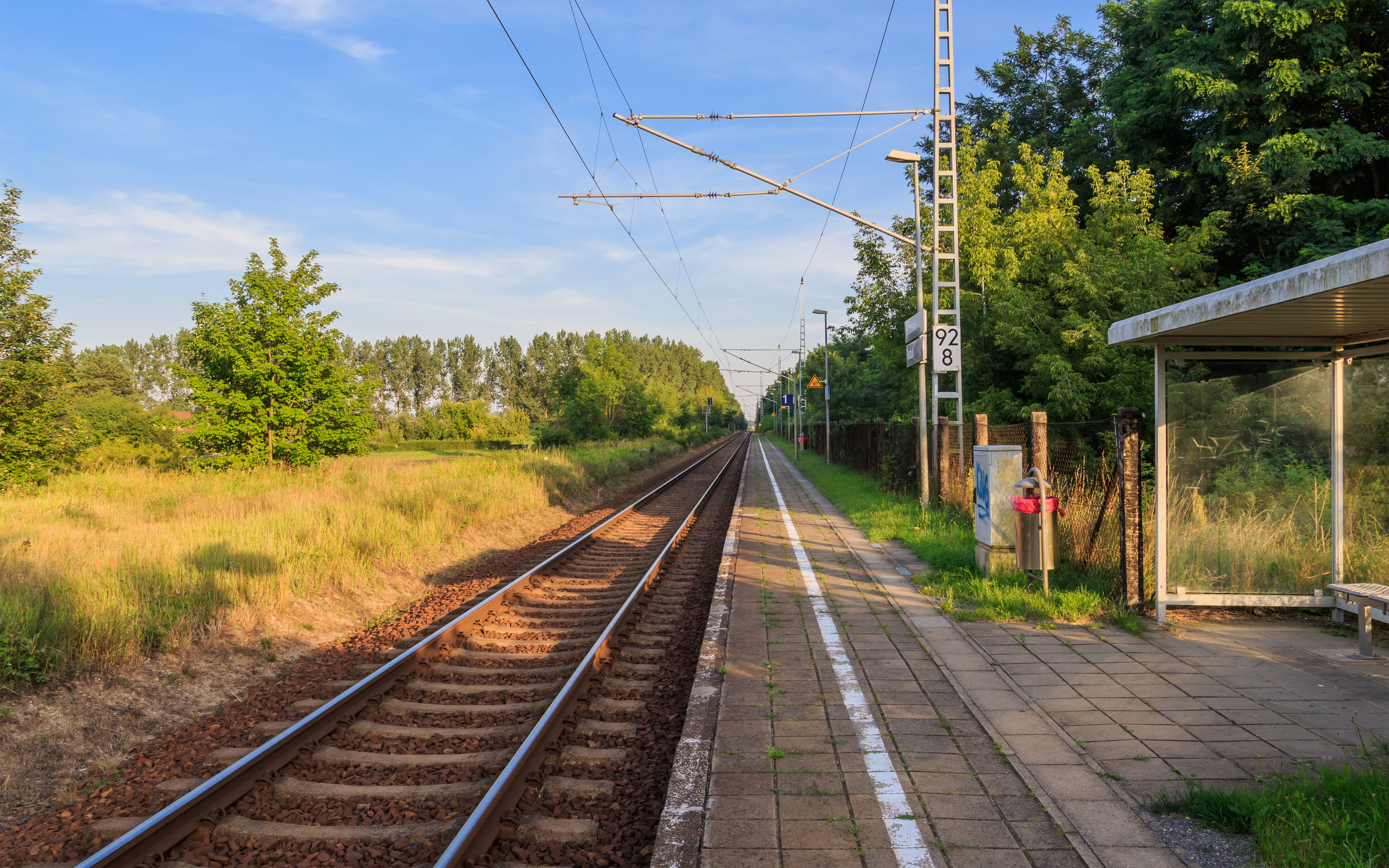
- Station in 2017

General information
- Location: Radduscher Bahnhofstraße/Am Bahndamm; 03226 Vetschau; Brandenburg; Germany
- Coordinates: 51°48′57″N 14°01′56″E
- Owner: DB Netz
- Operator: DB Station&Service
- Lines: Berlin–Görlitz railway (KBS 202)
- Platforms: 1 side platform
- Tracks: 1
- Train operators: Ostdeutsche Eisenbahn

Other information
- Station code: 5082
- DS100 code: BRAD
- IBNR: 8012698
- Category: 6
- Fare zone: VBB: 7165
- Website: www.bahnhof.de

History
- Opened: before 1914

Services
| Preceding station | Ostdeutsche Eisenbahn | Following station |
|---|---|---|
| Lübbenau (Spreewald) towards Nauen | RE 2 selected trains only | Vetschau towards Cottbus Hbf |
Location
- Location within Brandenburg

Raddusch/Raduš (German: Bahnhof Raddusch; Lower Sorbian: Dwórnišćo Raduš) is a railway station in the Raddusch district in the municipality of Vetschau, located in the Oberspreewald-Lausitz district in Brandenburg, Germany.

== Images ==
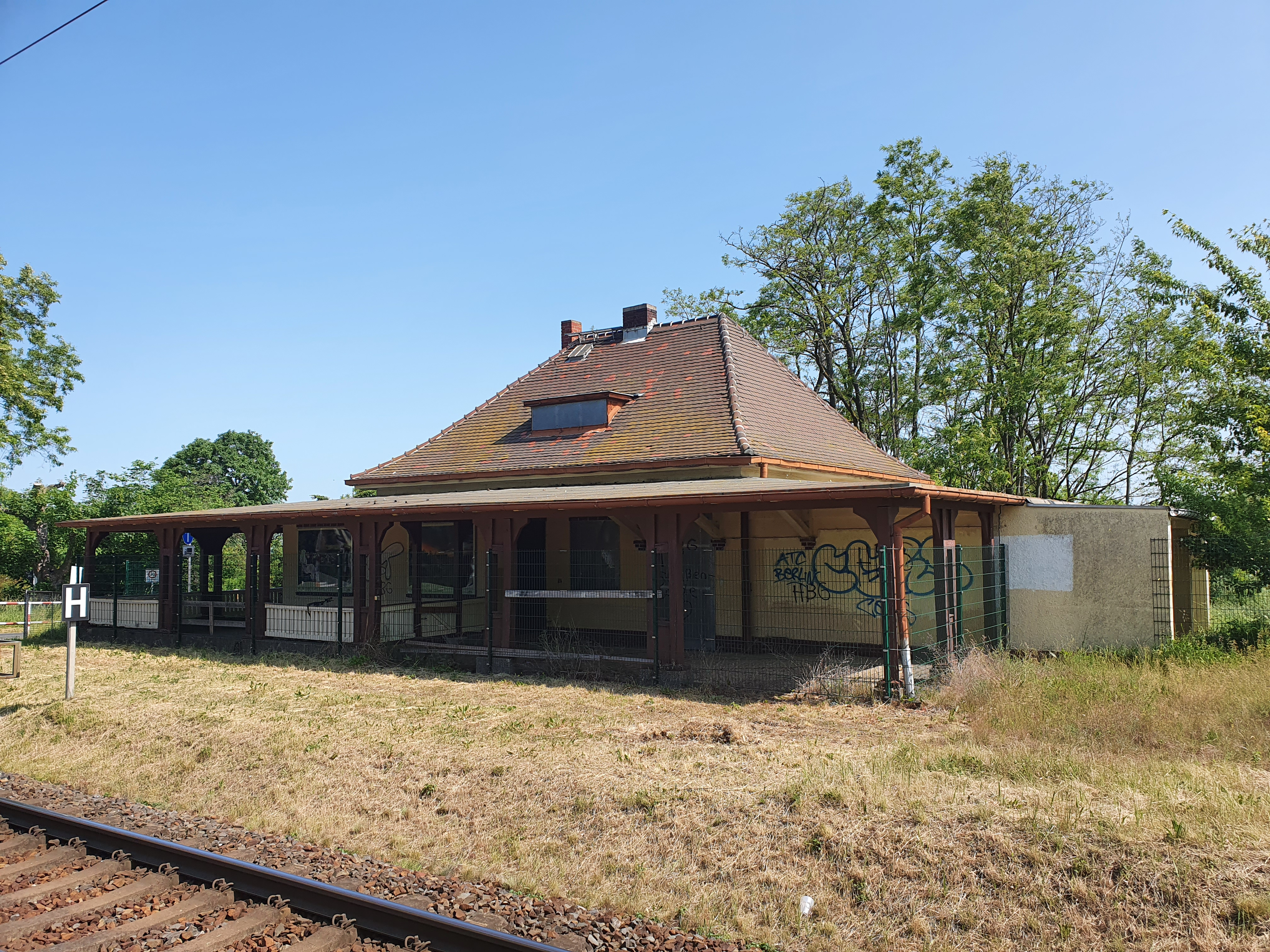
Reception building in 2023 (under renovation)

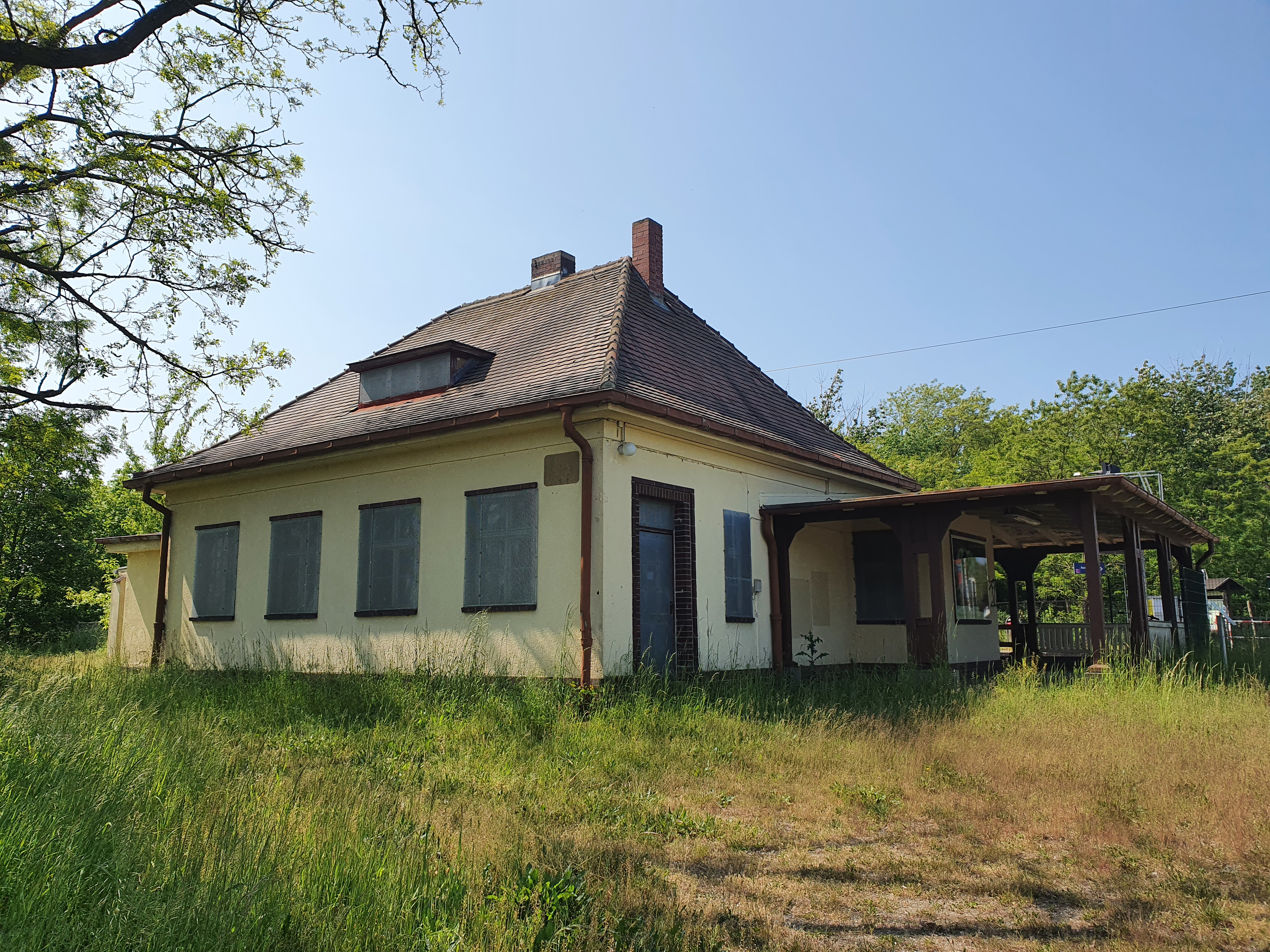
Reception building in 2023 (under renovation)

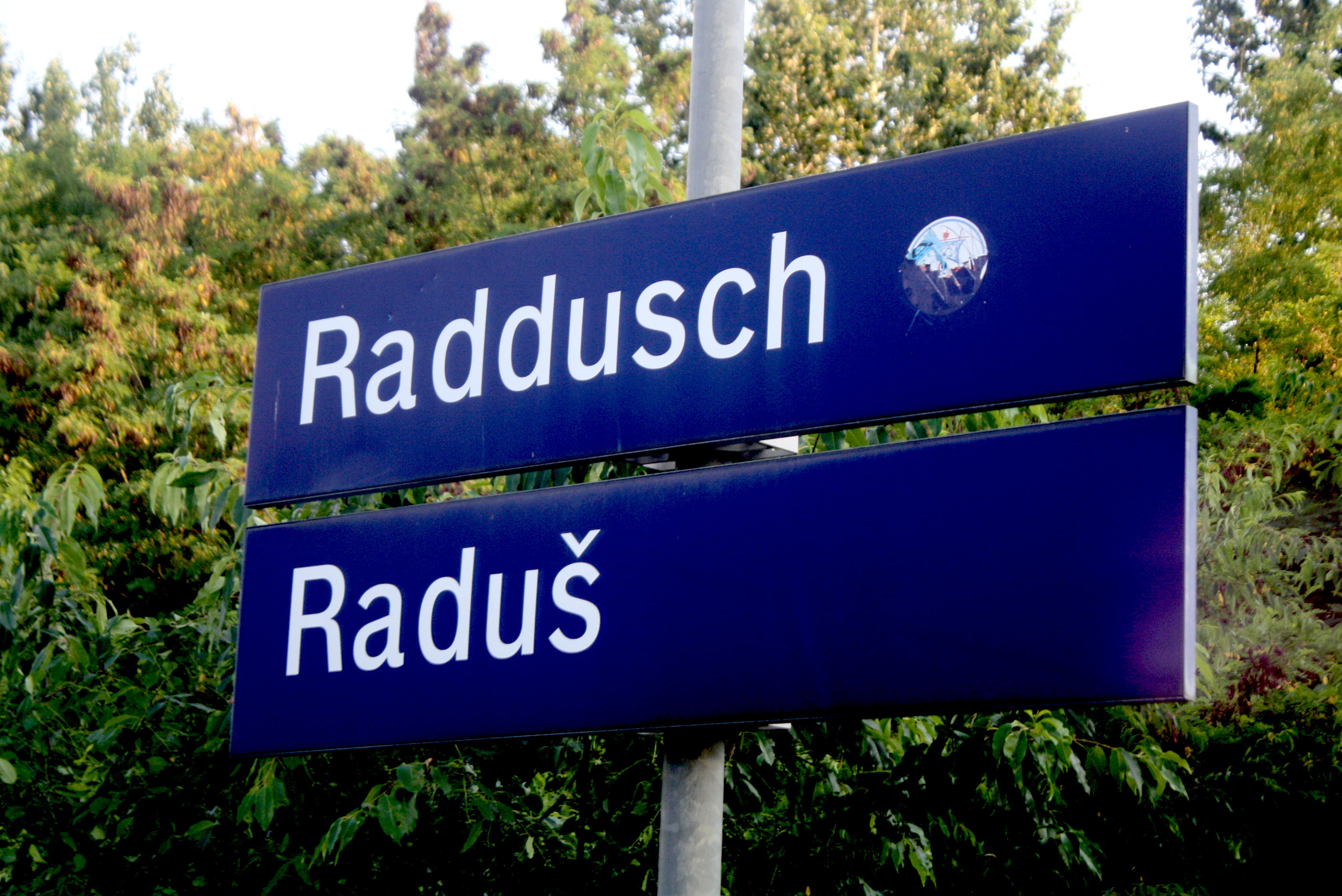
Bilingual sign in German and Lower Sorbian
