= Kolkwitz station =

Railway station in Germany

Kolkwitz Gołkojce
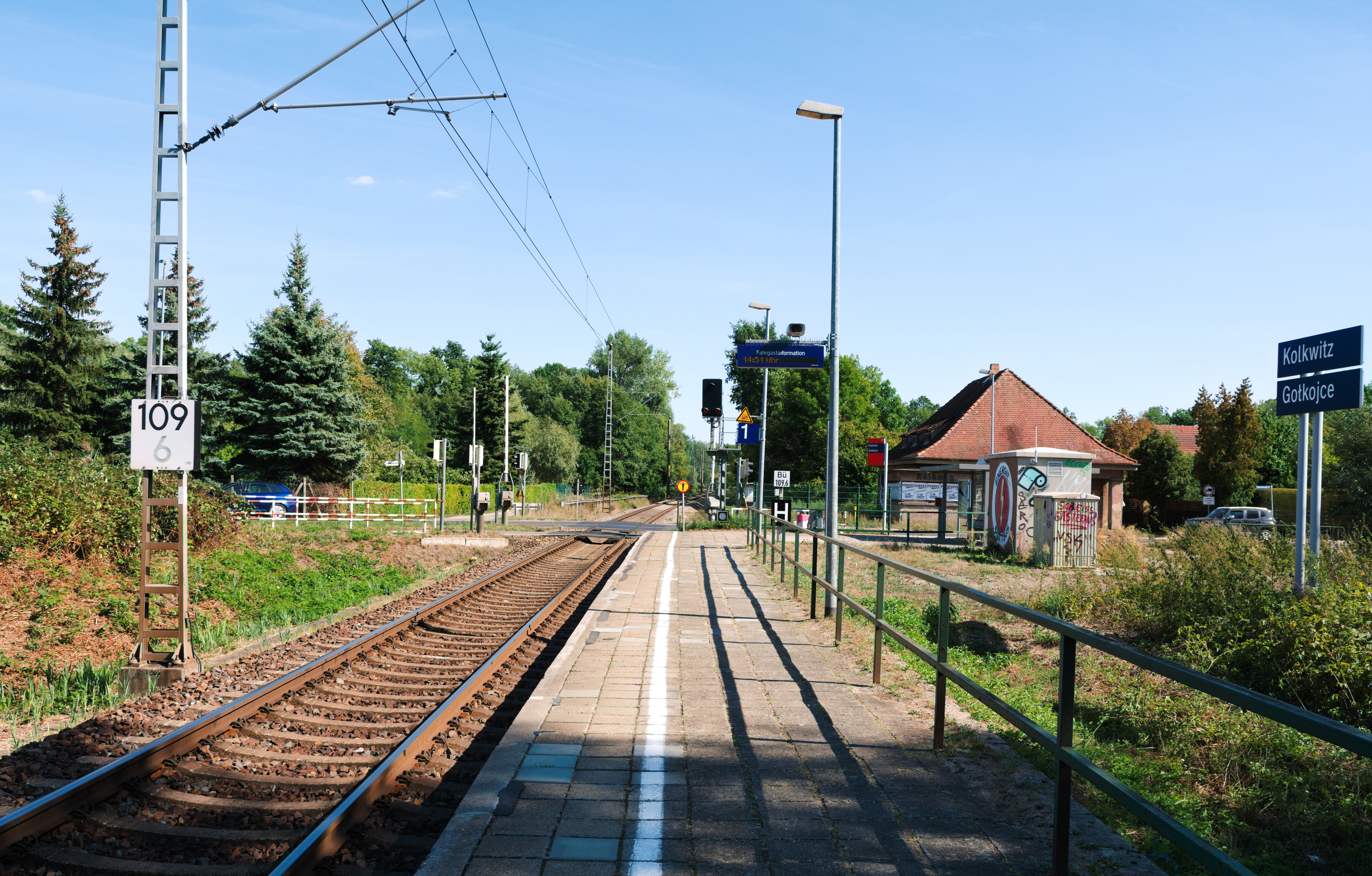
- 2019

General information
- Location: Bahnhofstraße 2; 03099 Kolkwitz; Brandenburg; Germany
- Coordinates: 51°45′28″N 14°14′58″E
- Owner: DB Netz
- Operator: DB Station&Service
- Lines: Berlin–Görlitz railway (KBS 202)
- Platforms: 1 side platform
- Tracks: 1
- Train operators: Ostdeutsche Eisenbahn

Other information
- Station code: 3313
- DS100 code: BKOW
- IBNR: 8012083
- Category: 6
- Fare zone: VBB: Cottbus B/7269
- Website: www.bahnhof.de

History
- Opened: 15 October 1878; 147 years ago

Services
Preceding station	Ostdeutsche Eisenbahn	Following station
Kunersdorf towards Nauen	RE 2 selected trains only	Cottbus Hbf Terminus
Location
- Location within Brandenburg

Kolkwitz/Gołkojce (German: Bahnhof Kolkwitz; Lower Sorbian: Dwórnišćo Gołkojce) is a railway station in the municipality of Kolkwitz, located in the Spree-Neiße district in Brandenburg, Germany.
