= Dhanashree (disambiguation) =

Dhanashree may refer to

- Danashri an ethnic Kipchak empress
- Dhanashree an Indian raga
- Puriya Dhanashree Indian raga
- Dhanashree Halbe Marathi writer
