= Kolkwitz Süd station =

Railway station in Germany

Kolkwitz Süd Gołkojce jug
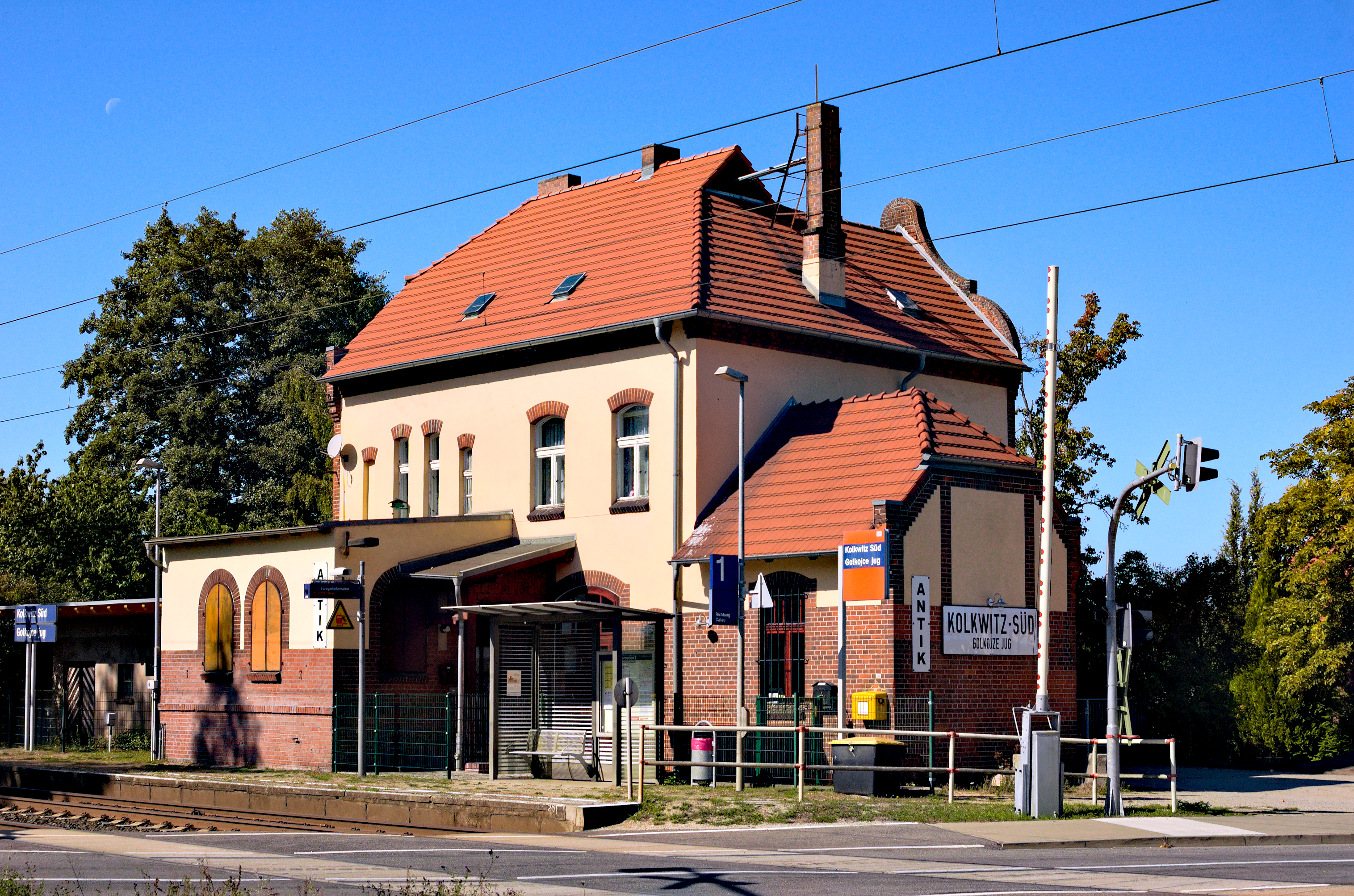
- Station in 2019

General information
- Location: Bahnhofstraße 55; 03099 Kolkwitz; Brandenburg; Germany
- Coordinates: 51°44′49″N 14°14′29″E
- System: Hp
- Owner: Deutsche Bahn
- Operator: DB Station&Service
- Lines: Halle–Cottbus railway (KBS 209.43)
- Platforms: 2 side platforms
- Tracks: 2
- Train operators: DB Regio Nordost
- Connections: RB 43

Other information
- Station code: 3314
- DS100 code: BKOS
- IBNR: 8012084
- Category: 6
- Fare zone: VBB: Cottbus B/7269
- Website: www.bahnhof.de

History
- Opened: before 1914

Services
Preceding station	DB Regio Nordost	Following station
Calau (Niederlausitz) towards Herzberg (Elster)	RB 43	Cottbus Hbf towards Frankfurt (Oder)
Location
- Location within Brandenburg

Kolkwitz Süd/Gołkojce jug (German: Bahnhof Kolkwitz Süd; Lower Sorbian: Dwórnišćo Gołkojce jug) is a railway station in the southern part of the municipality of Kolkwitz, located in the Spree-Neiße district in Brandenburg, Germany.

== Images ==
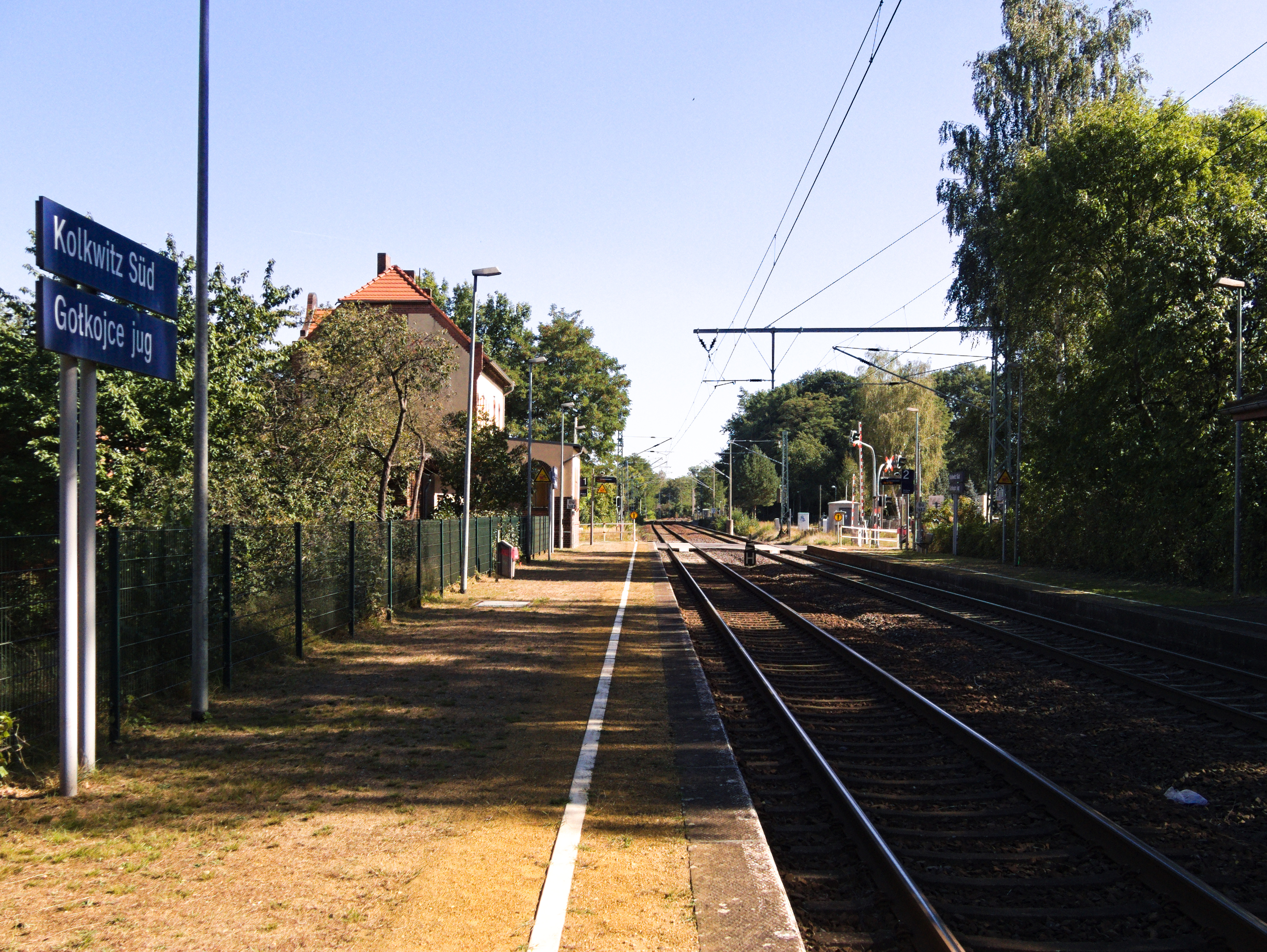
Platform 1 in 2016

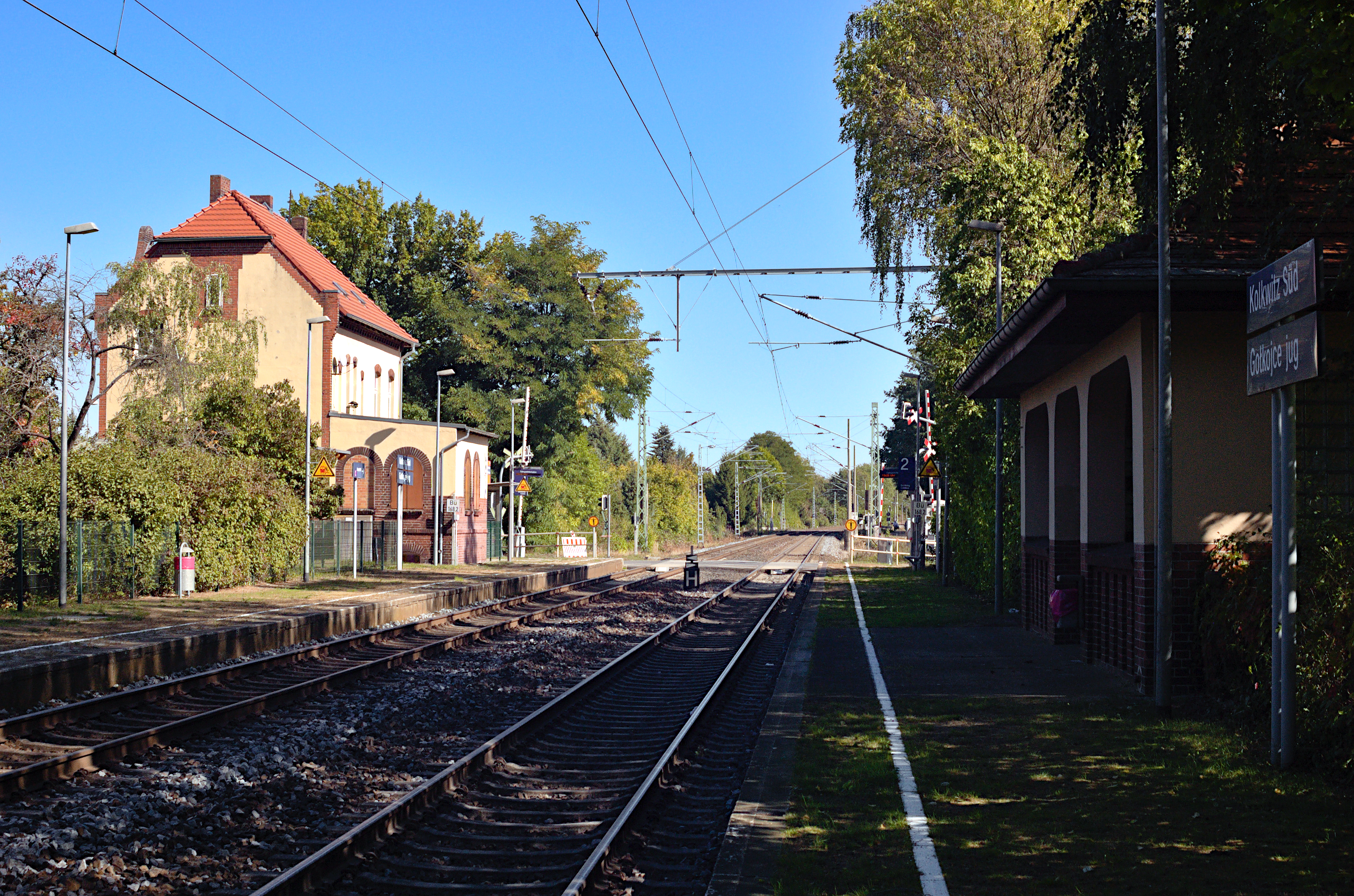
Platform 2 in 2016
