= Pauline Krautz =

Sorbian entrepreneur (1890 - 1941)

- Pawlina Renusojc
- Born: Pauline Rehnus; December 18, 1890; Dahlitz, Province of Brandenburg, Prussia, German Empire
- Died: September 16, 1941 (aged 50); Cottbus, Province of Brandenburg, Prussia, Nazi Germany

Pauline Krautz (born Pauline Rehnus; 18 December 1890 - 16 September 1941) was a Sorbian entrepreneur. Her active and public promotion of Sorbian culture was seen as part of a separatist threat at a time when the German government was pursuing the objective of moving Germany away from its traditional federalism, towards a more centralised structure. Krautz died in the women's prison in Cottbus, and has become celebrated as a victim of Nazi persecution.

== Life ==
Pauline Rehnus (in Sorbian Pawlina Renusojc) was born, the eldest of her parents' five recorded children, in Dahlitz (now part of Kolkwitz), a village a short distance outside Cottbus on its western side. Christian Rehnus, her father was a carpenter. She attended school in nearby Kolkwitz, which at this time still meant learning in both German and Sorbian. Her father had grown up as one of fourteen children of a farm worker and here parents were not wealthy, and after leaving school she remained with her family in order to help look after her younger siblings, while taking work in a Cottbus textile factory. In 1920 she married Reinhold Krautz who also worked in textiles. The marriage opened the way for Pauline to embark on an apprenticeship in dressmaking, which she successfully concluded with a "Masters" qualification.

In 1926 Pauline Krautz (in Sorbian Pawlina Krawkowa) opened a shop in Cottbus specialising in Wendish folk costumes, arts and embroidery. However, public fashion and government views were aligned during this period in regarding traditional folk costume as "quirky" at best, and the young girls for whom the dresses were designed were reluctant to wear them. Demand was correspondingly weak and she therefore diversified, starting to produce and sell dolls in folk costume. These turned out to be extremely popular with customers, both locally and across the border in Czechoslovakia. From 1932 Krautz was displaying her dolls at a succession of exhibitions in places such as Bautzen, Dresden, Hirschberg, Saarbrücken, Prague and Frankfurt. In 1936, she was able to send a large consignment of her costume dolls to Berlin in connection with the Olympic Games. However, the Nazi government which had taken power in 1933 was far more determined than its predecessor to exterminate Sorbian separatism, and the authorities became progressively more active in their hostility to a small business that based its success on the celebration of Sorbian identity. The fact that the dolls were popular in Slavic countries outside Germany, and that Krautz regularly visited Czechoslovakia with two of her sisters in connections with the flourishing business, raised her profile in the eyes of the authorities. She was criticised in the local press and questioned by the local Nazi administrator, but she was disinclined to keep her head down in response to government pressure.

In April 1938, Krautz was stopped in the street by a Gestapo agent. The authorities were changing the names of the villages in the area from Sorbian to German equivalents, raising indignation locally. Krautz's opinions on the matter may already have been widely known locally, and she now asked her Gestapo interlocutor how Hitler's supposed support for the people could be reconciled with changing the names of all their villages. She was arrested the next day and taken into investigative custody.

Krautz spent eleven months detained in the women's prison in Cottbus, during which time her interrogators accused her of "unpatriotic attacks on the state and on the party" ("heimtückischer Angriffe auf Staat und Partei") while using all possible means to browbeat her and blackmail her into confessing that she was a spy working on behalf of the Czechoslovak intelligence services. After eleven months they released her, citing lack of evidence and she returned to her parents' house to recuperate. At the time of her release she was required to surrender, in writing, all her legal rights, to set aside any claims against the state. Manufacturing more costume dolls became impossible because no business in Cottbus would sell her the necessary raw materials and in any case no business in the Spreewald region would buy from her any more. Pauline Krautz died on 16 September 1941. With her last breath she asked that the sermon at her funeral should be delivered in the Wendish (i.e. Sorbian) language, but this wish could not be met: two Gestapo agents attended her funeral.

On the 120th anniversary of her birth, on 18 December 2010, a memorial tablet (Stolperstein) was unveiled to Pauline Krautz at Cottbus, outside the site of her shop in the Sandow Street ("Sandower Straße"). The event was followed by a celebration of her life at the city hall.
