= Vetschau station =

Railway station in Brandenburg, Germany

Vetschau Wětosow
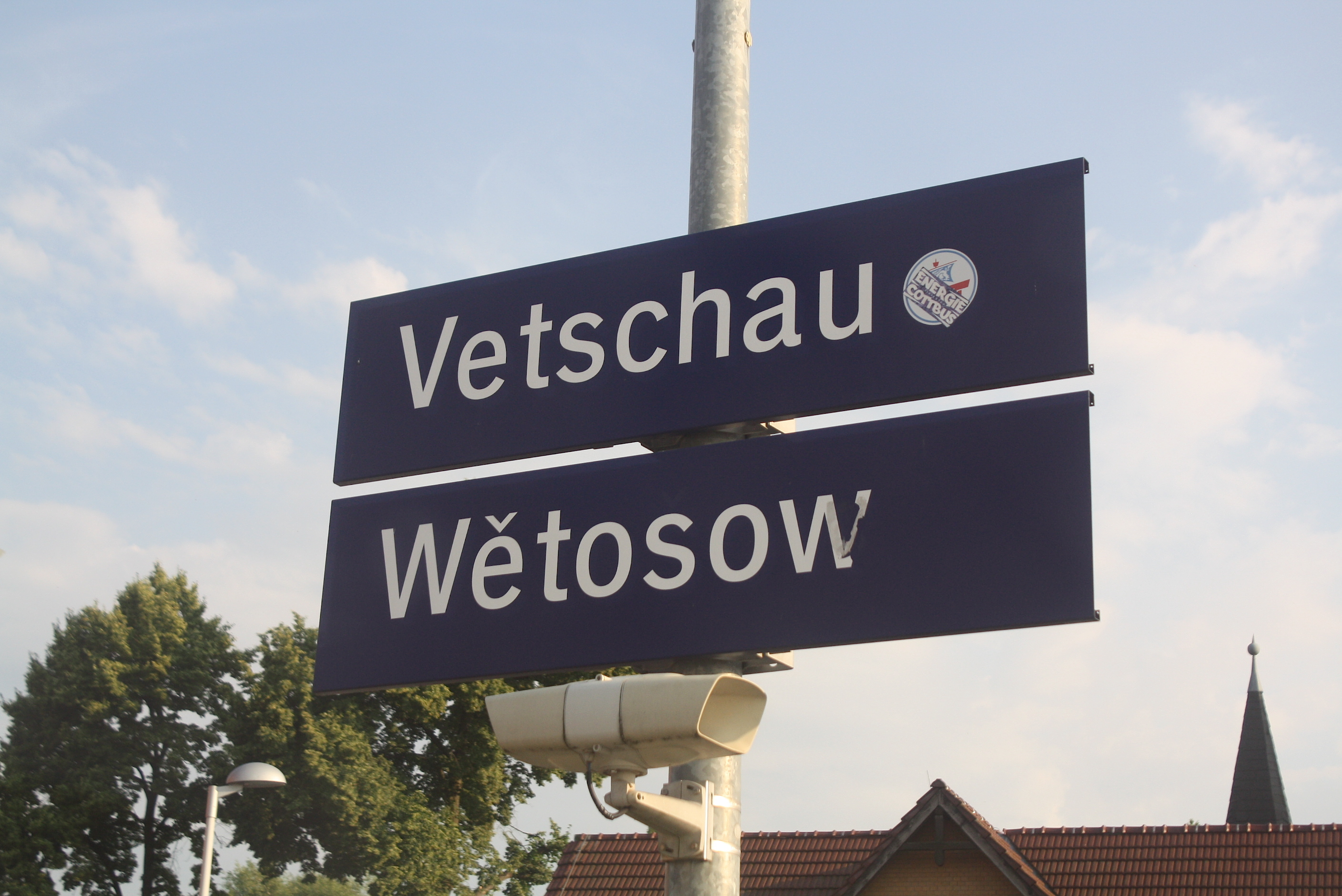
- Bilingual station sign in 2015, in German and Lower Sorbian

General information
- Location: Bahnhofstraße 1; 03226 Vetschau; Brandenburg; Germany
- Coordinates: 51°47′23″N 14°04′51″E
- Owner: DB Netz
- Operator: DB Station&Service
- Lines: Berlin–Görlitz railway (KBS 202)
- Platforms: 2 side platforms
- Tracks: 2
- Train operators: Ostdeutsche Eisenbahn

Construction
- Accessible: Yes

Other information
- Station code: 6411
- DS100 code: BV
- IBNR: 8013188
- Category: 6
- Fare zone: VBB: 7166
- Website: www.bahnhof.de

History
- Opened: before 1914

Services
Preceding station	Ostdeutsche Eisenbahn	Following station
Raddusch towards Nauen	RE 2	Kunersdorf towards Cottbus Hbf
Preceding station	DB Regio Nordost	Following station
Lübbenau (Spreewald) towards Berlin Hbf	RE 20	Cottbus Hbf Terminus
Location
- Location within Brandenburg

Vetschau/Wětosow (German: Bahnhof Vetschau; Lower Sorbian: Dwórnišćo Wětosow) is a railway station in the municipality of Vetschau, located in the Oberspreewald-Lausitz district in Brandenburg, Germany.
