= Halbe =

Halbe may refer to:

== People ==
- Dhanashree Halbe (born 1928), Marathi writer and translator
- Erna Halbe, married name of Erna Lang (1892-1983), German activist
- Halbe Zijlstra (born 1969), Dutch politician
- Max Halbe (1865–1944), German dramatist

== Places ==
- Halbe, Brandenburg, Germany

== Other ==
- Battle of Halbe
