= Lübben (Spreewald) station =

Railway station in Lübben (Spreewald), Germany

Lübben (Spreewald) Lubin (Błota)
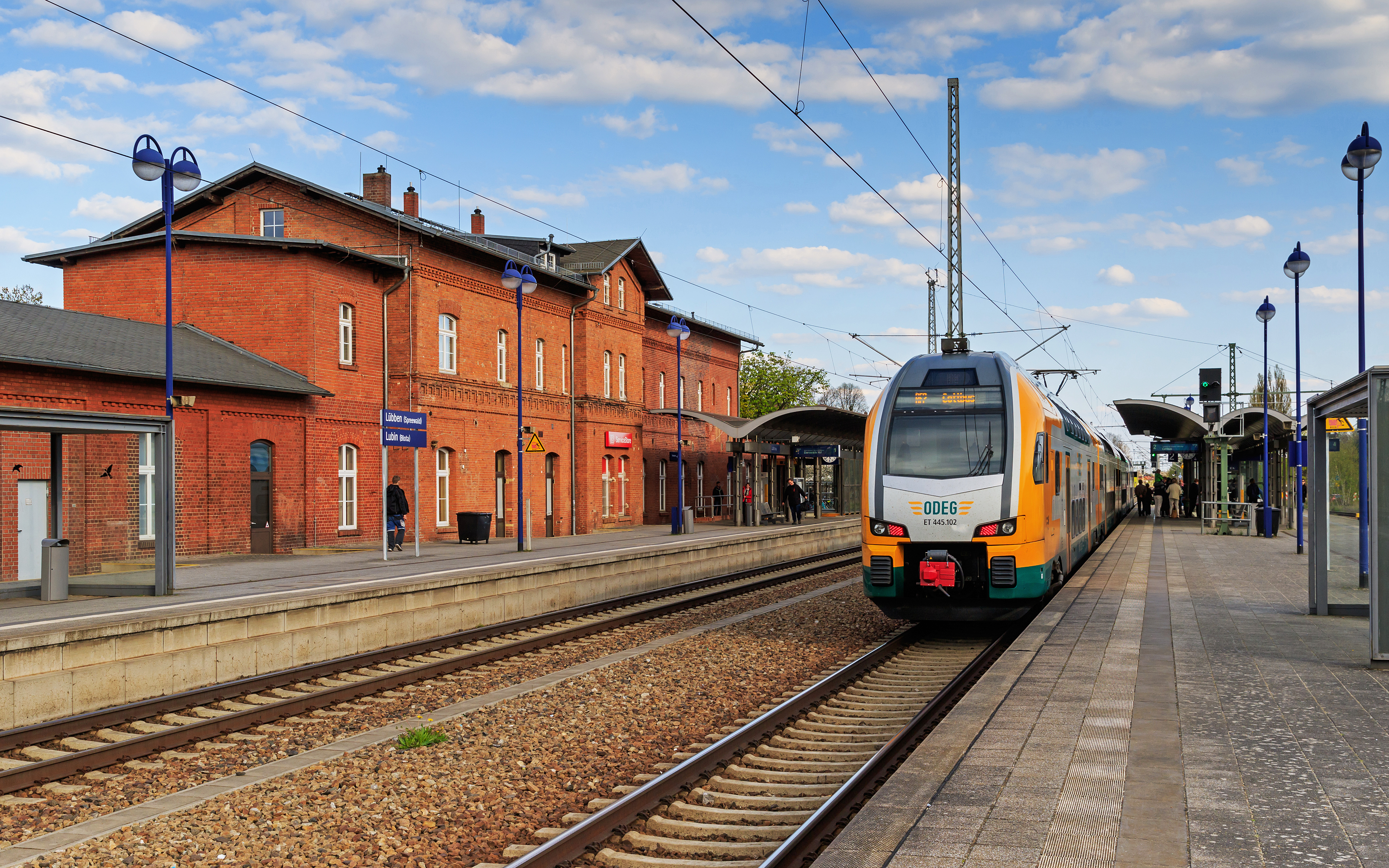
- 2016

General information
- Location: Bahnhofstraße 1; 15907 Lübben; Brandenburg; Germany
- Coordinates: 51°51′43″N 13°57′40″E
- Owner: DB Netz
- Operator: DB Station&Service
- Lines: Berlin–Görlitz railway (KBS 202); Lower Lusatian Railway
- Platforms: 1 island platform 1 side platform
- Tracks: 4
- Train operators: DB Fernverkehr; DB Regio Nordost; ODEG

Construction
- Accessible: Yes

Other information
- Station code: 3802
- DS100 code: BLB
- IBNR: 8010217
- Category: 4
- Fare zone: VBB: 6863
- Website: www.bahnhof.de

History
- Opened: 13 September 1866; 159 years ago

Services
Preceding station	DB Fernverkehr	Following station
Königs Wusterhausen towards Norddeich Mole	IC 56	Lübbenau (Spreewald) towards Cottbus Hbf
Preceding station	Ostdeutsche Eisenbahn	Following station
Brand Tropical Islands towards Nauen	RE 2	Terminus
Preceding station	DB Regio Nordost	Following station
Lubolz towards Dessau Hbf	RE 7	Lübbenau (Spreewald) towards Senftenberg
Königs Wusterhausen towards Berlin Hbf	RE 20	Lübbenau (Spreewald) towards Lübbenau (Spreewald) or Cottbus Hbf
Location
- Location within Brandenburg Location within Germany Location within Europe

Lübben (Spreewald)/Lubin (Błota) (German: Bahnhof Lübben (Spreewald); Lower Sorbian: Dwórnišćo Lubin (Błota)) is a railway station in the town of Lübben, located in the Dahme-Spreewald district in Brandenburg, Germany.
