= Calau (Niederlausitz) station =

Railway station in Brandenburg, Germany

Calau (Niederl)
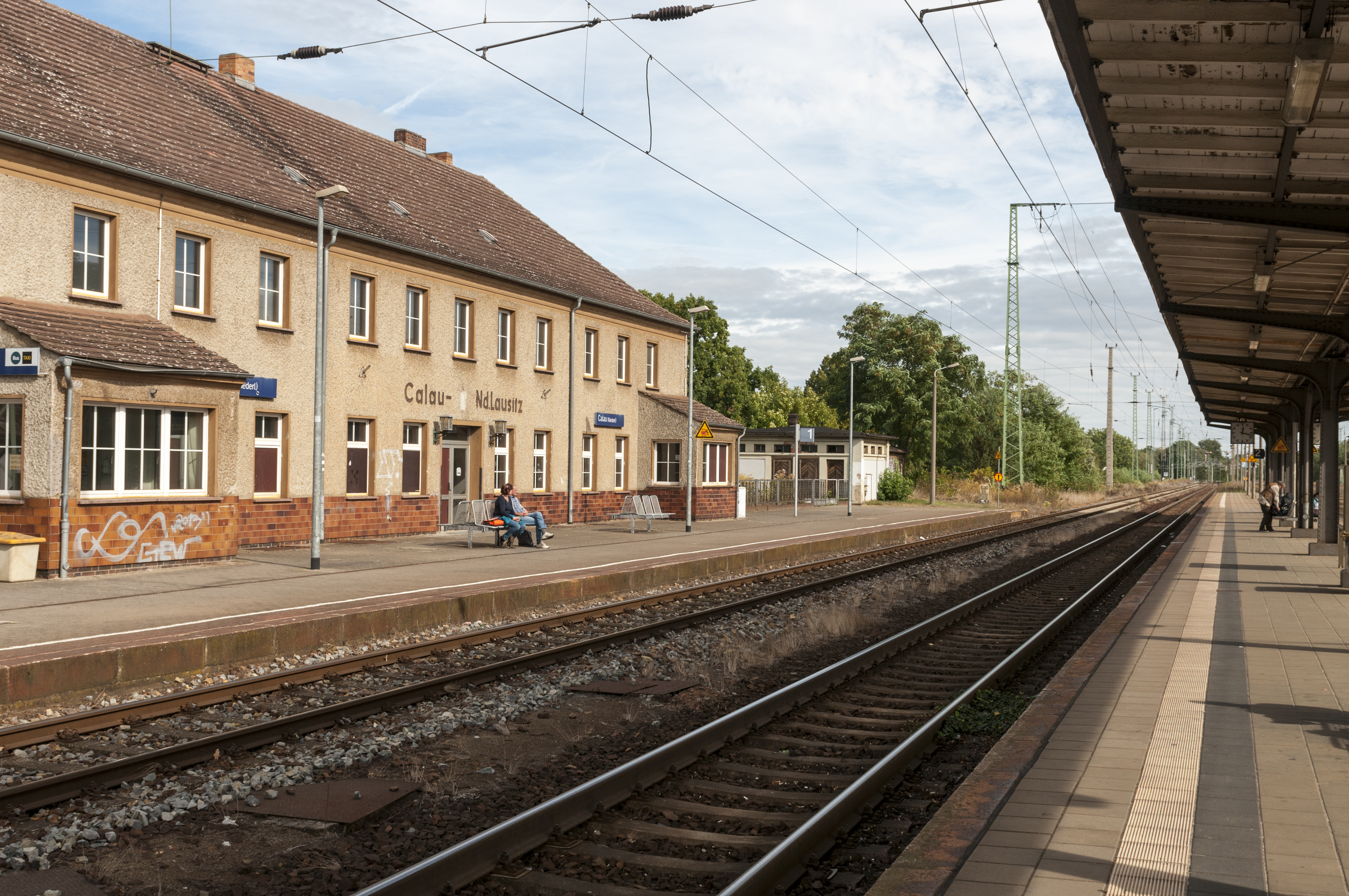
- 2016

General information
- Location: Am Bahnhof 6; 03205 Calau; Brandenburg; Germany
- Coordinates: 51°44′17″N 13°58′48″E
- Owner: Deutsche Bahn
- Operator: DB Station&Service
- Lines: Halle–Cottbus railway (KBS 215); Lübbenau–Kamenz railway (KBS 209.14)
- Platforms: 1 island platform 2 side platforms
- Tracks: 5
- Train operators: DB Regio Nordost

Other information
- Station code: 1019
- DS100 code: BC
- IBNR: 8010069
- Category: 5
- Fare zone: : 7264
- Website: www.bahnhof.de

History
- Opened: 1 December 1871; 154 years ago

Services
Preceding station	DB Regio Nordost	Following station
Lübbenau (Spreewald) towards Dessau Hbf	RE 7	Luckaitztal towards Senftenberg
Finsterwalde (Niederlausitz) towards Leipzig Hbf	RE 10	Cottbus Hbf towards Frankfurt (Oder)
Gollmitz (Niederlausitz) towards Herzberg (Elster)	RB 43	Kolkwitz Süd towards Frankfurt (Oder)
Location
- Location within Brandenburg

Calau (Niederlausitz) station is a railway station in the municipality of Calau, located in the Oberspreewald-Lausitz district in Brandenburg, Germany.
