= Schönwalde (Spreewald) station =

Train station in Brandenburg state, Germany

Schönwalde (Spreewald)
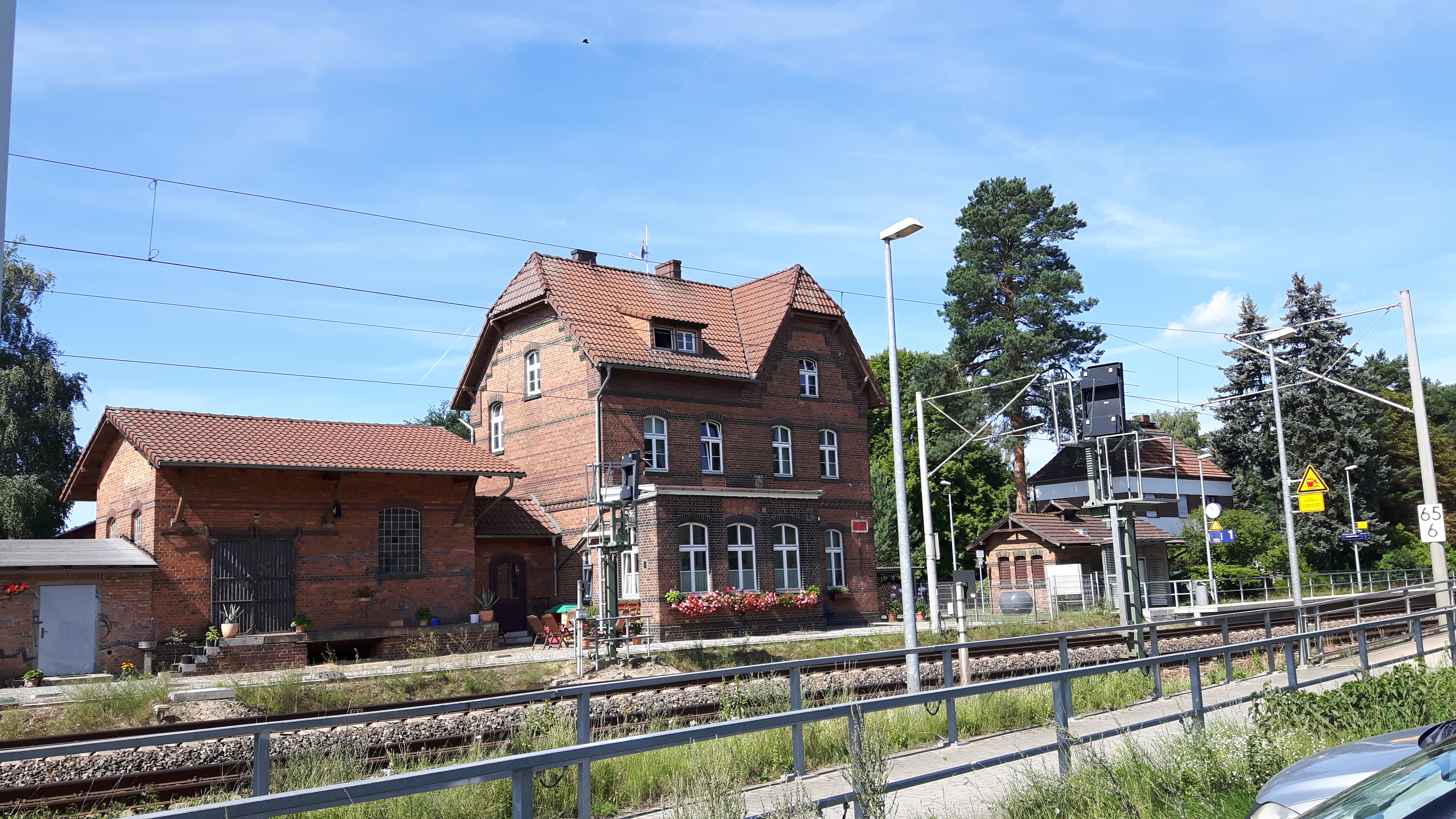
- 2017

General information
- Location: Bahnhofstraße 58; 15910 Schönwald; Brandenburg; Germany
- Coordinates: 51.9914°N 13.7769°E
- System: Hp
- Owner: Deutsche Bahn
- Operator: DB Netz; DB Station&Service
- Lines: Berlin–Görlitz railway (KBS 202)
- Platforms: 2 side platforms
- Tracks: 2
- Train operators: DB Regio Nordost
- Connections: RE 7

Construction
- Parking: yes
- Cycle facilities: yes
- Accessible: yes

Other information
- Station code: 5675
- DS100 code: BSCH
- IBNR: 8012923
- Category: 6
- Fare zone: VBB: 6761
- Website: www.bahnhof.de

Services
Preceding station	DB Regio Nordost	Following station
Brand Tropical Islands towards Dessau Hbf	RE 7	Lubolz towards Senftenberg
Location
- Location within Brandenburg Location within Germany Location within Europe

Schönwalde (Spreewald) station is a railway station in the municipality of Schönwald, located in the Dahme-Spreewald district in Brandenburg, Germany.
