= Lübbenau (Spreewald) station =

Railway station in Lübbenau, Germany

Lübbenau (Spreewald) Lubnjow (Błota)
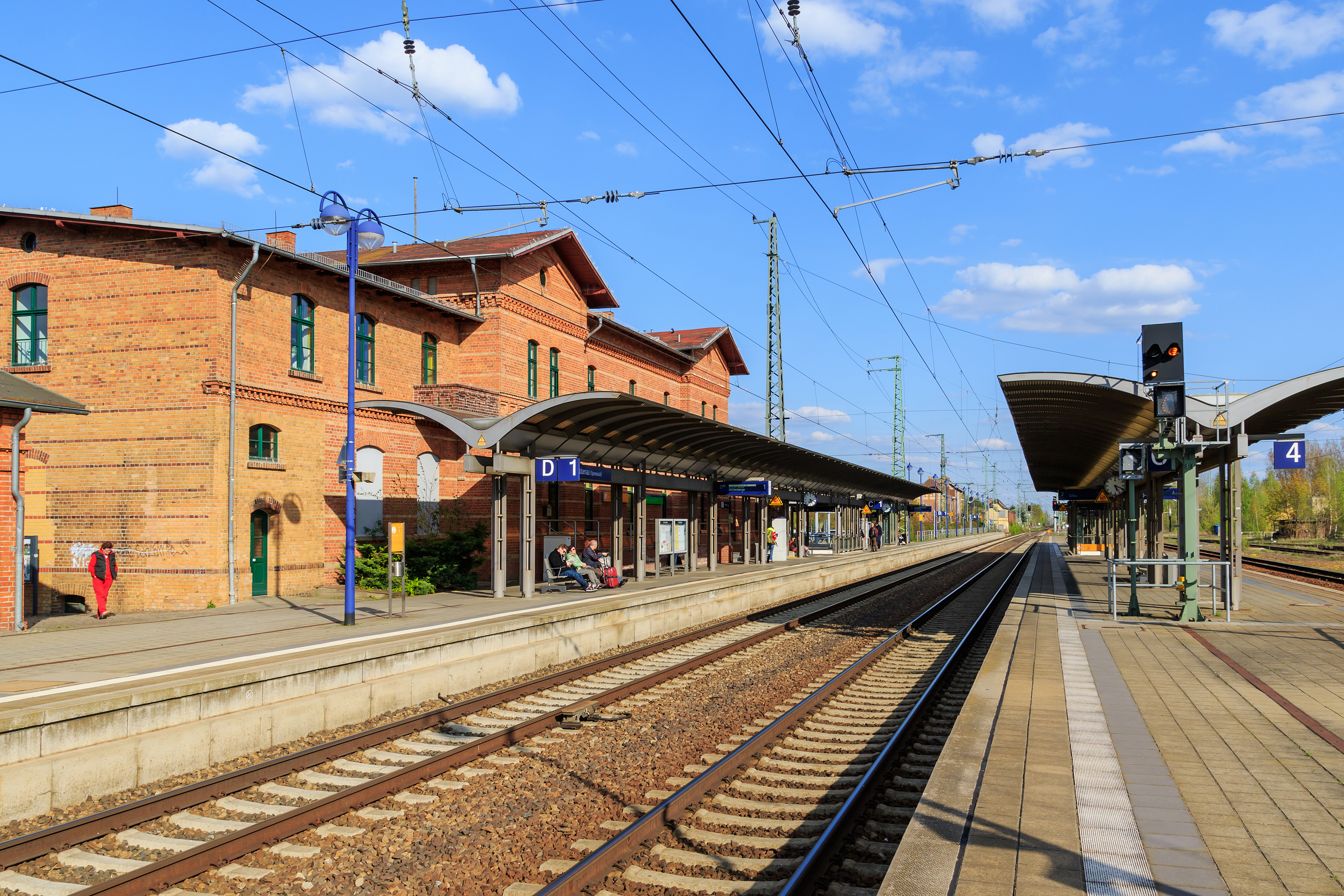
- 2016

General information
- Location: Bahnhofstraße 3a 03222 Lübbenau; Brandenburg; Germany
- Coordinates: 51°51′43″N 13°57′41″E
- Owner: DB Netz
- Operator: DB Station&Service
- Lines: Berlin–Görlitz railway (KBS 202); Lübbenau–Kamenz railway (KBS 209.14)
- Platforms: 1 island platform 1 side platform
- Tracks: 4
- Train operators: DB Fernverkehr; DB Regio Nordost; ODEG

Construction
- Accessible: Yes

Other information
- Station code: 3805
- DS100 code: BLN
- IBNR: 8010220
- Category: 4
- Fare zone: VBB: 6964
- Website: www.bahnhof.de

History
- Opened: 13 September 1866; 159 years ago

Services
Preceding station	DB Fernverkehr	Following station
Lübben (Spreewald) towards Norddeich Mole	IC 56	Cottbus Hbf Terminus
Preceding station	Ostdeutsche Eisenbahn	Following station
Lübben (Spreewald) towards Nauen	RE 2	Raddusch towards Cottbus Hbf
Preceding station	DB Regio Nordost	Following station
Lübben (Spreewald) towards Dessau Hbf	RE 7	Calau towards Senftenberg
Lübben (Spreewald) towards Berlin Hbf	RE 20	Vetschau towards Cottbus Hbf
Location
- Location within Brandenburg Location within Germany Location within Europe

Lübbenau (German: Bahnhof Lübbenau) is a railway statiion located in Lübbenau, Germany. The station is located on the Berlin–Görlitz railway and Lübbenau–Kamenz railway. The train services are operated by DB Regio Nordost and Ostdeutsche Eisenbahn (ODEG).

In the 2026 timetable the following lines stop at the station:

Line	Route	Frequency
IC 56	(Norddeich Mole –) Emden – Bremen – Hannover – Magdeburg – Berlin Hauptbahnhof – Königs Wusterhausen – Lübbenau (Spreewald) – Cottbus	1 train pair
RE 2	Nauen – Berlin-Spandau – Berlin – Königs Wusterhausen – Lübbenau (Spreewald) – Vetschau – Cottbus	Hourly
RE 7	Dessau – Bad Belzig – Michendorf – Berlin – Königs Wusterhausen – Lübbenau (Spreewald) – Calau – Senftenberg	Hourly
RE 20	Berlin Hbf – Potsdamer Platz – Südkreuz – BER Airport – Königs Wusterhausen – Lübbenau (Spreewald) (– Vetschau – Cottbus)	Hourly
As of 14 December 2025

Until mid-December 2014 the station was also served by EuroCity "Wawel", which used to run once daily between Berlin Hauptbahnhof and Wrocław Główny.
