= Wawel (train) =

Polish international express train

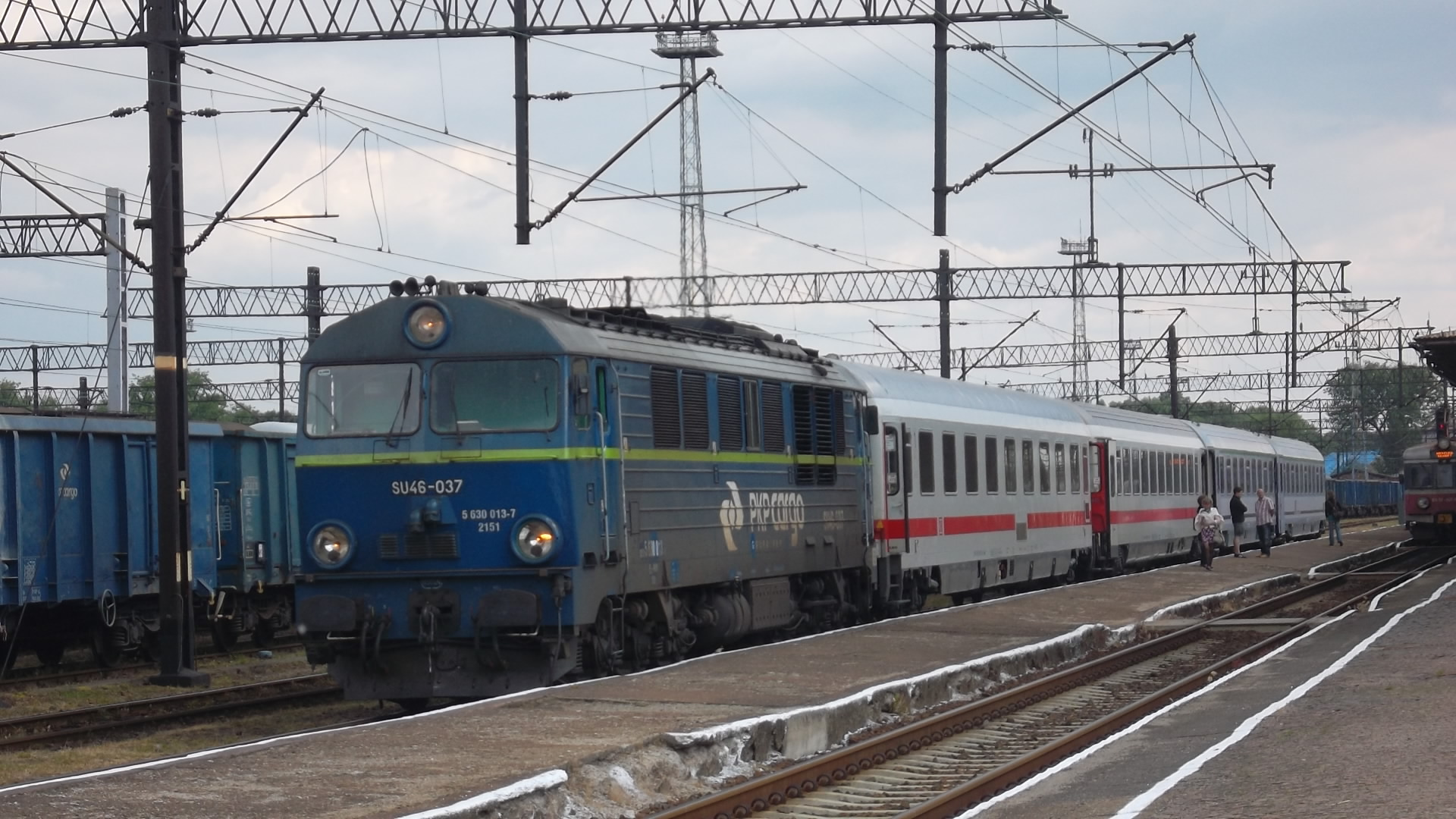
- PKP class SU46 with EuroCity "Wawel" ready to depart for Berlin after change of locomotives at Węgliniec in Poland (May 2012)

Overview
- Service type: InterCity (IC); (1995–2006); EuroCity (EC); (2006-2014, since 2020)
- Status: Active
- Locale: Poland; Germany
- First service: 1995
- Former operators: DB Fernverkehr, PKP Intercity

Route
- Termini: Przemyśl Główny/; Kraków Główny /; Wrocław Główny; Berlin /; Hamburg-Altona
- Service frequency: Daily
- Train numbers: IC 48/49; (1995–1998); IC 42/43; (1998–2002); IC 240/241; (2002–2006); EC 240/241; (2006–2008); EC 340/341; (2008–2010); EC 248/249; (2010–2014); EC 56/57; (since 2020)

On-board services
- Class: 1./2.

Technical
- Track gauge: 1,435 mm (4 ft 8 1/2 in)

Wawel is a named international express train. Introduced in 1995 as an InterCity service, it was upgraded to EuroCity category by its operators PKP Intercity and DB Fernverkehr in 2006. The service was withdrawn at the end of 2014 but reintroduced in December 2020.

In its early years, the train linked Kraków and Wrocław in Poland with Berlin and Hamburg in Germany. It was named after the Wawel, former residence of the Polish kings in Kraków. Since 2022, the eastern terminus of the line has been located further east at Przemyśl, a short distance away from the Ukrainian border.

== Route ==
Initially, trains originated at Kraków Główny railway station via Katowice and Wrocław and used the railway line towards Szczecin up to the Rzepin rail hub, from where they ran on the Warsaw–Kunowice railway to the Polish-German border and Frankfurt (Oder). Between there and Berlin, Wawel ran on the Lower Silesian-Marcher Railway line.

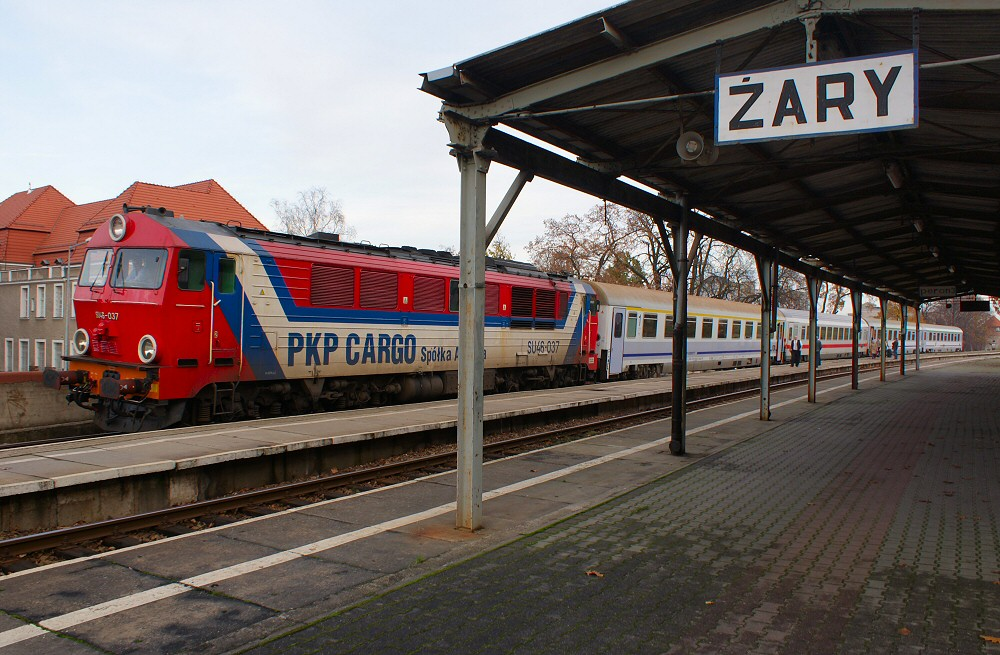
EuroCity Wawel at Żary, 2008

In 2001, weekday services were extended to Hamburg while weekend services continued to terminate in Berlin. At that time trains were running via Cottbus, passing the German-Polish border at Forst (Lausitz), then via Żary, Żagań, and Legnica to Wrocław and continued to Kraków. From 2010, trains ran from Żary via Węgliniec railway station. In December 2012, the eastern section of the route was cut back to Wrocław, and in May 2013, the terminus of the western weekday extension was temporarily moved east, to Lüneburg.

The Wawel has never been able to achieve the journey times of the fast diesel multiple unit trains operated by the Deutsche Reichsbahn that ran on the line in the 1930s. Therefore, passenger numbers significantly decreased upon construction of the parallel A4 and A18 motorways in Poland. Service was discontinued in December 2014.

The operator of the service between 1995 and 2014, PKP Intercity, then used the name Wawel on some of its domestic InterCity trains from Kraków to Bydgoszcz in 2016, Kraków to Szczecin in 2017 and 2018 and from Zielona Góra to Łódź in 2019.

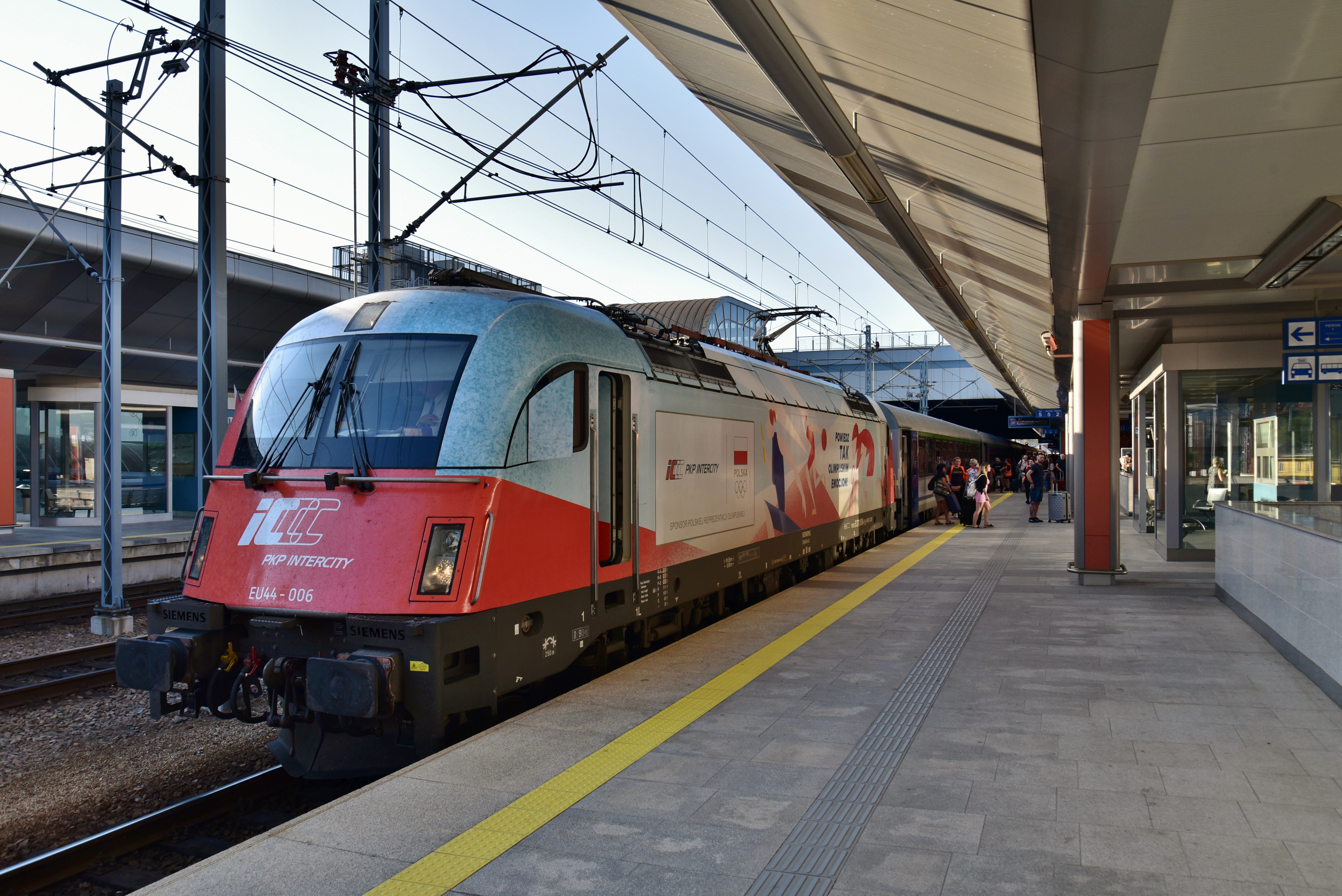
A Przemyśl Główny-bound EuroCity Wawel at Kraków Główny in 2024

In mid 2017, it was announced that service may resume in December 2019. In September 2019, resumption was pushed back to June 2020 – due to different reasons including the COVID-19 crisis. The service finally restarted in December 2020. Compared with the 'old' Wawel train, the route changed completely: The train now originated in Berlin Hbf instead of Hamburg Hbf, between Berlin and Legnica it uses the faster and electrified route via Frankfurt (Oder), and the eastern terminus has been moved further east to Kraków Główny instead of Wrocław Główny.

Later, beginning in the 2021/2022 timetable, the eastern terminus was shifted even further East, thus lengthening the line. The line now connects Przemyśl near the Ukrainian border, via Rzeszów and Tarnów, to Kraków and destinations further west.

Schedule year	Train route
2013–2014	Hamburg Hbf – Hamburg-Harburg – Lüneburg – Uelzen – Salzwedel – Stendal Hbf – Berlin-Spandau – Berlin Hbf – Berlin Südkreuz – Lübbenau (Spreew) – Cottbus Hbf – Forst (Lausitz) – Żary – Węgliniec – Bolesławiec – Legnica – Wrocław Główny
2021	Berlin Hbf – Berlin Ostbahnhof – Frankfurt (Oder) – Rzepin – Zielona Góra Główna – Głogów – Lubin – Legnica – Wrocław Główny – Opole Główne – Gliwice – Zabrze – Katowice – Kraków Główny
2022–present	Berlin Hbf – Berlin Ostbahnhof – Frankfurt (Oder) – Rzepin – Zielona Góra Główna – Głogów – Lubin – Legnica – Wrocław Główny – Opole Główne – Gliwice – Zabrze – Katowice – Kraków (Główny) – Kraków (Płaszów) – Bochnia – Tarnów – Dębica – Rzeszów – Łańcut – Przeworsk – Jarosław – Przemyśl

== See also ==
- History of rail transport in Germany
- History of rail transport in Poland
- List of EuroCity services
- List of named passenger trains of Europe
