= Dhanashree Halbe =

Marathi writer

Dhanashree M. Halbe
- Occupation: translator
- Writing career
- Language: Marathi

Dhanashree Halbe (born December 13, 1928) is a Marathi writer and translator.
