= Cottbus Hauptbahnhof =

Railway station in Brandenburg, Germany

Cottbus Hbf Chóśebuz gł.dw.
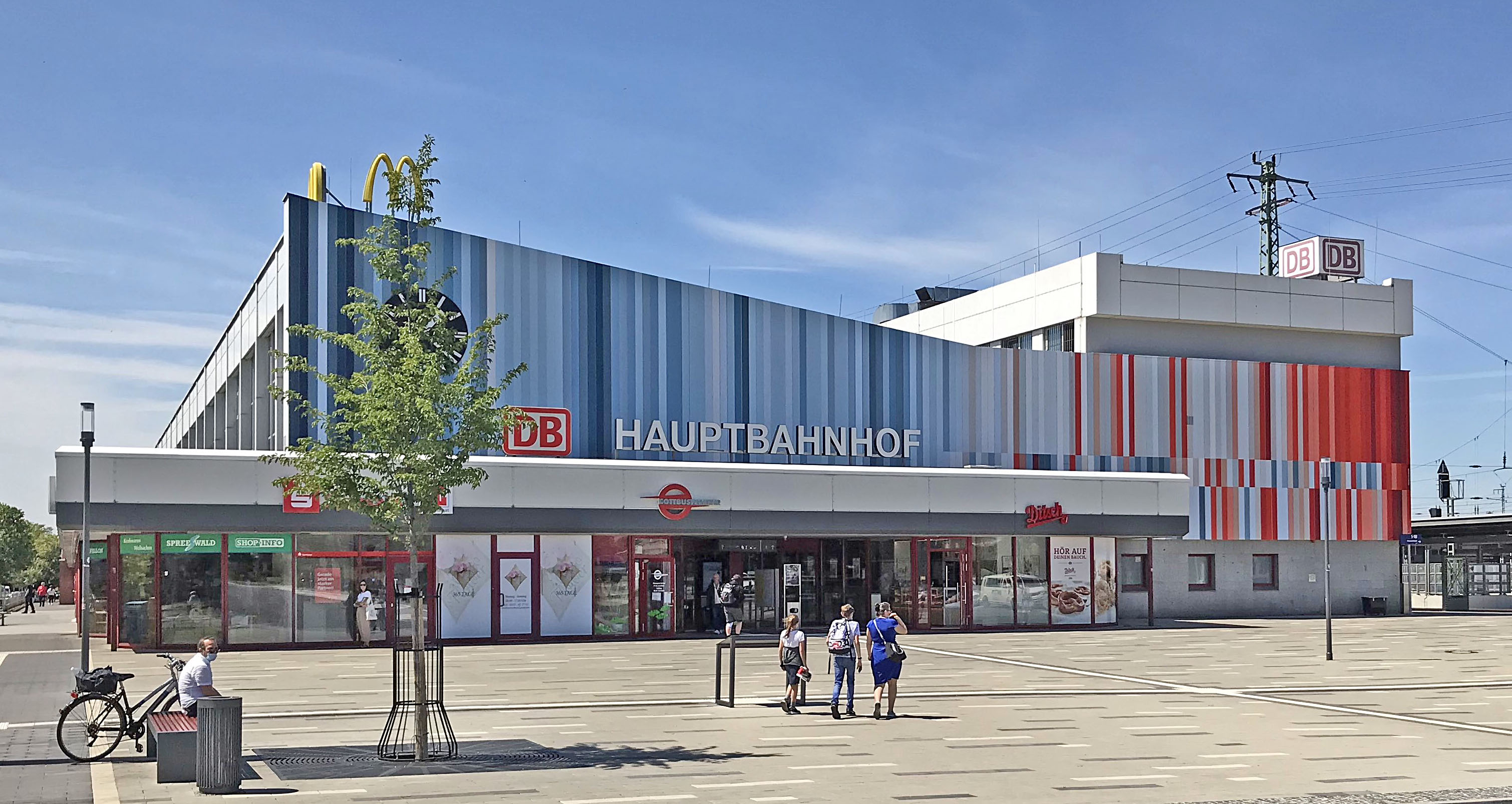
- Cottbus station forecourt with newly designed façade (June 2020)

General information
- Location: Vetschauer Str. 70, Cottbus, Brandenburg; Germany
- Coordinates: 51°45′3″N 14°19′35″E
- Lines: Berlin–Görlitz (km 114.7) (KBS 202 / 220); Halle–Cottbus (km 173.9) (KBS 209.43 / 215); Cottbus–Guben (km 173.9) (KBS 201 / 211); Cottbus–Forst–Żary (km -0.6) (KBS 209.46); Großenhain–Cottbus (km 79.7) (KBS 208); Cottbus–Grunow–Frankfurt (Oder) (km 79.7) (closed)
- Platforms: 10 (formerly 12)

Construction
- Accessible: Yes

Other information
- Station code: 1077
- DS100 code: BCS
- IBNR: 8010073
- Category: 2
- Fare zone: : Cottbus A/7270
- Website: www.bahnhof.de

History
- Opened: 13 September 1866; 159 years ago

Passengers
- < 50,000/day
Services
Preceding station	DB Fernverkehr	Following station
Lübbenau towards Norddeich Mole	IC 56	Terminus
Preceding station	DB Regio Nordost	Following station
Vetschau towards Bad Belzig	RE 7	Terminus
Calau (Niederlausitz) towards Leipzig Hbf	RE 10	Cottbus-Sandow towards Frankfurt (Oder)
Drebkau towards Elsterwerda	RE 13	Terminus
Leuthen (b Cottbus) towards Dresden-Neustadt	RE 18	Terminus
Vetschau towards Berlin Hbf	RE 20	Terminus
Kolkwitz Süd towards Herzberg (Elster)	RB 43	Cottbus-Sandow towards Frankfurt (Oder)
Leuthen (b Cottbus) towards Falkenberg (Elster)	RB 49	Terminus
Terminus	RB 92	Cottbus-Sandow towards Zielona Gora
Terminus	RB 93	Cottbus-Sandow towards Żagań
Berlin Ostkreuz towards Berlin-Lichtenberg	IRE "Kulturzug"	Weißwasser towards Wroclaw Glowny
Preceding station	Ostdeutsche Eisenbahn	Following station
Guben towards Magdeburg Hbf	RE 1	Terminus
Kolkwitz towards Nauen	RE 2	Terminus
Terminus	RB 46	Cottbus-Sandow towards Forst (Lausitz)
Terminus	RB 65	Neuhausen (bei Cottbus) towards Zittau
Location

Cottbus Hauptbahnhof (German) or Chóśebuz głowne dwórnišćo (Lower Sorbian) is one of the main railway stations of the German state of Brandenburg. It was called Cottbus station until 9 December 2018. It is located just south of central Cottbus. It is classified by Deutsche Bahn as a Category 2 station.

== History ==
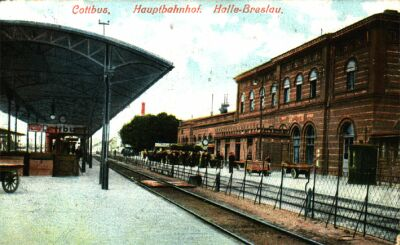
Old entrance building on historical postcard. View from the platforms

Cottbus station entered into operation on 13 September 1866 with the opening of the railway line from Berlin. In 1867, this line was extended to Görlitz. In 1870, the station building was inaugurated, located between the tracks as an "island station" (German: Inselbahnhof). In the following years, other railway lines were built in the region. The Großenhainer Bahnhof (the station serving trains to Großenhain) was opened on the Großenhain–Cottbus railway in 1873, north of the Berliner Bahnhof (the station serving trains to Berlin). In 1880, this station was closed and the trains were diverted to the Berlin station. The building of the Großenhainer Bahnhof still exists and serves the railway administration.

In 1886, the station's new owners, the Prussian state railways, built a tunnel to connect the platforms. To the north of the station there were originally freight facilities.

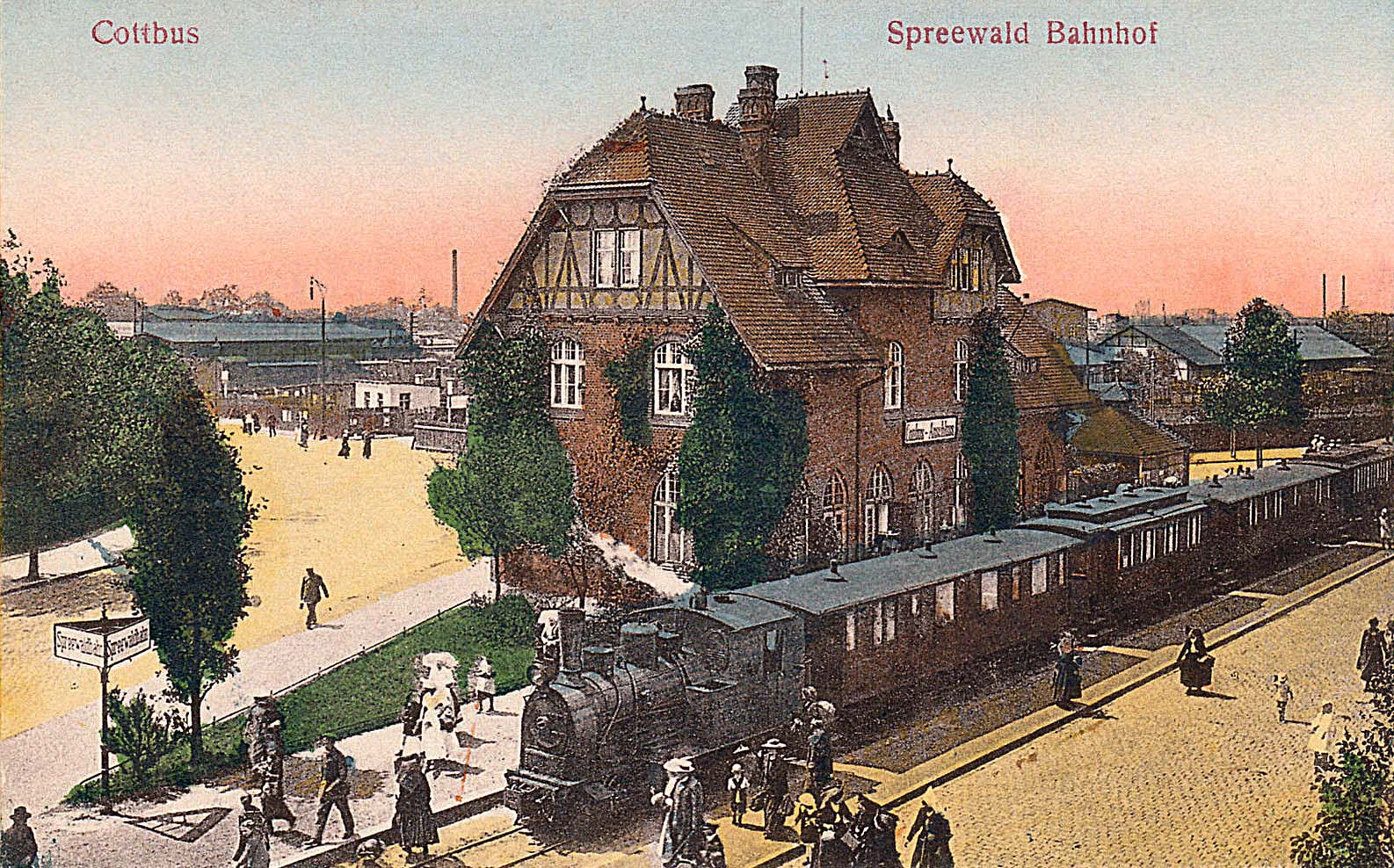
Station building of the Spreewald Railway (Postcard beginning of the 1920s)

In 1899, the Spreewald Railway was opened with its terminus on the edge of the track field north of the state station.

By 1927 there were plans to build a new building on the southern side of the tracks because of the lack of space in the station building, which was confined on its island. However, these were not realised because of the Great Depression.

In February 1945, the station building and other parts of the station were destroyed in an air raid. After the war, a barracks-like building was built for passengers to replace the destroyed building. This provisional building remained for a long time and proved to be more and more inadequate. In the late 1960s, there were plans to build a new station building on the south side of the line. In 1970, the first preparations were made for its construction. As Cottbus was an important railway junction, especially for freight, because of the extensive lignite mining in the region, extensive preparations had to be made before the main construction could begin. These included the duplication of several lines in the Cottbus area, in order to relieve the junction. An additional platform was built. In 1974, work began on the new platform tunnel. Finally, after four years of construction, on 5 October 1978, the new station building went into operation.

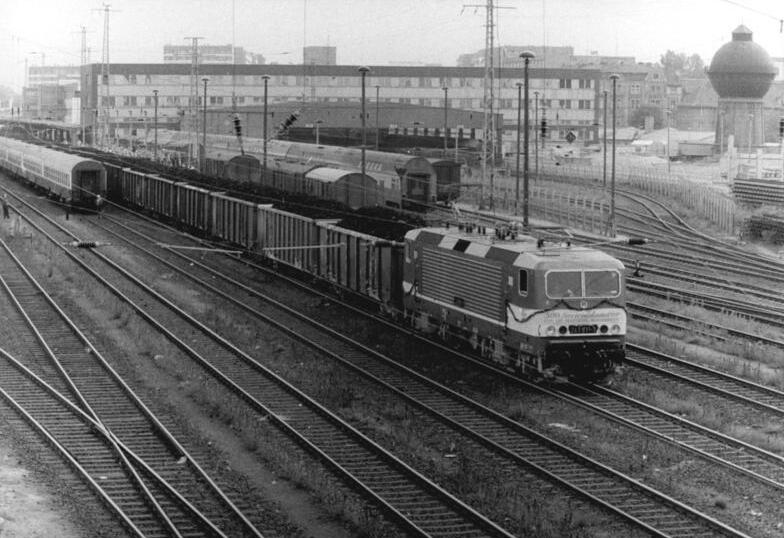
Cottbus station, departing freight train (1989)

On 30 September 1989, the Lübbenau–Cottbus line was electrified, including the tracks at Cottbus station. On 16 December 1989, electrification was extended to Finsterwalde on the Halle–Cottbus line. In 1990, it was extended to Senftenberg (on the Großenhain–Cottbus line) and Guben (Cottbus–Guben line).

In 1995, the National Garden Show (Bundesgartenschau) was held in Cottbus. On this occasion, the entrance building was extensively renovated and expanded.

At the end of November 2010, a new electronic interlocking system was put into operation at a cost of €50 million. Since then, all signals, switches and crossings in the area of Cottbus station have been controlled from the control centre at Berlin-Pankow.

In July 2012, representatives of the German and Polish transport ministries agreed to electrify the line from Cottbus to Wrocław (Cottbus-Forst railway). The plan was to run six Eurocity trains a day between Berlin and southern Poland, via Cottbus and Wrocław, once the construction work had been completed. However, electrification of the line was not on the cards. In 2020, it was decided that the electrification to Forst and the expansion from the current 120 km/h to 160 km/h would now be realized via the federal government's coal phase-out package of measures. The route to Görlitz (Berlin–Görlitz railway) is also to be electrified and expanded via the package of measures.

== Infrastructure ==
The station is located south of central Cottbus on an east–west orientation. The original structure of the station as an island station can still be easily recognised by the large open area between the tracks. On this island some of the outbuildings of the temporary station built after the war have been preserved. Originally, the station was reached from Bahnhofstraße, which runs east of the station on a bridge over the tracks; there is now no connection from the bridge.

On the central island there are two platform edges on through tracks and some bay platforms on terminating tracks. The station building, built in the style of the 1970s, is on the southern side of the tracks. During the reconstruction a new "home platform" was created next to the new entrance building. Between the entrance building and the central island, there are two island platforms and another north of it.

During the reconstruction, a tunnel was built from the new station building to the middle island. The original station tunnel is located about 100 metres (328 ft) to its west. It starts on the platform that faces the current tracks 2 and 3 and links the platforms with each other and with the northern exit on the city side. It could not, however, be extended to the new station building. To get from the station building to the northernmost platform or the northern entrance, it is necessary to change tunnels. At the northern entrance there are no ticket facilities or waiting rooms. In front of its exit is the Spreewaldbahnhof, the starting point of the disused narrow gauge Spreewald Railway. Between the northern entrance and the platforms there are facilities for freight. These are for the most part no longer in operation, including the freight loading and unloading facilities and the container terminal.

The entrance building contains a ticket office, various dining facilities, a bookstore, and a shop selling local products. There are facilities for waiting in the heated concourse building.

Directly in front of the entrance building is the stop for tram lines 1, 2 and 4 and some bus lines.

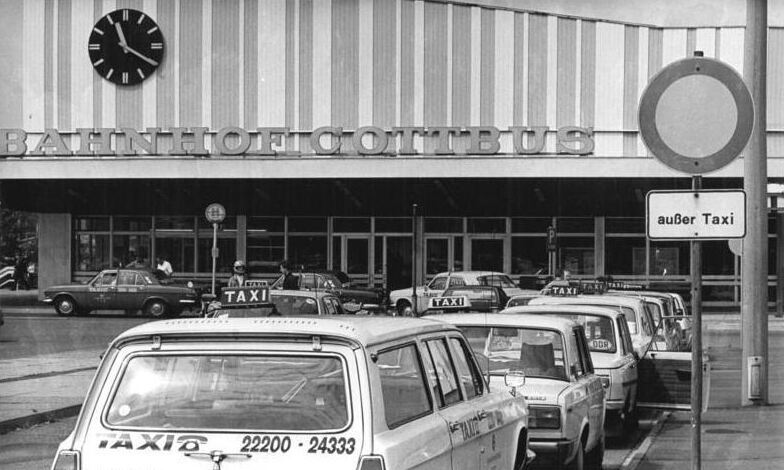
Cottbus station, entrance building from the east (1990)

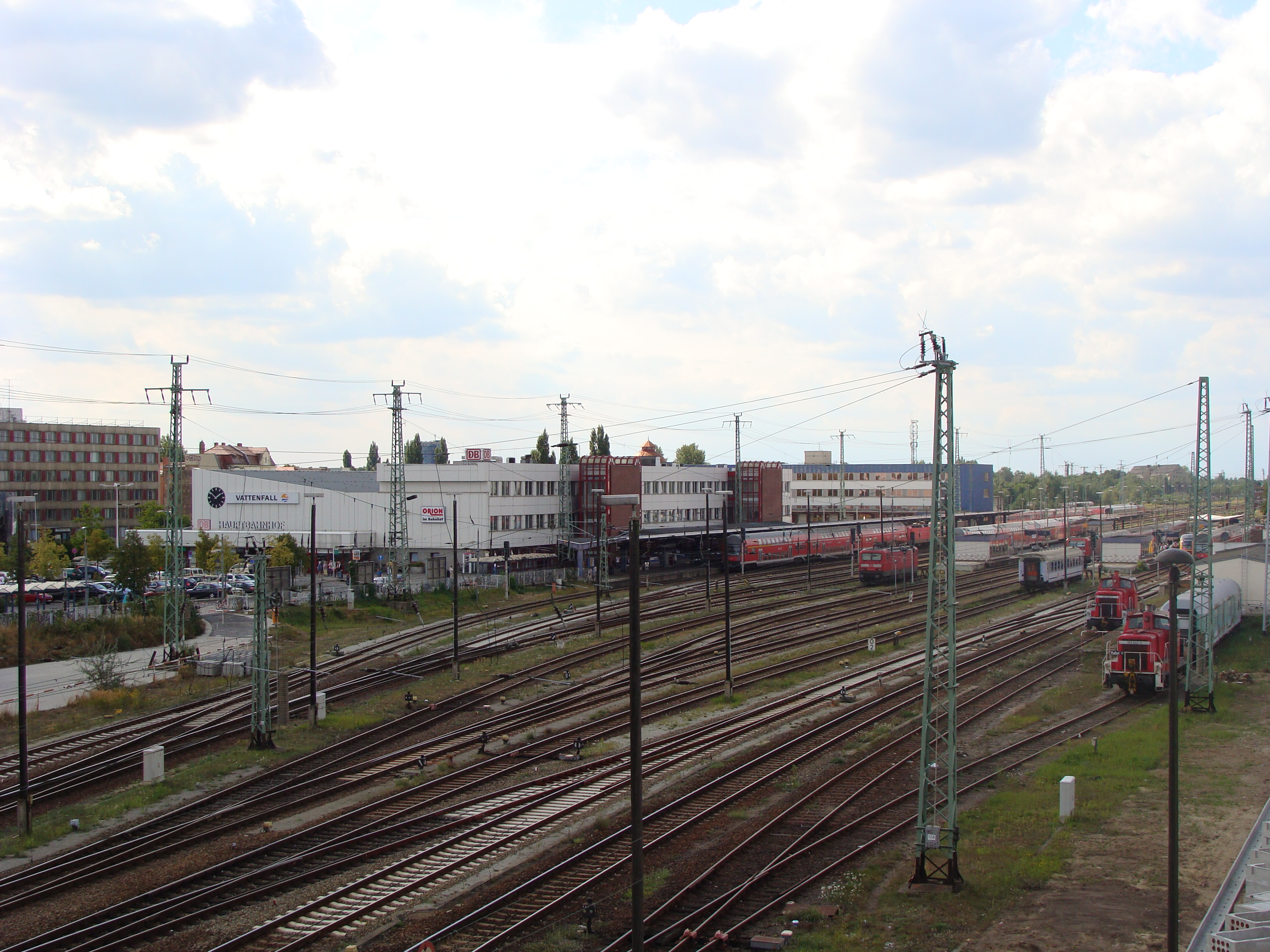
Track field, left of the entrance building (2009)

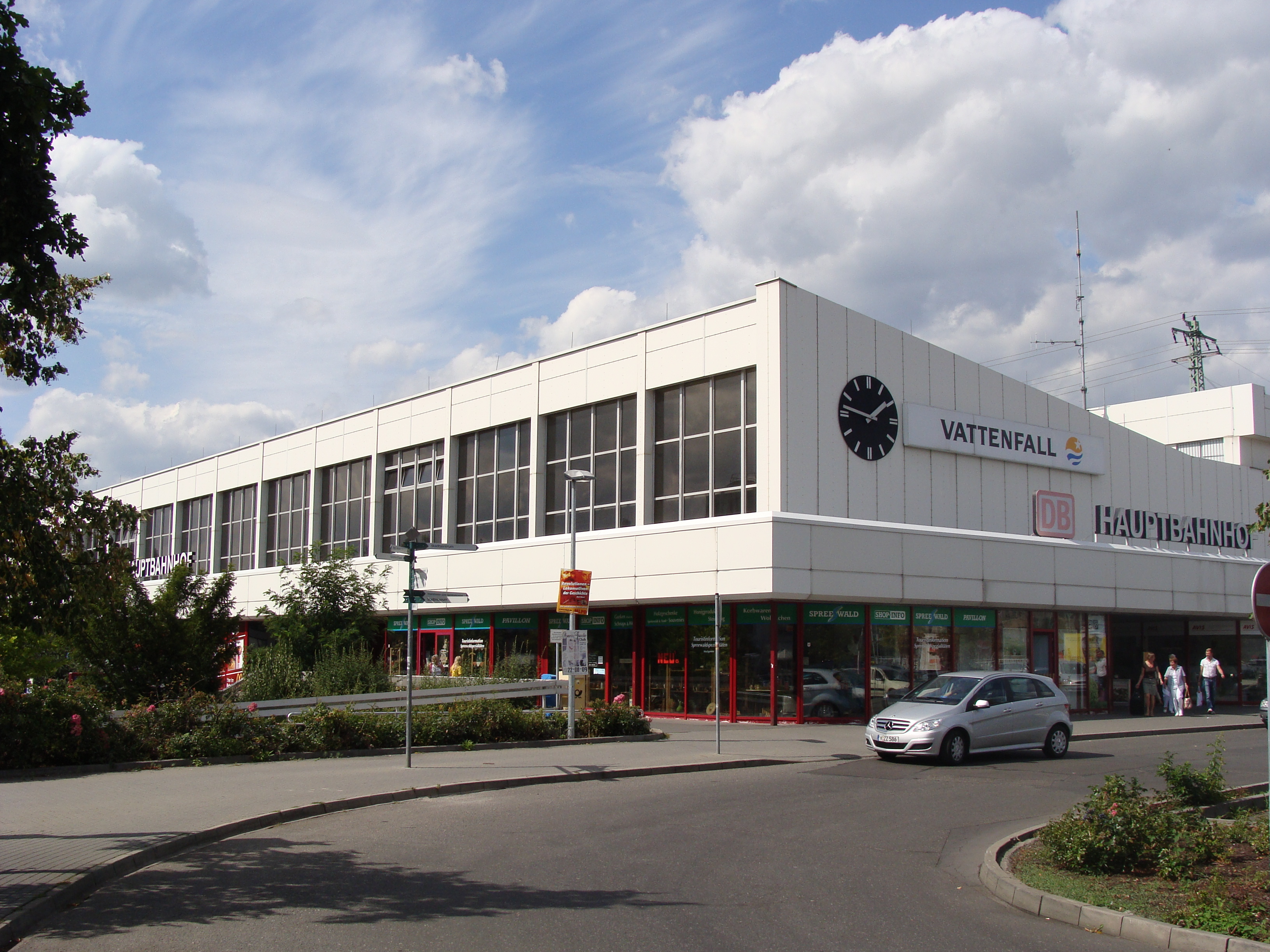
Entrance building (2009)

== Name ==
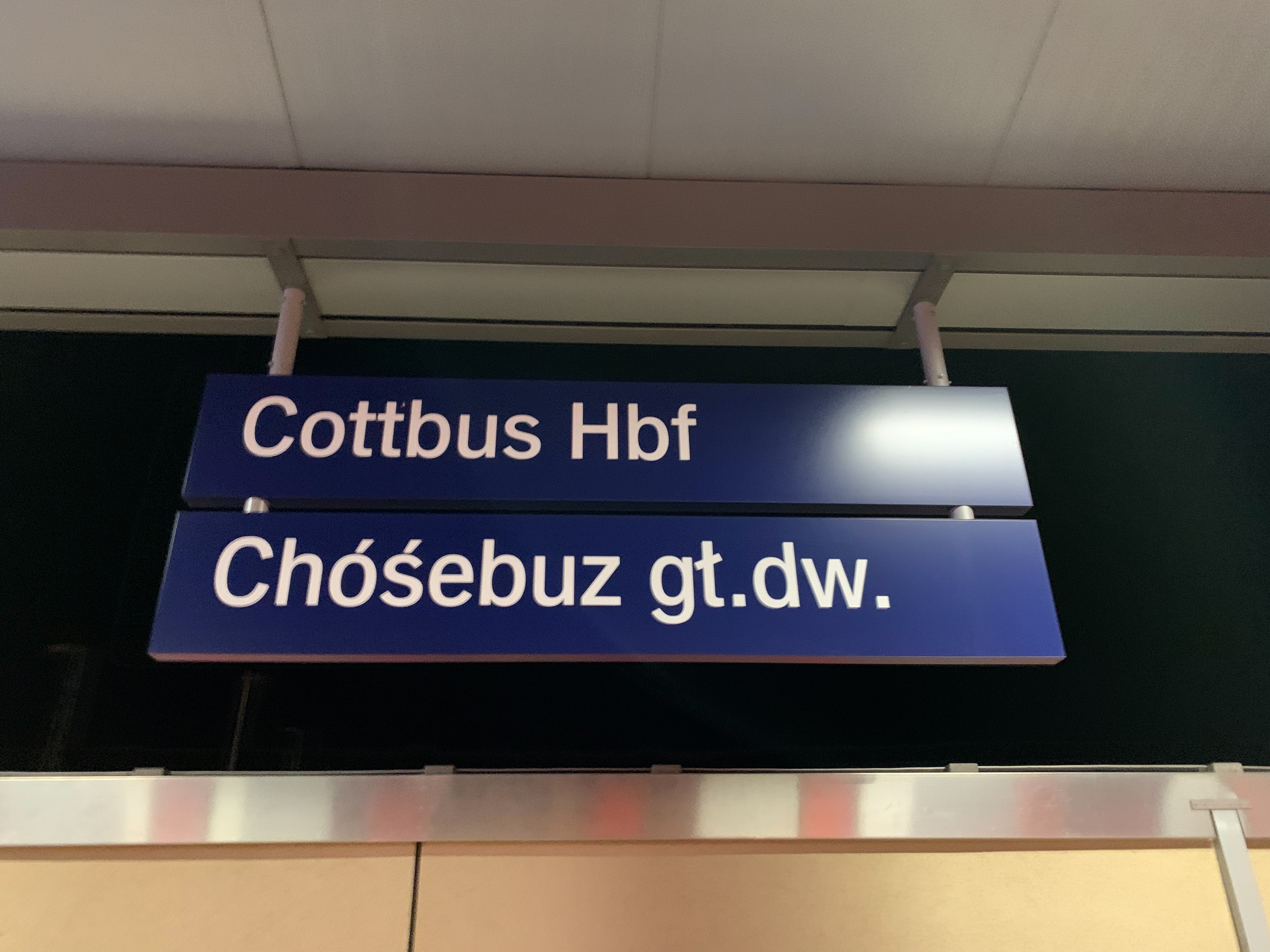
Bilingual sign on platform – German: Cottbus Hauptbahnhof (Hbf), Lower Sorbian: Chóśebuz głowne dwórnišćo (gł.dw.)

Until 2000 the station was the only passenger station in the city, so its name did not need to be distinguished from other stations. Since then, new stations have been built at Cottbus Sandow and the stations now known as Cottbus-Merzdorf and Cottbus-Willmersdorf Nord have had Cottbus added to their names. During the renovation of the main station for the National Garden Show, the name on the outside facade of the station was changed from Bahnhof Cottbus ("Cottbus station") to Cottbus Hauptbahnhof ("Cottbus main station"). Both the Verkehrsverbund Berlin-Brandenburg (Berlin-Brandenburg Transport Association) and the public transit system of Cottbus – Cottbusverkehr – call the station in their timetables Cottbus Hauptbahnhof. Officially the railway station, despite its importance, however, was still not known as Cottbus Hauptbahnhof until late 2018. On 9 December 2018, its name was officially changed to Cottbus Hauptbahnhof.

Cottbus is the capital of the Sorbian people in Lower Lusatia, and platform signage is bilingual in German and Lower Sorbian, reading "Cottbus/Chóśebuz" until 2018, and "Cottbus Hbf"/"Chóśebuz gł.dw." since 2018.

== Rail services ==
The station has lost its former role as a long-distance transport junction. It is served only by one pair of long-distance trains.

In the 2026 timetable the following lines stop at the station:

Line	Route	Interval
IC 56	Cottbus – Berlin – Potsdam – Magdeburg – Hanover – Bremen – Oldenburg → Norddeich Mole | ← Emden Außenhafen	1 train
RE 1	Cottbus – Guben – Eisenhüttenstadt – Frankfurt (Oder) – Berlin – Potsdam – Brandenburg – Magdeburg	Some trains
RE 2	Cottbus – Lübbenau – Lübben – Königs Wusterhausen – Berlin – Berlin-Spandau – Nauen	60 min
RE 7	Cottbus – Lübbenau – Lübben – Königs Wusterhausen – Berlin – Berlin-Wannsee – Potsdam-Rehbrücke – Bad Belzig	Some trains
RE 10	Frankfurt (Oder) – Eisenhüttenstadt – Guben – Cottbus – Calau (Nl) – Doberlug-Kirchhain – Falkenberg (Elster) – Eilenburg – Leipzig	120 min
RE 13	Cottbus – Senftenberg (– Ruhland – Elsterwerda-Biehla – Elsterwerda) (Mon-Fri only)	60 min
RE 18	Cottbus – Senftenberg – Ruhland – Dresden-Neustadt	120 min
RE 20	Berlin Hbf – Potsdamer Platz – Südkreuz – BER Airport – Königs Wusterhausen – Lübbenau (– Vetschau – Cottbus	Some trains
RB 43	Frankfurt (Oder) – Eisenhüttenstadt – Jänschwalde – Cottbus – Calau (Nl) – Doberlug-Kirchhain – Falkenberg (Elster)	120 min
RB 46	Cottbus – Forst	60 min
RB 49	Cottbus – Senftenberg – Ruhland – Elsterwerda-Biehla – Falkenberg (Elster)	120 min
RB 65	Cottbus – Görlitz – Zittau	60 min
RB 92	Cottbus – Guben – Zielona Gora	Sat+Sun individual services
RB 93	Cottbus – Forst – Tuplice – Zary – Zagan	Mon-Fri individual services

Until mid-December 2014 the station was also served by EuroCity "Wawel", which used to run once daily between Hamburg-Altona and Wrocław Główny. This train was reinvented in December 2020 between Berlin Hauptbahnhof and Krakow Główny, but as the train is running on the electrified and faster route via Frankfurt (Oder), it does not stop in Cottbus Hbf anymore.

== Railway station modernisation ==
The station built during the renovation in the 1970s remained in many ways an inadequate station, partly because of its lack of continuous tunnels. Deutsche Bahn is planning the renovation of the station. All tracks and platforms of the passenger station are to be rebuilt and the signalling system is to be modernised. The modernisation is expected to cost almost €100 million.

At the end of 2008, DB Netz was requested by the Federal Railway Authority to demolish large parts of the infrastructure of the former container terminal on the north side of the station. The city of Cottbus plans an extension of Wilhelm-Külz-Straße on the site.

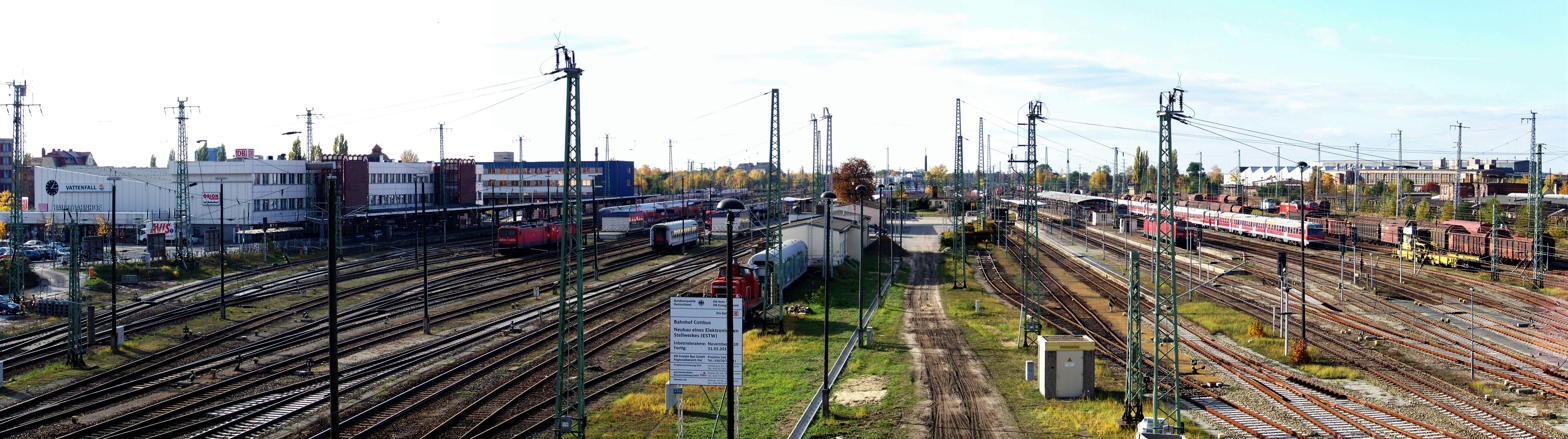
Cottbus station track field (October 2009)

== See also ==
- Rail transport in Germany
- Railway stations in Germany
