= Kolkwitz =

Kolkwitz Gołkojce
- Municipality
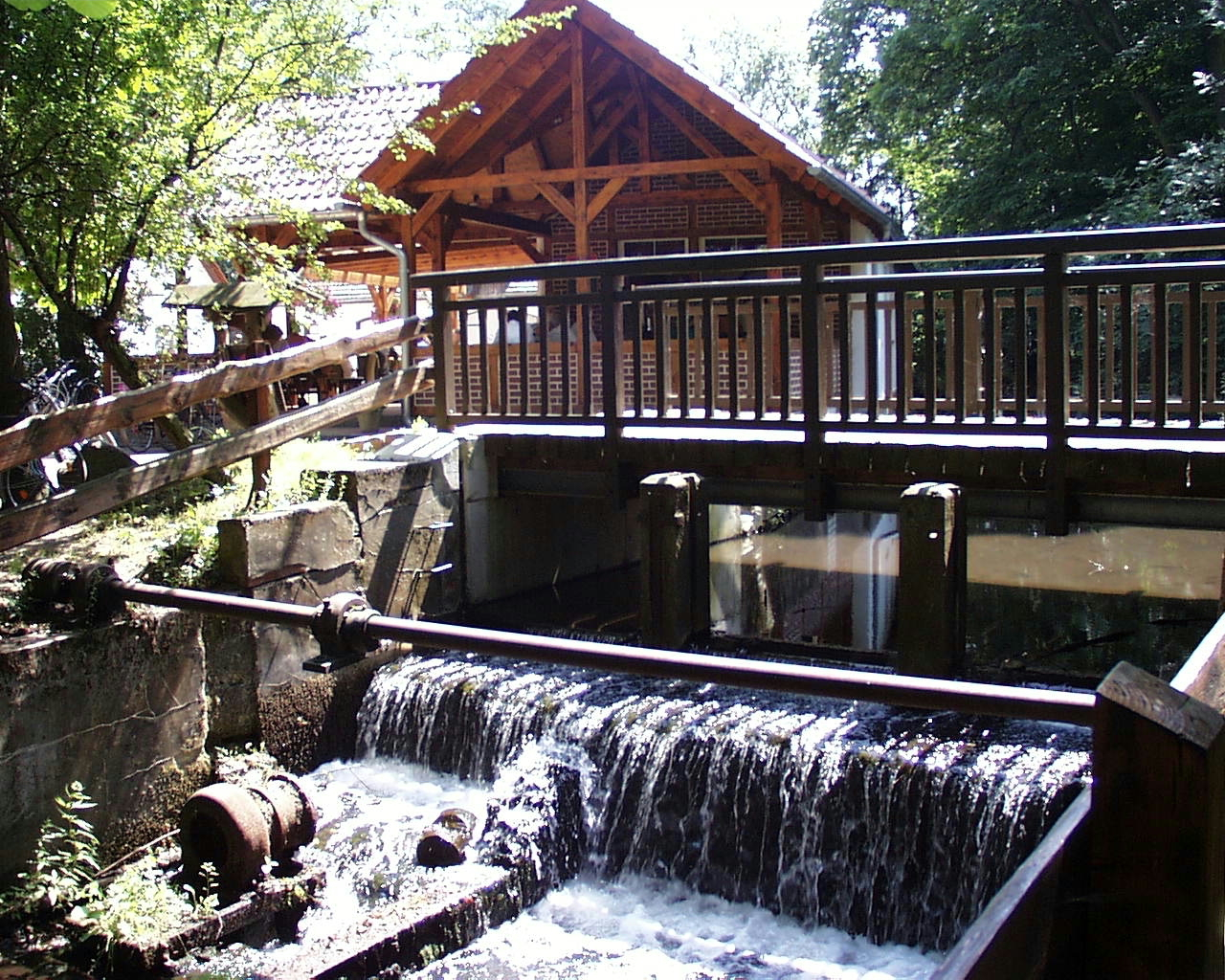
- Popular pub „Koselmühle“, located near Glinzig

- Coat of arms

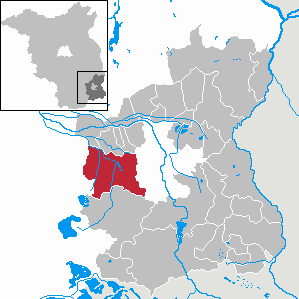
- Location of Kolkwitz within Spree-Neiße district
- Interactive map of Kolkwitz
- Location within Germany Location within Brandenburg
- Coordinates: 51°45′00″N 14°15′00″E
- Country: Germany
- State: Brandenburg
- District: Spree-Neiße

Government
  - Mayor (2017–25): Karsten Schreiber

Area
  - Total: 104.02 km^{2} (40.16 sq mi)
- Elevation: 126 m (413 ft)

Population (2025-12-31)
  - Total: 9,221
  - Density: 88.65/km^{2} (229.6/sq mi)
- Time zone: UTC+01:00 (CET)
  - Summer (DST): UTC+02:00 (CEST)
- Postal codes: 03099
- Dialling codes: 0355, 035603, 035604, 035606
- Vehicle registration: SPN
- Website: www.kolkwitz.de

Kolkwitz (Lower Sorbian Gołkojce) is a municipality in the district of Spree-Neiße, in Lower Lusatia, Brandenburg, Germany.

== Geography ==
Kolkwitz is situated 5 km west of Cottbus. location

This central position makes Kolkwitz a good base for day trips to

- Berlin
- Dresden
- the Spreewald (Lübbenau, Lübben or Burg)
- the "Park of Branitz" (in Cottbus) and Park von Muskau created by famous landscape-gardener Hermann von Pückler-Muskau.
- "Lutherstadt“ Wittenberg – former hometown of Martin Luther.
- Tropical Islands Resort near Lübben
- Poland

== History ==
First documentation concerning Kolkwitz is based in the 13th century.

From 1815 to 1947, Kolkwitz was part of the Prussian Province of Brandenburg.

After World War II, Kolkwitz was incorporated into the State of Brandenburg from 1947 to 1952 and the Bezirk Cottbus of East Germany from 1952 to 1990. Since 1990, Kolkwitz has been part of Brandenburg.

== Demography ==
Development of population since 1875 within the current Boundaries (Blue Line: Population; Dotted Line: Comparison to Population development in Brandenburg state; Grey Background: Time of Nazi Germany; Red Background: Time of communist East Germany)

Recent Population Development and Projections (Population Development before Census 2011 (blue line); Recent Population Development according to the Census in Germany in 2011 (blue bordered line); Official projections for 2005-2030 (yellow line); for 2017-2030 (scarlet line); for 2020-2030 (green line)

Kolkwitz: Population development
within the current boundaries (2020)

Year	Pop.	±% p.a.
1875	5,701	—
1890	6,296	+0.66%
1910	6,880	+0.44%
1925	7,352	+0.44%
1939	8,975	+1.43%
1950	10,521	+1.46%
1964	8,939	−1.16%

Year	Pop.	±% p.a.
1971	8,447	−0.81%
1981	7,831	−0.75%
1985	7,689	−0.46%
1990	7,555	−0.35%
1995	8,622	+2.68%
2000	10,270	+3.56%
2005	9,989	−0.55%

Year	Pop.	±% p.a.
2010	9,542	−0.91%
2015	9,147	−0.84%
2016	9,188	+0.45%
2017	9,189	+0.01%
2018	9,177	−0.13%
2019	9,219	+0.46%
2020	9,269	+0.54%

== Tourism ==
Pictures from Kolkwitz can be found here. Clicking the pictures gives you further information ( German only).

There's a bunker of former airforce of German Democratic Republic (GS-31), which can be visited. website

== Clubs ==
Biggest sportsclub in Kolkwitz is the SV Kolkwitz 1896 e.V. .

Kolkwitzer Carneval Club e. V. (KCC) is known to be one of the most active Carneval Clubs in the region. On 12 December 2019, the Kolkwitzer Carneval Club e.V. was rewarded with a donation of 500 euros for its outstanding club activities by a local energy supplier.

Motorsportclub Hänchen arranges German Open Masterships in Motocross (motorbikes) every year.

Firebrigades (German: „Feuerwehren“) in the different towns of the municipality are a very popular.

More clubs can be found here.

== Towns of the municipality ==
The municipality Kolkwitz exists since the year 1993. It includes the following towns:

- Kolkwitz
- Eichow
- Gulben
- Glinzig
- Hänchen
- Dahlitz
- Papitz
- Limberg
- Krieschow
- Babow/Spreewald
- Brodtkowitz
- Kackrow
- Klein Gaglow
- Zahsow
- Kunersdorf
- Milkersdorf
- Wiesendorf

== Partnership ==
There are partnerships between Kolkwitz and the towns following:

- Großmehring in the Bavarian district Eichstätt (Germany). Partnership established on June 18 and September 24, 1994.
- Torzym in the Lubusz Voivodeship (Poland). Partnership established on June 10, 2006.
