= Wendisch Rietz station =

Railway station in Germany

Wendisch Rietz
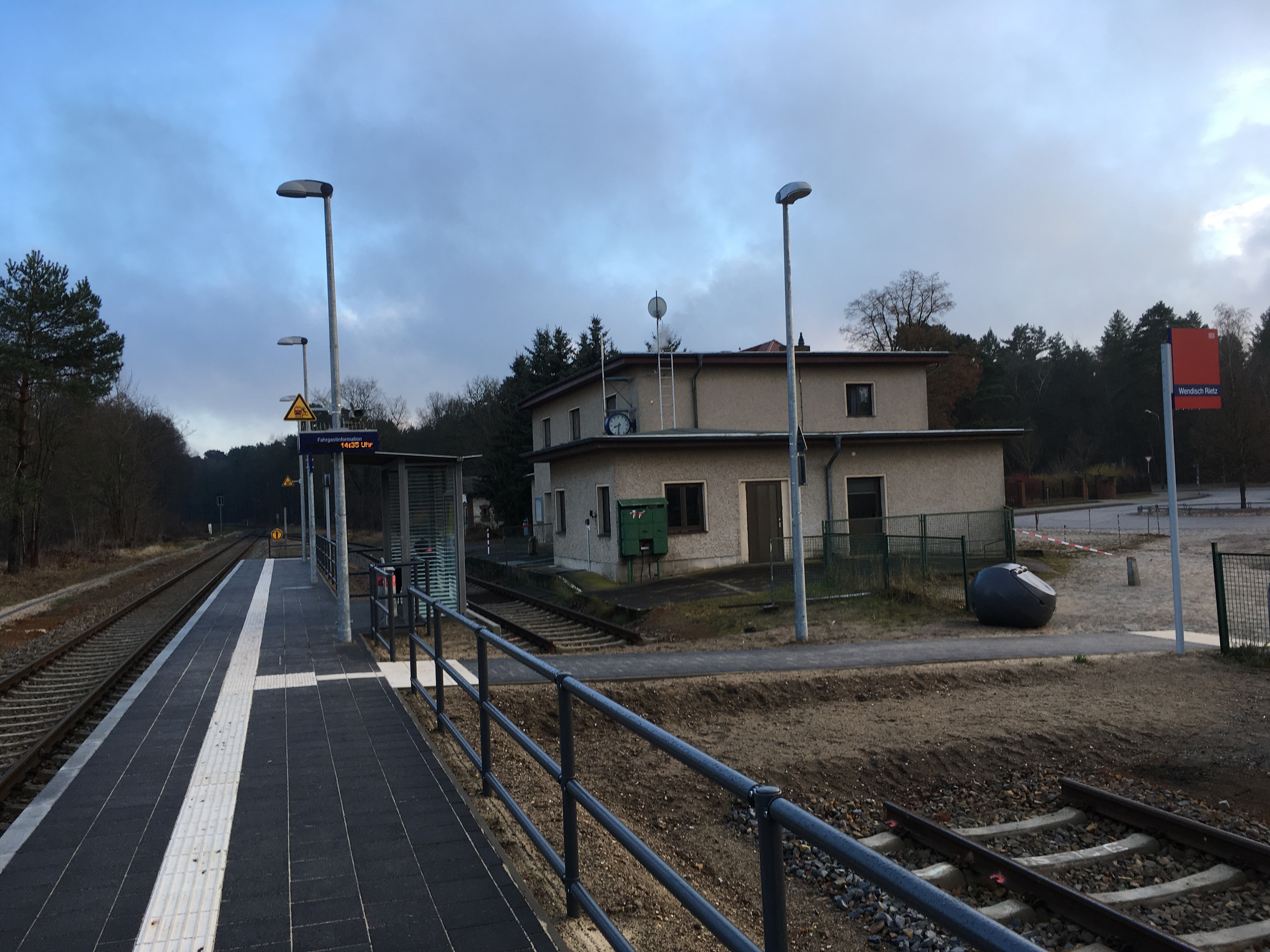
- 2016

General information
- Location: Beeskower Chaussee; 15864 Wendisch Rietz; Brandenburg; Germany
- Coordinates: 52.2067°N 14.0095°E
- Owner: DB Netz
- Operator: DB Station&Service
- Lines: Königs Wusterhausen–Grunow railway (KBS 209.36)
- Platforms: 1 side platform
- Tracks: 1
- Train operators: Niederbarnimer Eisenbahn

Other information
- Station code: 5546
- DS100 code: BSH
- IBNR: 8012855
- Category: 6
- Fare zone: VBB: 6265
- Website: www.bahnhof.de

Services
Preceding station	Niederbarnimer Eisenbahn	Following station
Hubertushöhe towards Königs Wusterhausen	RB 36	Lindenberg (Mark) towards Frankfurt (Oder)
Location
- Location within Brandenburg

Wendisch Rietz station is a railway station in the municipality of Wendisch Rietz, located in the Oder-Spree district in Brandenburg, Germany.
