= Lindenberg (Mark) station =

Railway station in Germany

Lindenberg (Mark)
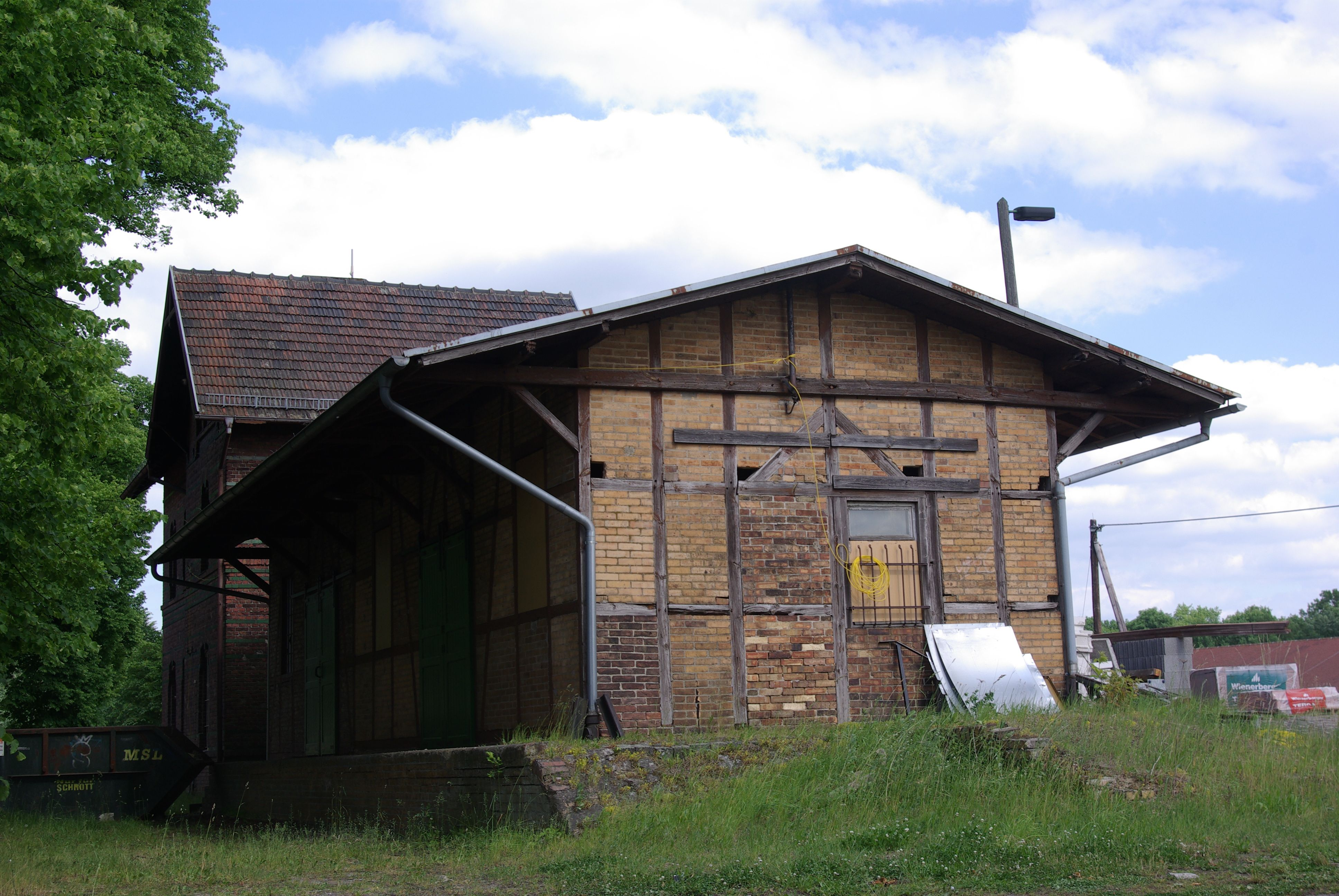
- 2010

General information
- Location: Bahnhofstraße/Hauptstraße; 15848 Tauche; Brandenburg; Germany
- Coordinates: 52.2038°N 14.1118°E
- Owner: DB Netz
- Operator: DB Station&Service
- Lines: Königs Wusterhausen–Grunow railway (KBS 209.36)
- Platforms: 1 side platform
- Tracks: 1
- Train operators: Niederbarnimer Eisenbahn

Other information
- Station code: 3732
- DS100 code: BLNG
- IBNR: 8012237
- Category: 7
- Fare zone: VBB: 6267
- Website: www.bahnhof.de

Services
| Preceding station | Niederbarnimer Eisenbahn | Following station |
|---|---|---|
| Wendisch Rietz towards Königs Wusterhausen | RB 36 | Buckow (bei Beeskow) towards Frankfurt (Oder) |
Location
- Location within Brandenburg

Lindenberg (Mark) station is a railway station in the Lindenberg (Mark) district in the municipality of Tauche, located in the Oder-Spree district in Brandenburg, Germany.
