= Buckow (bei Beeskow) station =

Railway station in Buckow, Germany

Buckow (b Beeskow)
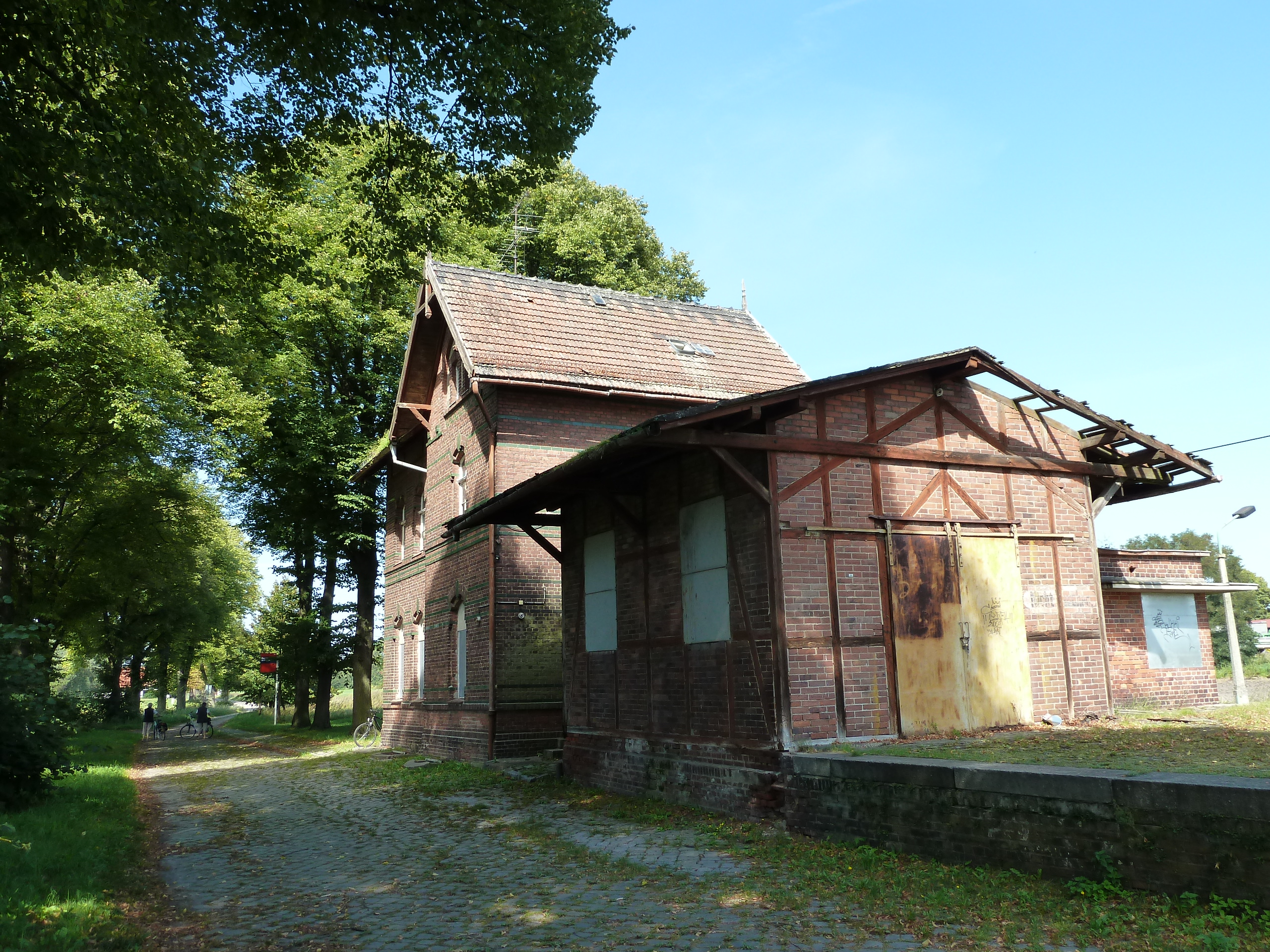
- 2011

General information
- Location: Kolonie 1; 15848 Rietz-Neuendorf; Brandenburg; Germany
- Coordinates: 52.1881°N 14.1694°E
- Owner: DB Netz
- Operator: DB Station&Service
- Lines: Königs Wusterhausen–Grunow railway (KBS 209.36)
- Platforms: 1 side platform
- Tracks: 1
- Train operators: Niederbarnimer Eisenbahn

Other information
- Station code: 949
- DS100 code: BBUW
- IBNR: 8011284
- Category: 7
- Fare zone: VBB: 6268
- Website: www.bahnhof.de

Services
Preceding station	Niederbarnimer Eisenbahn	Following station
Lindenberg (Mark) towards Königs Wusterhausen	RB 36	Beeskow towards Frankfurt (Oder)
Location
- Location within Brandenburg

Buckow (bei Beeskow) station is a railway station in the Buckow district in the municipality of Rietz-Neuendorf, located in the Oder-Spree district in Brandenburg, Germany.
