= Hubertushöhe station =

Railway station in Germany

Hubertushöhe
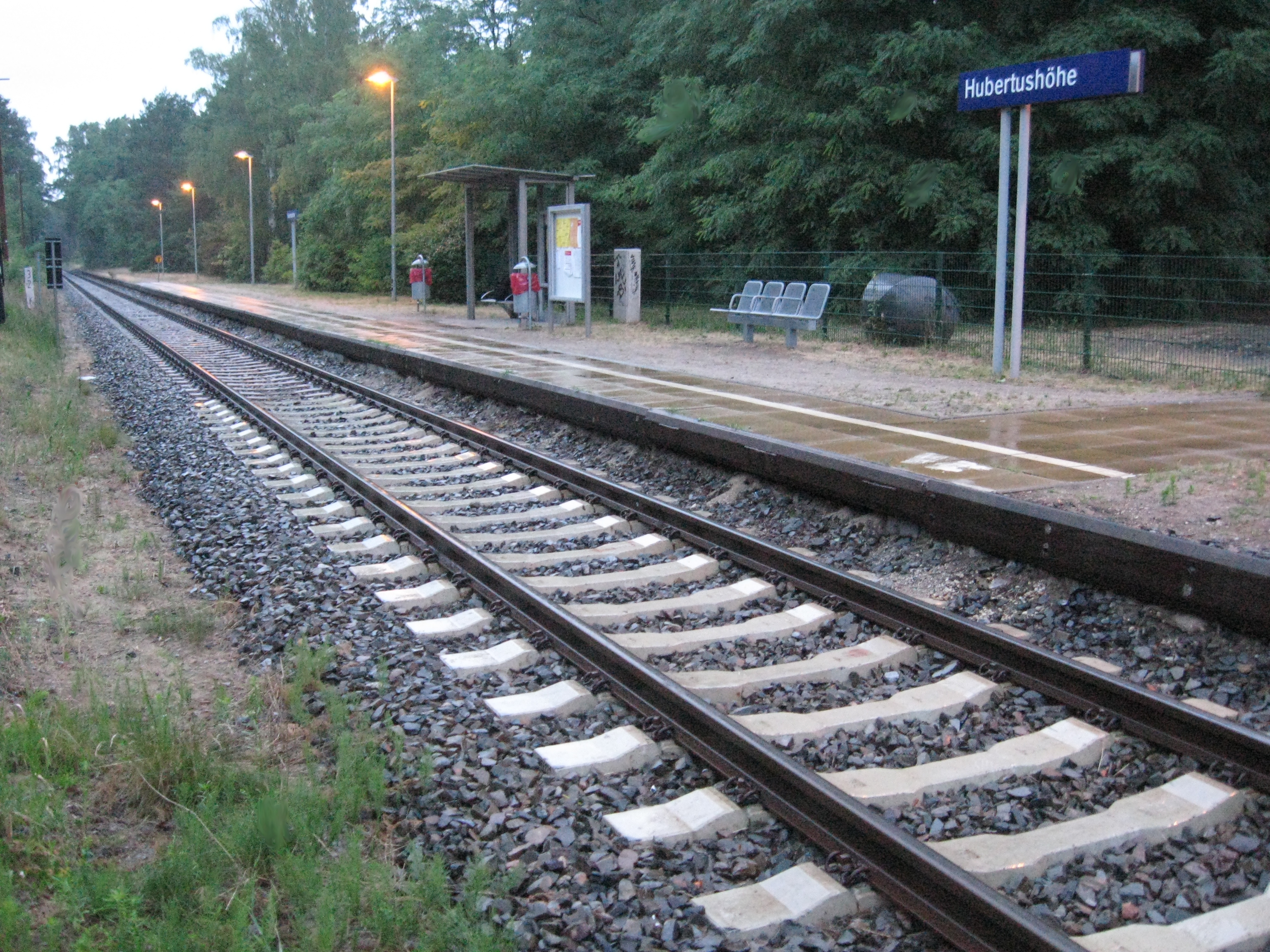
- 2008

General information
- Location: Robert-Koch-Straße; 15859 Storkow (Mark); Brandenburg; Germany
- Coordinates: 52.2340°N 13.9651°E
- Owner: DB Netz
- Operator: DB Station&Service
- Lines: Königs Wusterhausen–Grunow railway (KBS 209.36)
- Platforms: 1 side platform
- Tracks: 1
- Train operators: Niederbarnimer Eisenbahn

Other information
- Station code: 2935
- DS100 code: BHUB
- IBNR: 8011923
- Category: 6
- Fare zone: VBB: 6064
- Website: www.bahnhof.de

Services
Preceding station	Niederbarnimer Eisenbahn	Following station
Storkow (Mark) towards Königs Wusterhausen	RB 36	Wendisch Rietz towards Frankfurt (Oder)
Location
- Location within Brandenburg

Hubertushöhe station is a railway station in the Hubertushöhe district in the municipality of Storkow (Mark), located in the Oder-Spree district in Brandenburg, Germany.
