= Frankfurt (Oder)-Rosengarten station =

Railway station in Frankfurt (Oder), Germany

Frankfurt (Oder) Rosengarten
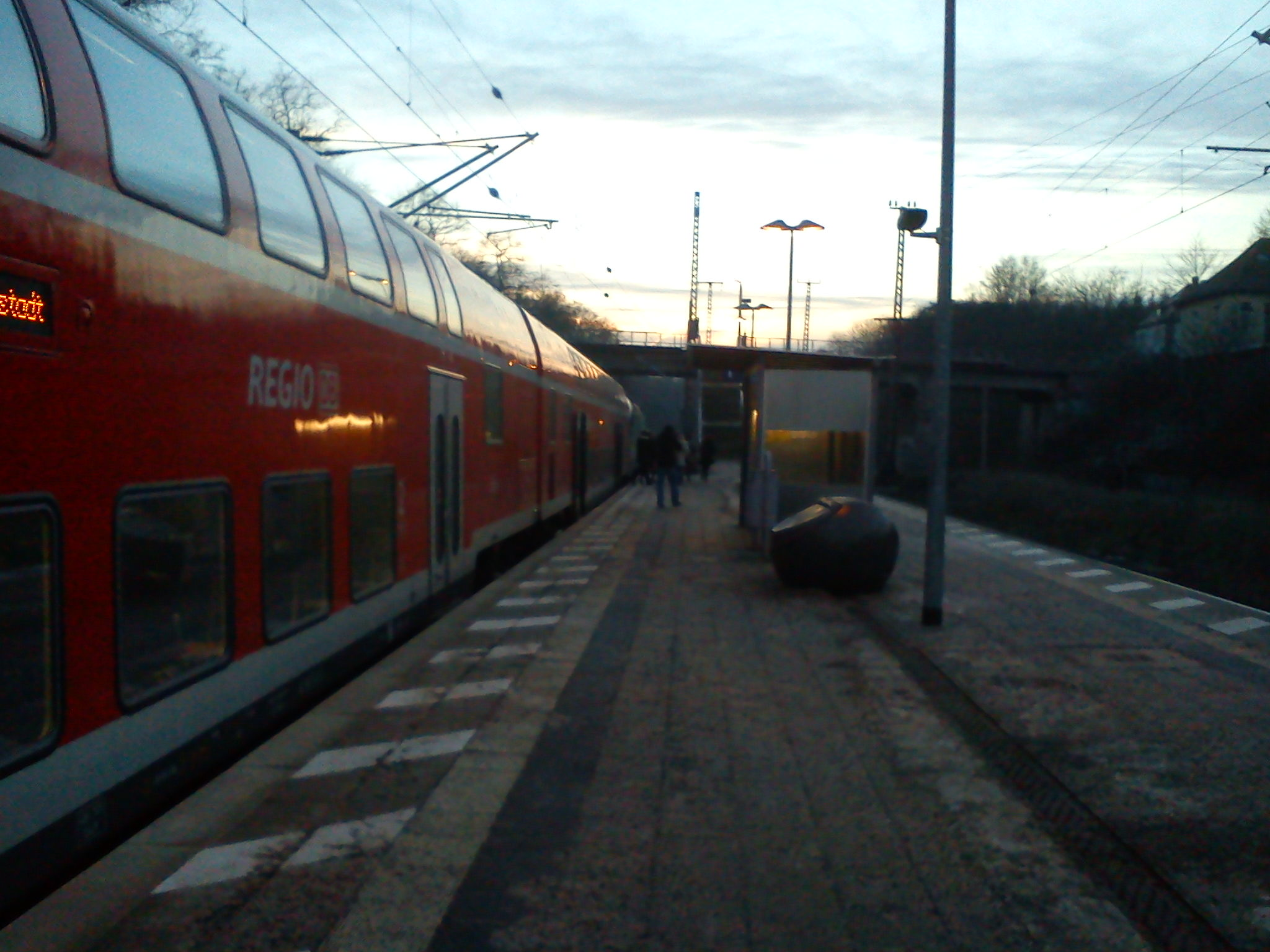
- RE 1 on platform 1

General information
- Location: Hauptstr. 10, Frankfurt (Oder), Brandenburg; Germany
- Coordinates: 52°20′16″N 14°28′21″E
- Line: Berlin–Guben
- Platforms: 2

Construction
- Accessible: Yes

Other information
- Station code: 1862
- DS100 code: BFRS passenger station BFRG freight yard
- IBNR: 8011559
- Category: 6
- Fare zone: VBB: Frankfurt (Oder) B/6073
- Website: www.bahnhof.de

History
- Opened: 1843

Services
Preceding station	Ostdeutsche Eisenbahn	Following station
Pillgram towards Magdeburg Hbf	RE 1	Frankfurt (Oder) towards Cottbus Hbf
Location
- Location within Brandenburg

Frankfurt (Oder)-Rosengarten station is located at kilometre 75.0 of the Berlin–Wrocław railway in Frankfurt (Oder) in the German state of Brandenburg. The station has an island platform, which can be reached from a road bridge. It is served by Regional-Express service RE 1.

== Location and name ==
The station is located in the district of Rosengarten in the city of Frankfurt (Oder) to the west of the urban area. It was built in 1843 as a halt and has since been an important station for the villages lying west of Frankfurt. The station is in a deep cutting just off the main street of Rosengarten, which runs over a bridge from which the central platform of the railway station can be reached by stairs. A line, which ran through the Frankfurt commercial area of Seefichten, located northwest of the centre of the city, ended at the station until 2010. The line had not been in use since about 1990 and was dismantled in 2010.

Autobahn 12 between Berlin and Warsaw runs parallel to the railway near the station. Federal highway 112 runs at right angles to the station between Lebus and Eisenhüttenstadt. The Frankfurt districts of Markendorf and Booßen are accessible from it.

== History ==
During the building of the line from Berlin to Frankfurt (Oder) in 1841/42, the section through the village of Rosengarten created particular difficulties. The line climbs out of the valley of the Spree from the west, reaching its highest point at Rosengarten and then falls rapidly towards the Oder. The original plan of August Leopold Crelle was modified by the head foreman of the construction, Carl-Friedrich Zimpel in the Rosengarten area so that the ridge could be crossed at a lower point. Originally, the line would have run north of the village, instead a southerly course was implemented.

The line was laid in an 11-metre-deep cutting in Rosengarten so that the descent to Frankfurt station would be only 41 metres. The line went into operation on 23 October 1842. Passenger trains between Berlin and Frankfurt did not stop in the Rosengarten. But the 1843 timetable shows stops in Rosengarten for freight trains that also carried passengers. Later Rosengarten became a regular station.

At the beginning of the 20th century plans were developed for a large marshalling yard in Frankfurt. Several options were tested. A location on the main line from Berlin between Rosengarten and Frankfurt was dropped because of the steep slope. Finally, the marshalling yard was built on the line from Eberswalde. A link was built from Rosengarten to provide direct access from Berlin; this line went into operation in 1914. At the same time the cutting was deepened in Rosengarten by eight metres to reduce the gradient of the line further. As a result, there was a series of embankment collapses, the worst of which happened on 27 December 1925. The tracks were closed for several months and a temporary railway had to be built on the northern slope.

During the construction of the link from Rosengarten to the marshalling yard in 1914, the Rosengarten freight yard was operating. There was a connection to an artillery depot until 1922. In 1917, the original Rosengarten halt had been replaced by a more easterly station.

== Infrastructure ==
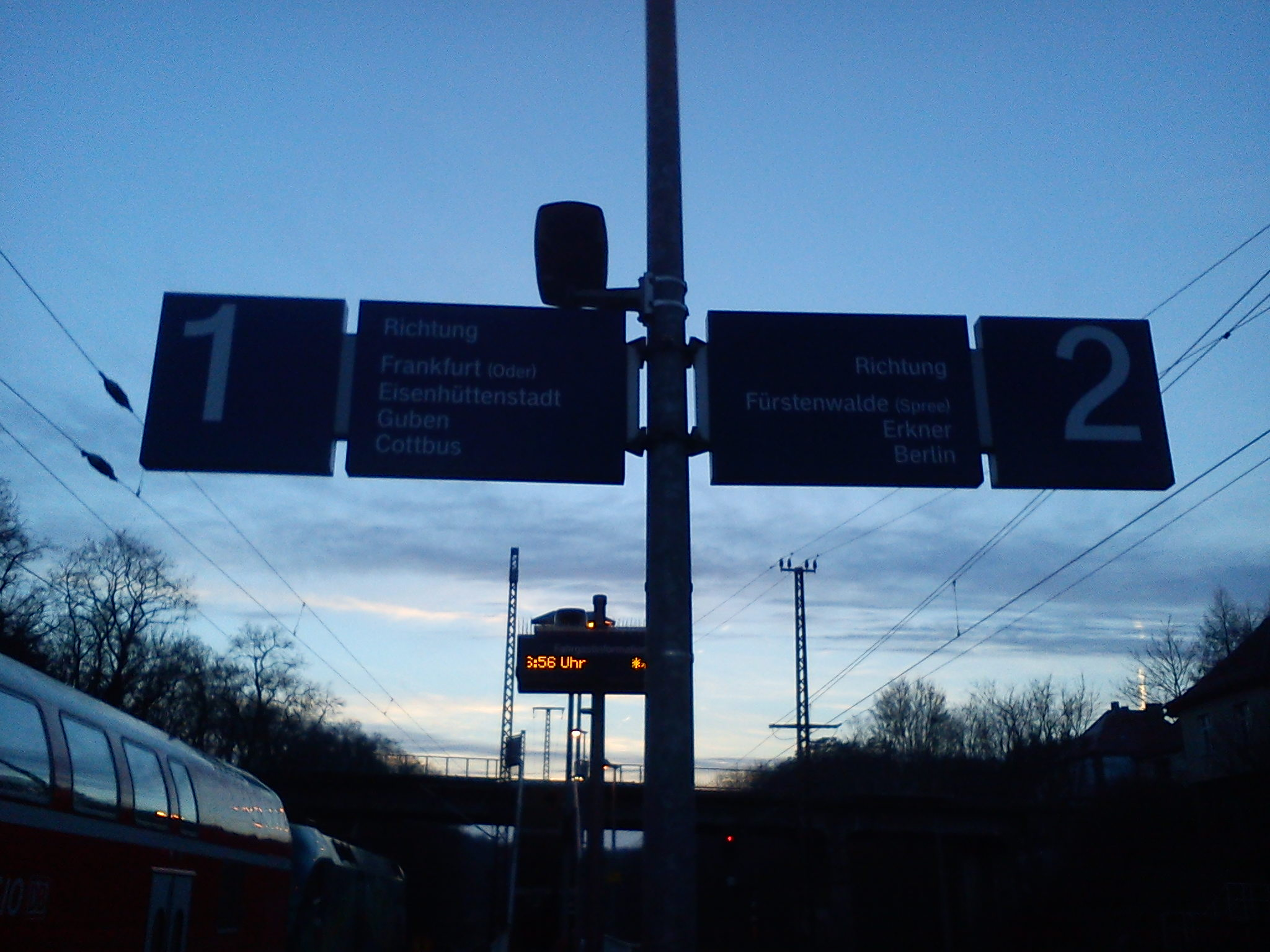
The platform indicator

The passenger station is located in a deep cutting. It has, in addition to the two through tracks on the route to Frankfurt (Oder), two outer tracks leading to the Rosengarten freight yard and continuing to the Frankfurt (Oder) marshalling yard. These tracks are now out of use. Between the two through tracks there is an island platform, which is connected by a staircase at its west end to the road bridge. There used to be a separate pedestrian bridge from the north of the tracks to a station building on the hillside next to the platform. The station building is no longer used for railway purposes and was sold in October 2013. As of 2022, the station and surrounding streets have been closed to allow for the construction of an elevator for easier access, after complaints from prominent residents of Rosengarten.

== Train services ==
Services run hourly from Rosengarten towards Berlin, Potsdam and Magdeburg and towards Frankfurt, continuing in the peak hour to Eisenhüttenstadt. The RE 1 service runs every half-hour in both directions, but it only stops in Rosengarten once an hour.

In the evening and morning individual services of the RB 11, running between Cottbus and Frankfurt, are extended to and from Berlin as the RE 1; these services also stop in Rosengarten.

The station is served by the following service(s):

- Regional services RE 1: Magdeburg – Brandenburg – Potsdam – Berlin – Erkner – Fürstenwalde – Frankfurt (Oder) (– Cottbus)

== Bus services ==
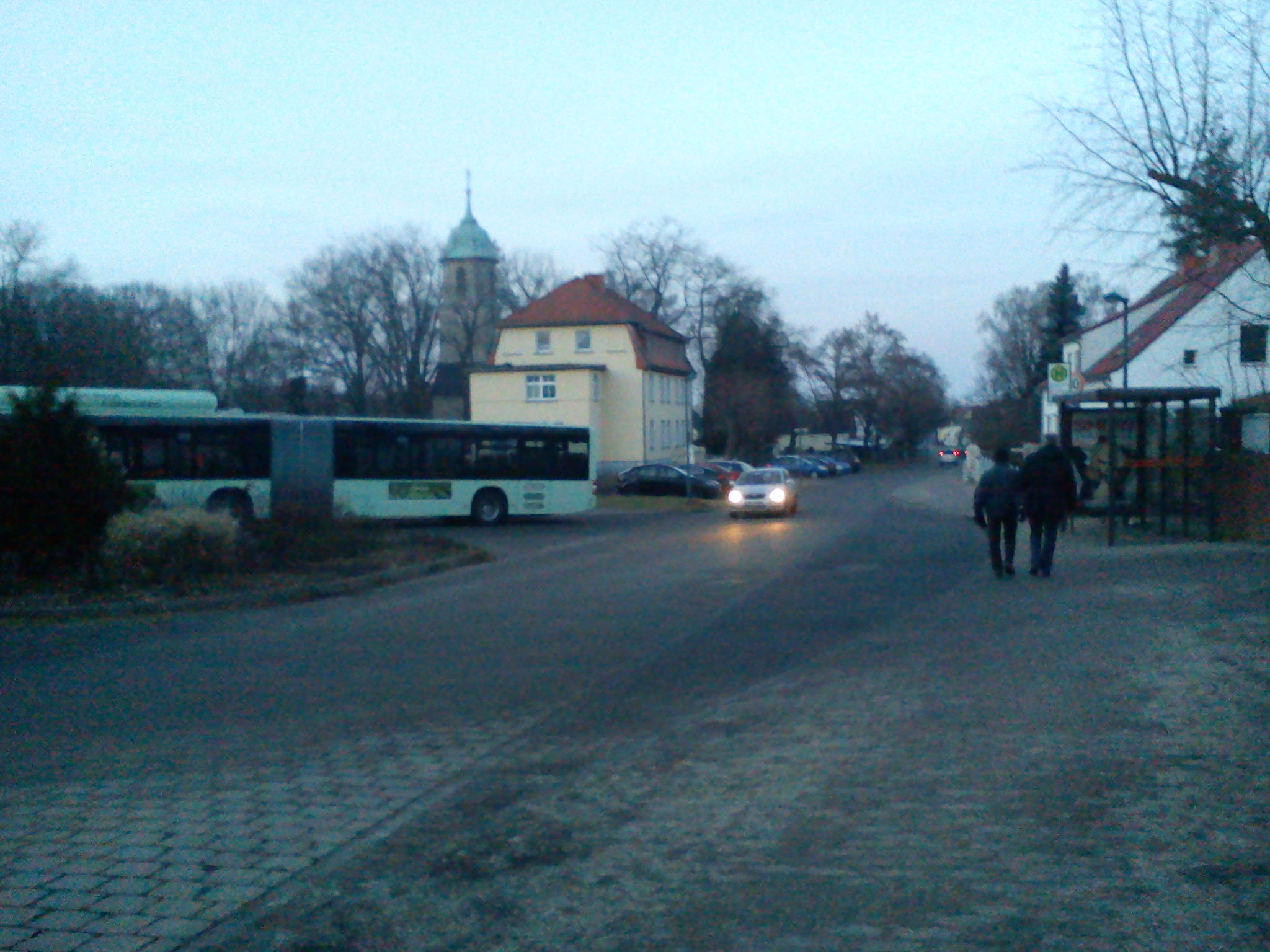
The bus stop

At the station there is a bus stop, which is served by bus routes 980 and 982, operated by Stadtverkehrsgesellschaft Frankfurt (Oder) (the municipal transport authority). Bus route 982 runs from the station to Markendorf. Bus route 980 begins at the station and runs through the centre of Frankfurt to Seefichten. Both lines also stop at the bus station at Frankfurt (Oder) station.
