= Beeskow station =

Railway station in Beeskow, Germany

Beeskow
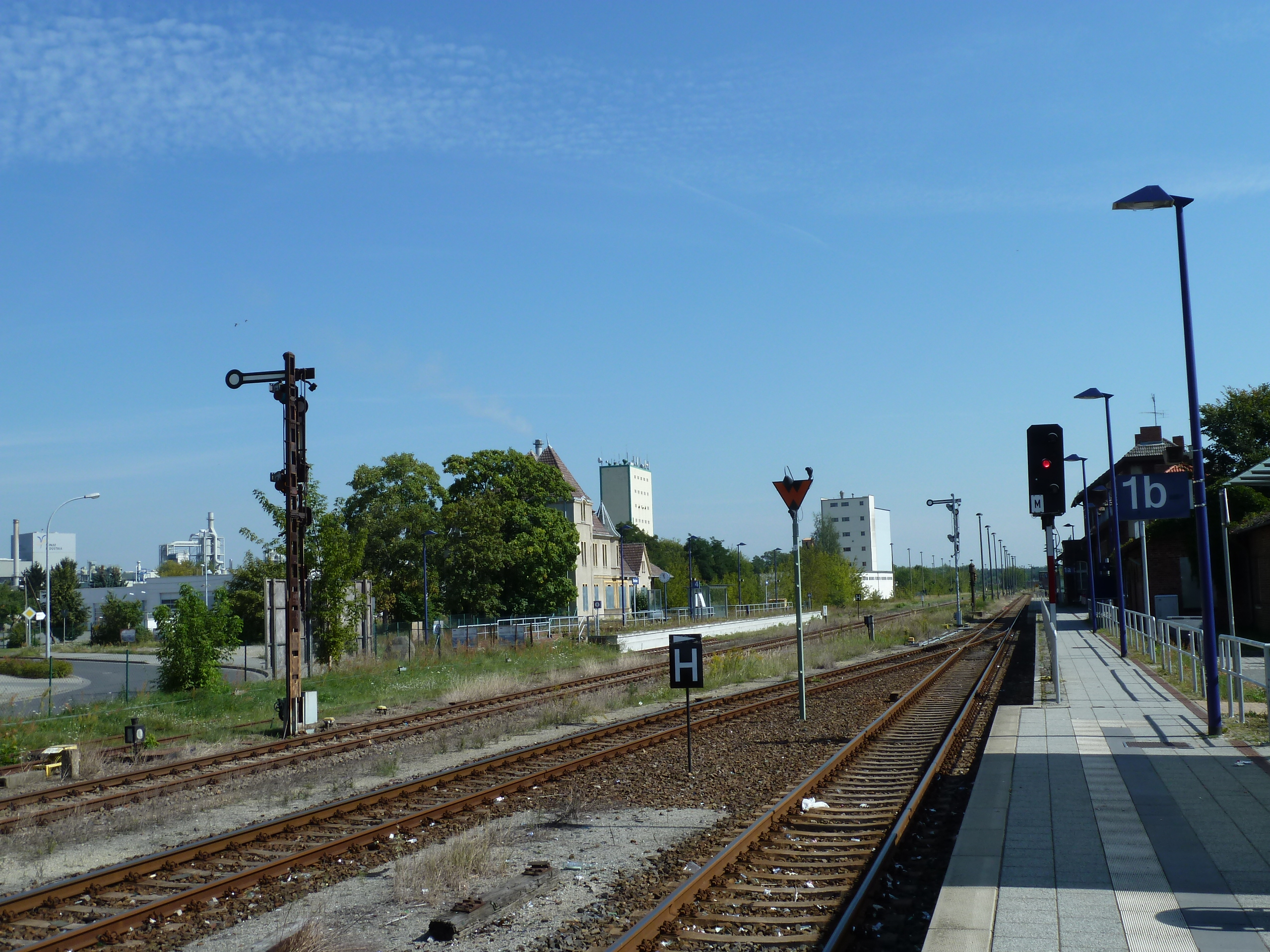
- 2011

General information
- Location: Am Bahnhof 1; 15848 Beeskow; Brandenburg; Germany
- Coordinates: 52.1776°N 14.2510°E
- Owner: DB Netz
- Operator: DB Station&Service
- Lines: Königs Wusterhausen–Grunow railway (KBS 209.36); Fürstenwalde–Beeskow District Railway; Lower Lusitanian Railway
- Platforms: 1 side platform
- Tracks: 2
- Train operators: Niederbarnimer Eisenbahn

Other information
- Station code: 456
- DS100 code: BBES
- IBNR: 8010029
- Category: 6
- Fare zone: : 6369
- Website: www.bahnhof.de

Services
Preceding station	Niederbarnimer Eisenbahn	Following station
Buckow (bei Beeskow) towards Königs Wusterhausen	RB 36	Oegeln towards Frankfurt (Oder)
Location
- Location within Brandenburg

Beeskow station is a railway station in the municipality of Beeskow, located in the Oder-Spree district in Brandenburg, Germany.
