= Frankfurt (Oder) station =

Train station in Brandenburg, Germany

Frankfurt (Oder)
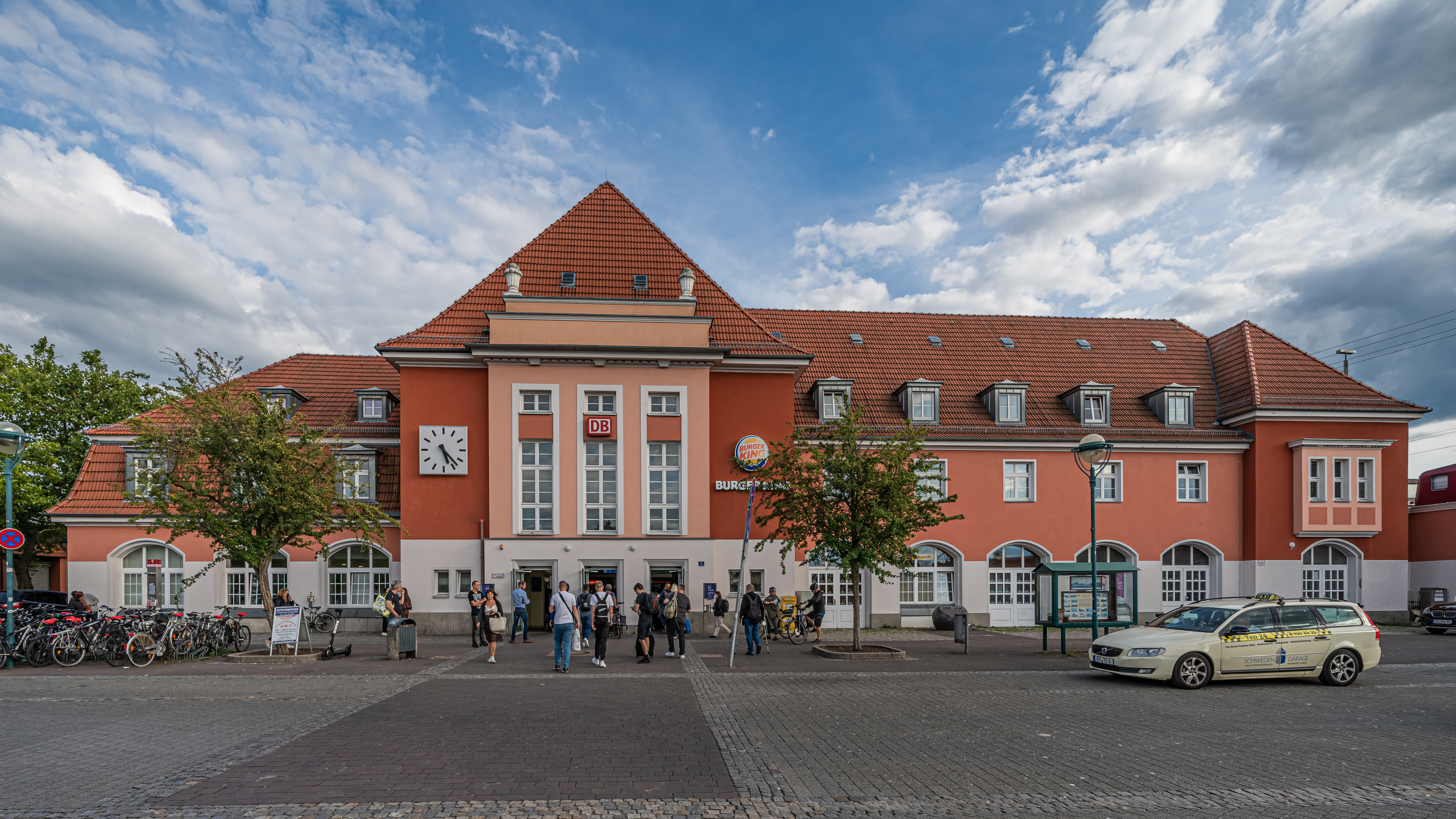
- Entrance building

General information
- Location: Bahnhofsplatz 11, Frankfurt (Oder), Brandenburg; Germany
- Coordinates: 52°20′13″N 14°32′50″E
- Owner: DB InfraGO
- Lines: Berlin–Wrocław; Eberswalde–Frankfurt; Küstrin-Kietz–Frankfurt; Frankfurt–Warsaw; Großenhain–Cottbus–Grunow–Frankfurt
- Platforms: 6
- Train operators: DB Fernverkehr; DB Regio Nordost; Niederbarnimer Eisenbahn

Construction
- Accessible: Yes

Other information
- Station code: 1859
- DS100 code: BFP
- IBNR: 8010113
- Category: 2
- Fare zone: VBB: Frankfurt (Oder) A/5973
- Website: www.bahnhof.de

History
- Opened: 23 September 1842; 183 years ago; 1 September 1846 (altered from terminal to through station); 1923 (current building erected)
- Electrified: 15 December 1990; 35 years ago
Services
Preceding station	DB Fernverkehr	Following station
Berlin Ostbahnhof towards Berlin Hbf	EC 95	Rzepin towards Warszawa Wschodnia or Gdynia Główna
Berlin Ostbahnhof towards Berlin Hbf	EC 96	Rzepin towards Przemyśl Główny
Preceding station	Ostdeutsche Eisenbahn	Following station
Fürstenwalde (Spree) towards Brandenburg Hbf	RE 1	Terminus
Frankfurt (Oder)-Rosengarten towards Magdeburg Hbf	RE 1	Eisenhüttenstadt towards Cottbus Hbf
Preceding station	DB Regio Nordost	Following station
Kraftwerk Finkenheerd towards Leipzig Hbf	RE 10	Terminus
Kraftwerk Finkenheerd towards Herzberg (Elster)	RB 43	Terminus
Preceding station	Niederbarnimer Eisenbahn	Following station
Frankfurt (Oder)-Neuberesinchen towards Königs Wusterhausen	RB 36	Terminus
Seelow (Mark) towards Eberswalde Hbf	RB 60	Terminus
Preceding station	Polregio	Following station
Terminus	RB 91	Słubice towards Zielona Góra Główna
Location

The Frankfurt (Oder) station is the main passenger station in Frankfurt (Oder). It is one of the most important railway stations in the German state of Brandenburg. It is served by regional and long-distance services and since 1945 it has been a border station for transport to and from Poland. The station has been substantially rebuilt several times. A building on the grounds of the first Frankfurt station, north of the current station, is heritage-listed, as are the Kiliansberg apartments, which were built as a railway settlement at the station forecourt, and a monument to railwaymen who fell in the First World War in the same area.

== Location ==
The station is located southwest of the centre of Frankfurt (Oder), which is located above the valley of the Oder; the district of Beresinchen adjoins to the southwest. The oldest line through the station is the line from Berlin via Frankfurt to Guben, which once ran to Wrocław (formerly Breslau, now in Poland). It curves in the area of the station from the west towards the south. The line from the south from Großenhain via Cottbus and Grunow and the line from the north from Eberswalde ends at the station. Another, now dismantled, line ran from Frankfurt to the northeast towards Küstrin-Kietz. The Frankfurt–Warsaw railway, which runs generally to the east, takes a big curve in a southerly direction in Frankfurt to cross the deep Oder valley. The vast and now largely unused property north of the passenger station on the line towards Eberswalde was formerly used for local freight transport operations.

Other operational stations in the city are the border station of Oderbrücke and Rosengarten on the line to Berlin and Neuberesinchen station and Helensee station (which is only served during the warmer months) on the line towards Grunow. Stations that are no longer in operation are Booßen and Klingetal stations on the line to Eberswalde and the Güldendorf station on the line to Guben and the Rosengarten freight yard.

== History ==
The first proposals for the construction of a railway between Berlin and Frankfurt were made in the 1830s. Leopold Crelle was largely responsible for the planning. In addition to the direct route via Fürstenwalde and Jacobsdorf, which was eventually built, there were also proposals for a line to the southeast via Müllrose that would have run into the Oder valley and reached Frankfurt from the south. This would have shortened the line from Berlin to Breslau but caused a significant deviation for traffic to Frankfurt. After discussions were held on the routes, the ground-breaking ceremony for the construction of the line was held on 1 June 1841. The location of the Frankfurt station, however, was not decided until after construction of the line began. It was built as a terminal station on the brickyard hill (Ziegeleiberg) just outside town on the road now called Briesener Straße; a position nearer the town was not possible because of the large height differences. On 23 September 1842, the station was opened with the line between Berlin and Frankfurt.

The Niederschlesisch-Märkische-Eisenbahngesellschaft ("Lower Silesian-Markish Railway Company”, with “Markish” referring to the March of Brandenburg—Mark Brandenburg) was founded in 1842. Its goal was the extension of the line from Frankfurt to Breslau. The company took over the previously independent Berlin–Frankfurt railway on 1 August 1845. The original plans envisaged a branch of the line in Briesen to bypass Frankfurt. After protests from the town, it was decided that the line would continue to run via Frankfurt. It would not be possible to use the existing station on the line to Breslau, as it was built as a terminal station and because the great difference in heights with the Oder valley would not allow a line to be built from it to the southeast.

=== New station building ===
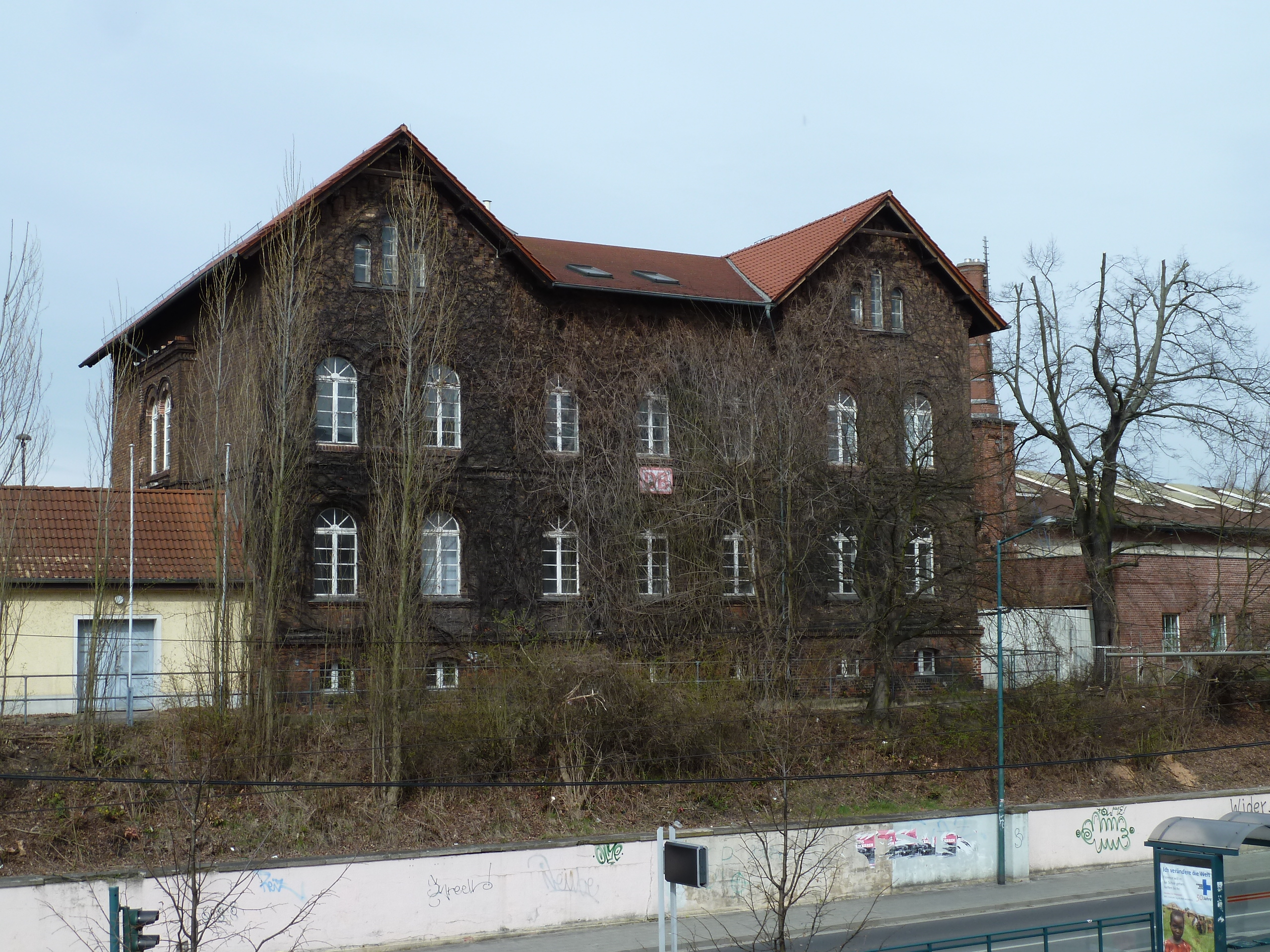
Listed former workshop building of 1855 (Bahnhofstr. 7)

The line was opened to Breslau on 1 September 1846. The new Frankfurt station was a through station in its current situation. On the site of the old station, the Niederschlesisch-Märkische railway company, which was headed by August Wöhler, built its central workshop to replace earlier facilities that were in Berlin and Breslau.

In the following decades, the station was served by several other lines. The Prussian government built the Prussian Eastern Railway (Preußische Ostbahn) to Konigsberg (now Kaliningrad in Russia). The section from Frankfurt via Küstrin (now Kostrzyn nad Odrą in Poland) to Kreuz (Krzyż Wielkopolski) was opened on 12 October 1857. The direct connection from Berlin via Strausberg to Küstrin opened in 1866 and the traffic from the Eastern Railway bypassed Frankfurt.

Frankfurt, which was then an important trade fair city in northeastern Germany, was interested in being near a rail link between the three trade fair cities of Leipzig, Frankfurt on Main and Poznań (then called Posen in German). However, its plan was not successful. The line between Leipzig and Poznań was built via Guben, Frankfurt only received a branch towards Posen via Bentschen (now Zbąszyń). In the construction of this line, difficulties were created by the large difference in height between the Oder valley and rolling hills to the west of Frankfurt. There were suggestions that the line from Poznań would end on the eastern bank of the Oder without connecting with the other lines. Finally, it was decided to build a bridge for the line over the Oder well to the south of the town. The line was opened to traffic on 26 June 1870. The station had to be rebuilt and greatly extended during the construction of the line. The line from Poznań received its own section of the railway station, the (Märkisch-)Posener yard, to the east of the station building. The Eastern Railway had its own marshalling yards north of the station, which was designated by the railways as the Ostbahnhof (east station). Both names have persisted even into the present.

The line from Cottbus via Grunow opened on 31 December 1876 and this was followed on 15 June 1877 by the opening of the line from Eberswalde, operated by Berlin-Stettin Railway Company (Berlin-Stettiner Eisenbahn-Gesellschaft). All railways serving Frankfurt had been nationalised by 1882. The station was connected to the Frankfurt tram network in 1897. Bahnhofstrasse (railway street), which had been on railway property, was acquired by the town of Frankfurt in 1900.

=== Other modifications ===
Even before the First World War construction work began on a large marshalling yard north of the station on the Eberswalde line, which became operational in 1917. The Berlin-Stettin Railway had previously had its freight yard for the line from Eberswalde in this area. The new yard was connected to the line from Rosengarten towards Berlin and had a connection to the line to Küstrin between Booßen and Lebus. A local freight depot was built in this area.

After the First World War, the city of Poznań and most of the neighbouring province was ceded to Poland. The Eisenbahndirektion (railway division) that was formerly based in Poznań was initially transferred to Berlin-Charlottenburg and moved to Frankfurt in 1923 as Reichsbahndirektion Ost (Deutsche Reichsbahn Division East). A variety of railway workers then settled in Frankfurt.

Despite the new freight yard, capacity at the station remained cramped. In the early 1920s it was decided to completely renovate it. A new station building was built east of the old building, which was demolished. The vacant area was used for more tracks. The Märkisch-Posener yard east of the station building was demolished. The station forecourt was lowered during the upgrade by four metres, so that the station could be connected with the platform tunnel and the tunnel could be connected to the north of the station building to Beresinchen without large height differences.

In 1930, the main workshop at the station was closed and the area was used for other railway facilities.

=== After the Second World War ===
The city, the region and the railway were exposed to violent destruction at the end of the war. For eleven weeks, the city was the scene of heavy fighting between the German Wehrmacht and the Red Army. Soviet troops occupied the city on 23 April 1945. Two days later, construction began of a temporary bridge to replace the bridge over the Oder that had been demolished by retreating Wehrmacht troops. One track had already been converted to broad gauge as far as the Oder and a broad gauge track was extended from Frankfurt to Berlin in May 1945. Some station tracks were converted. Rail traffic resumed only gradually. As a result of the shift of the border to the Oder–Neisse line, which was specified in the Potsdam Agreement, the city became a border town. In the following decades, the station became the most important border station between the German Democratic Republic to the east.

The section of the line to Küstrin between Frankfurt and Wüste Kunersdorf junction near Lebus was dismantled as war reparations to the Soviet Union and never rebuilt. Traffic on this line was then operated exclusively via the link from Booßen. The new border reduced the importance of this line and it was reclassified as a secondary line.

Oderbrücke (Oder bridge) station was built on the west bank of the Oder for the clearance of heavy freight traffic towards Poland.

Although freight was handled mainly at the freight yard, the passenger station was affected by this traffic, since all traffic from Berlin and from the yard to Poland and to the south had to pass through the passenger station. Over several decades there have been plans to build a southern connection curve to relieve the station. The curve would connect the Oderbrücke station directly with the line to Eisenhüttenstadt so that the coal and ore traffic would no longer have to pass through the Frankfurt station to the marshalling yard and then pass back through the passenger station. This proposal was met with protests from the town's citizens. In 1984, the land route was abandoned due to the political situation in Poland. The Mukran–Klaipėda ferry was established to the Soviet Union and the construction of the curve was finally abandoned.

The line across the border to Oderbrücke station was electrified on the Polish side in 1988.

=== Development since 1990 ===
A new signalling centre went into operation at Finkenheerder Straße south of the platforms on 22 November 1990. It replaced five decentralised signal boxes. Electrification of the lines towards Berlin and Cottbus via Guben and to the Oder bridge was completed on 15 December 1990.

Traffic was abandoned from Frankfurt to Küstrin in 1996 and the line was closed shortly afterwards. The section from Grunow to Cottbus was also closed; a remnant of this line from Frankfurt to Grunow is still used by trains towards Beeskow and Königs Wusterhausen.

The station forecourt and the passenger facilities at the station were remodelled from 1998 to 2003. The station building was renovated and a platform was removed.

With the accession of Poland to the European Union and later to the Schengen Agreement, the station lost most of its role as a border station. For some trains, it is still a stop for changing locomotives. The trains of the Berlin-Warszawa-Express are now operated with multi-system locomotives that can use both the German and the Polish electrical supply.

=== Passenger services ===
The Berlin–Frankfurt–Guben–Breslau route was one of the most important long-distance routes in Germany until World War II. A variety of express trains served this route and, with the exception of a short-term through express train in the 1930s, all stopped in Frankfurt. Some of the trains continued beyond Breslau, to Vienna or Budapest among other places.

Another important long-distance route was from Berlin via Frankfurt to Poznań. For several decades until the mid-1920s, trains ran to Warsaw via Toruń as there was a continuous connection over the then recently completed Warsaw–Poznań railway. Since the mid-1920s was there has been a direct connection to Warsaw with the extension of the line from Frankfurt, so that since then traffic has run from Berlin to Warsaw through Frankfurt.

Between the world wars, some express trains ran between Stettin (Szczecin) and Breslau via Küstrin and Frankfurt. From 1926 until the Second World War, frequent suburban service ran to the extensive facilities of the marshalling yard. Up to 18 trains a day ran between Frankfurt and Booßen. The stations of Paulinenhof, Simonsmühle and Gronenfelde were built in the area of the marshalling yard. Gronenfelde was later called Frankfurt-Klingetal and was served by trains to Eberswalde and Kostrzyn until 1995/1996.

==== Between 1945 and 1990 ====
After 1945, Frankfurt (Oder) was the border station for long-distance trains from Berlin to Poland. Only freight trains crossed the border at Küstrin and Guben. The crossing in Guben on the line to Wrocław was closed for normal traffic and was only used for military traffic. The long-distance services from Berlin to Poland and the Soviet Union went through Frankfurt, the new Polish border station of Kunowice and the junction at Rzepin. Traffic increased constantly up to 1980. Only a small proportion of these trains were available for domestic traffic in East Germany (the GDR) between Berlin and Frankfurt. It was also not possible to board through trains to the Federal Republic of Germany in Frankfurt.

During the existence of the GDR, some express trains ran in the north–south direction from Angermünde and Frankfurt and continued towards Dresden. In the summer months, some seasonal trains ran between Stralsund or Wolgast and Zittau. For several decades there was a direct inter-zone train (Interzonenzug, that is a train between East and West Germany that did not serve domestic traffic in East Germany) between Frankfurt (Oder) and Frankfurt (Main) via Cottbus and Leipzig.

Berlin remained the main destination for regional transport from Frankfurt, but due to capacity constraints in the Berlin area only a few trains ran directly to Berlin and most terminated in Erkner, where an S-Bahn service connected with the city. Some semi-fast passenger services went directly to Berlin-Karlshorst, some continuing to Berlin Ostbahnhof, and stopped on the route only at Fürstenwalde or at a few other stations.

A special feature for two decades was the operation of long-distance passenger trains. One of these train pairs ran daily from Frankfurt via Eberswalde, Fürstenberg (Havel), Neustrelitz and Güstrow to Schwerin. The other went via Erkner, Berlin Schönefeld Airport, Zossen, Wunsdorf and Zossen again to Jüterbog; up to the 1970s, it continued via Potsdam and Brandenburg to Magdeburg. These services–including one train pair between Frankfurt and Dresden–had special carriages for members of the Soviet army.

==== After 1990 ====
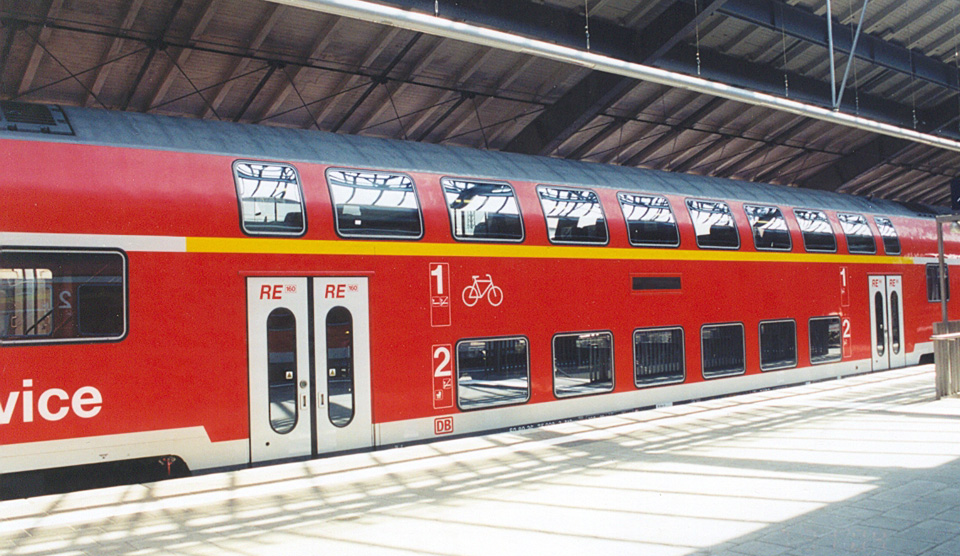
Regional-Express in the train shed in Frankfurt (Oder)

The long-distance services to Cottbus were abandoned in the second half of the 1990s. A through D-Zug express service ran from Halberstadt via Magdeburg and Berlin to Frankfurt from 1991 to 1993. Since then the only long-distance trains have been trains running towards Poland. Most local trains have run towards Berlin at hourly intervals since 1993; these trains became Regional-Express (RE) services in 1994. Since 1998, the RE services have operated at approximately half-hour intervals between Frankfurt and Berlin, some continuing to Potsdam, Brandenburg and Magdeburg. Regular interval services were also introduced on the other routes into Frankfurt in the mid-1990s. This was partly associated with the closure of stations on the line, especially on the line towards Eberswalde.

Local services have run towards Poland since the mid-1990s, but there are only three pairs of trains a day.

== Train services ==
The station is served by the following services:

Line	Route	Frequency (min)	Operator
EC 95; PKP: EIC	Berlin-Warszawa-Express: Berlin Hbf – Frankfurt (Oder) – Poznań – Warszawa Centralna	Four train pairs daily	DB Fernverkehr, PKP Intercity
EC 95; PKP: IC	Gedania: Berlin Hbf – Frankfurt (Oder) – Poznań – Gdynia Głowna	One train per day	DB Fernverkehr, PKP Intercity
EC 96; PKP: IC	Wawel: Berlin Hbf – Frankfurt (Oder) – Wrocław – Katowice – Kraków – Rzeszów – Przemyśl	One train per day	DB Fernverkehr, PKP Intercity
RE 1	(Cottbus – Guben – Eisenhüttenstadt –) Frankfurt (Oder) – Fürstenwalde (Spree) – Berlin Hbf – Potsdam Hbf – Brandenburg Hbf – Genthin – Magdeburg Hbf	30 (Frankfurt – Brandenburg); 60 (Brandenburg – Magdeburg) individual services (Frankfurt – Cottbus)	Ostdeutsche Eisenbahn
RE 10	Frankfurt (Oder) – Eisenhüttenstadt – Guben – Cottbus – Calau (Nl) – Doberlug-Kirchhain – Falkenberg (Elster) – Eilenburg – Leipzig	120	Ostdeutsche Eisenbahn
RB 43	Cottbus – Guben – Eisenhüttenstadt – Frankfurt (Oder)	60	DB Regio Nordost
RB 36	Frankfurt (Oder) – Beeskow – Königs Wusterhausen	60 (Mon–Fri); 120 (Sat/Sun)	Niederbarnimer Eisenbahn
RB 60	Frankfurt (Oder) – Wriezen – Eberswalde	120	Niederbarnimer Eisenbahn
RB 91	Frankfurt (Oder) – Rzepin – Zielona Gora Główna	Individual services	Polregio, DB Regio Nordost

== Infrastructure ==
The first Frankfurt train station was a built is a terminal station with one platform for departures and arrivals and stabling for passenger traffic. The station building was on the north side of the tracks. At the end of the platform on the east side of the station there was a shed for wagons, locomotives and freight and a mail handling facility. After the construction of the through station workshop facilities were built on the site. The mail handling facility became a residence for rail officials and the passenger station building was used for administrative purposes. It was destroyed in an air raid in 1945. One of the buildings (Bahnhofstrasse 7) built as a workshop in the mid-1850s has been preserved and is a listed building.

=== First through station ===
The through line running from Berlin to Breslau (Wrocław) was built on a curve to the right towards the south in the station area. The new station was built on the curve. The station building was built from 1846 under the direction of the construction director of the Lower Silesian-Markish Railway, construction inspector Henz. It was very similar to the station buildings in Görlitz and Kohlfurt (now Węgliniec), which were built around the same time. The form and details of the facades of the crenelated, neo-renaissance structure with arched windows and cornices with coupled small arched windows in the mezzanine marks the common origin of these buildings, only the towers at the ends of the buildings were not also built here. On the town side of the station there was a freight shed and an engine shed and other facilities were built for the maintenance of rail vehicles on the opposite side. While the line of the Prussian Eastern Railway could be connected with this station, the facilities were not sufficient for the line opened to Posen (Poznań) in 1870. A new section of the station was built for the Markish-Posen Railway, the Posener Hof, on the east side of the station using the old freight facilities of the Lower Silesian-Markish Railway. A new freight shed, which was also used by the Eastern Railway, was built on the other side of the station. The marshalling yards of the Eastern Railway were built to the north of the so-called Ostbahnhof section of the station. The freight station of the Berlin-Stettin Railway was built further north of the city on the site of the later local freight yard on the southern edge of the marshalling yard.

=== Today's station ===
The current station is mainly the result of the redevelopment of the station in the early 1920s. The station building was built by Deutsche Reichsbahn director Beringer from 1923. With its Baroque Revival style it has been described as "one of the last eclectic station buildings” before the adoption of new architectural styles. A platform hall was built on platforms 3 and 4 and several smaller buildings were built perpendicular to the station building with the raising of the level of the tracks in 1926. Access to the railway station and from there to the platform tunnel is at ground level; the pedestrian tunnel does not continue from the platforms towards Beresinchen. The station has three island platforms. Another platform, the original platform 1, was next to the entrance building, but it was removed during the renovation of the station up to 1990.

=== Station area ===
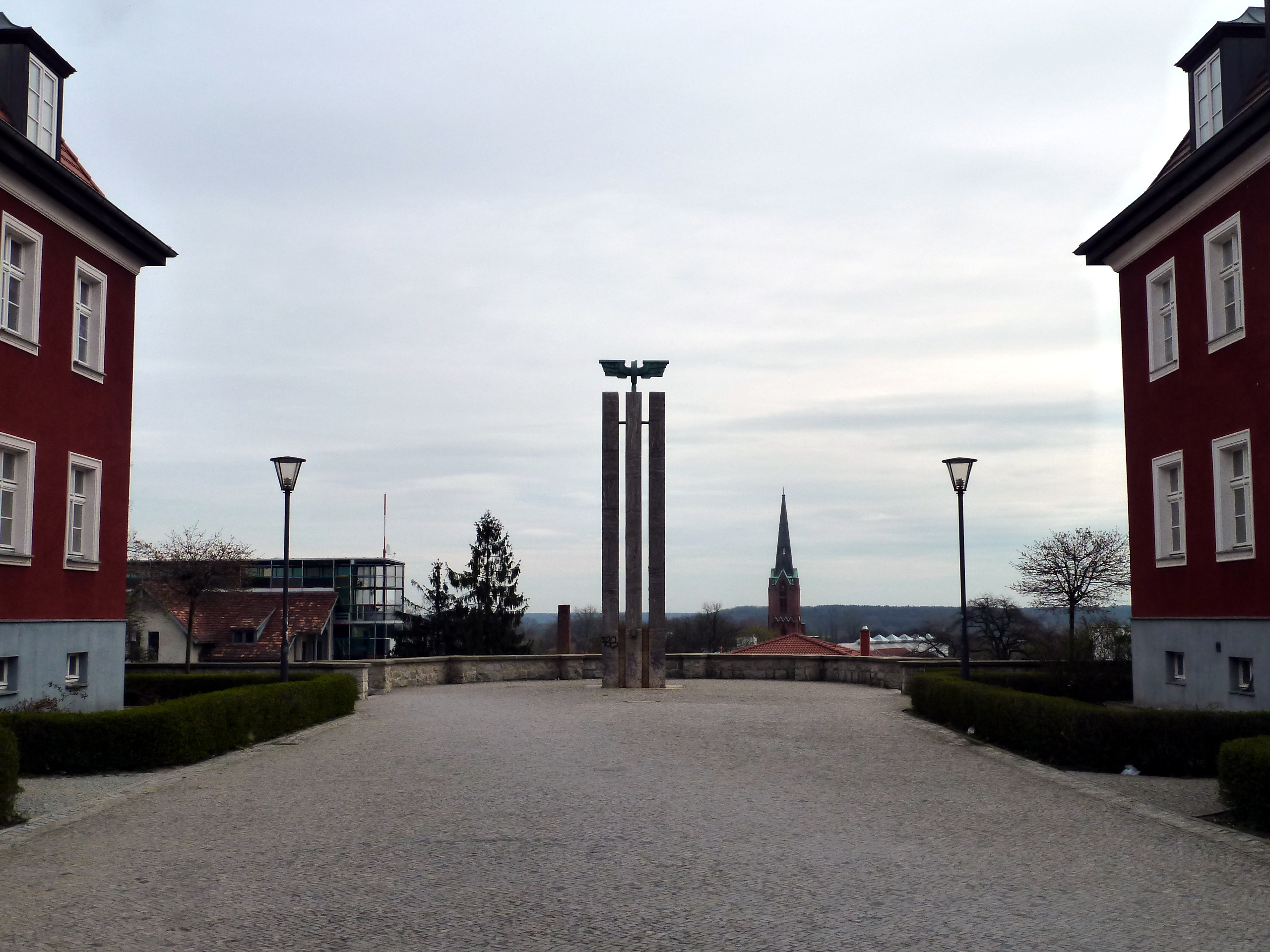
Railway monument in the Kiliansberg settlement on the station forecourt. The settlement and monument are heritage-listed

The bus station is located on the station forecourt in front of the entrance building. The tram stops are located about 100 metres north of the entrance building at the underpass to Beresinchen (the Beresinchentunnel). From there, Bahnhofsstraße (station street) runs to the north over former railway-owned land towards the city centre. The former railway buildings were almost completely destroyed in World War II and were replaced by new buildings. Between the bus station and the tram stop is the newly reconstructed "City Residence Hotel Frankfurt Oder". The Kiliansberg settlement on the east side of the station forecourt was built about the same time as the reconstruction of the station between 1922 and 1924 and was also designed by Beringer. It is located on a steep slope above the Oder valley and was built by the Ostmark company with apartments for railway workers as part of the transfer of the Deutsche Reichsbahn divisional administration to Frankfurt. Between the apartments designed by Beringer is a monument made by the sculptor Furstenberg for 1535 railwaymen who died in the First World War. Railway apartments and the monument are on the list of cultural monuments of Brandenburg.

== See also ==
- Rail transport in Germany
- Railway stations in Germany
