= Obersdorf station =

Railway station in Müncheberg, Germany

Obersdorf
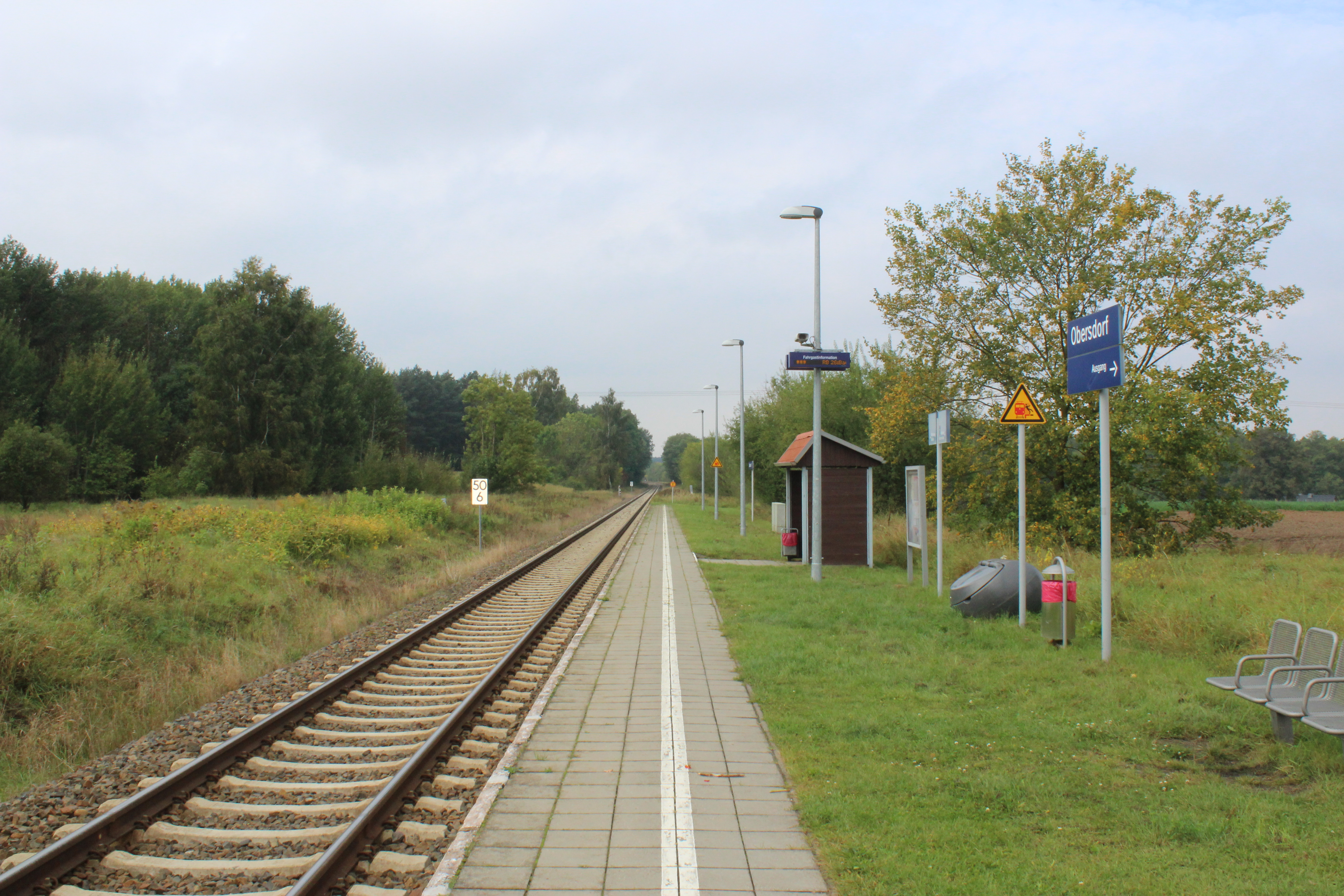
- 2017

General information
- Location: Bahnhofstraße 3; 15374 Müncheberg OT Obersdorf; Brandenburg; Germany
- Coordinates: 52.5369°N 14.1673°E
- Owner: DB Netz
- Operator: DB Station&Service
- Line: Prussian Eastern Railway
- Platforms: 1
- Tracks: 1
- Train operators: Niederbarnimer Eisenbahn

Other information
- Station code: 4690
- DS100 code: BOB
- IBNR: 8012537
- Category: 7
- Fare zone: VBB: 5468
- Website: www.bahnhof.de

Services
Preceding station	Niederbarnimer Eisenbahn	Following station
Müncheberg (Mark) towards Berlin Ostkreuz	RB 26	Trebnitz (Mark) towards Kostrzyn
Location
- Location within Brandenburg

Obersdorf station is a railway station in the municipality of Obersdorf in the Märkisch-Oderland district of Brandenburg, Germany. It is served by the line RB 26.
