= Golzow (Oderbruch) station =

Railway station in Germany

Golzow (Oderbruch)
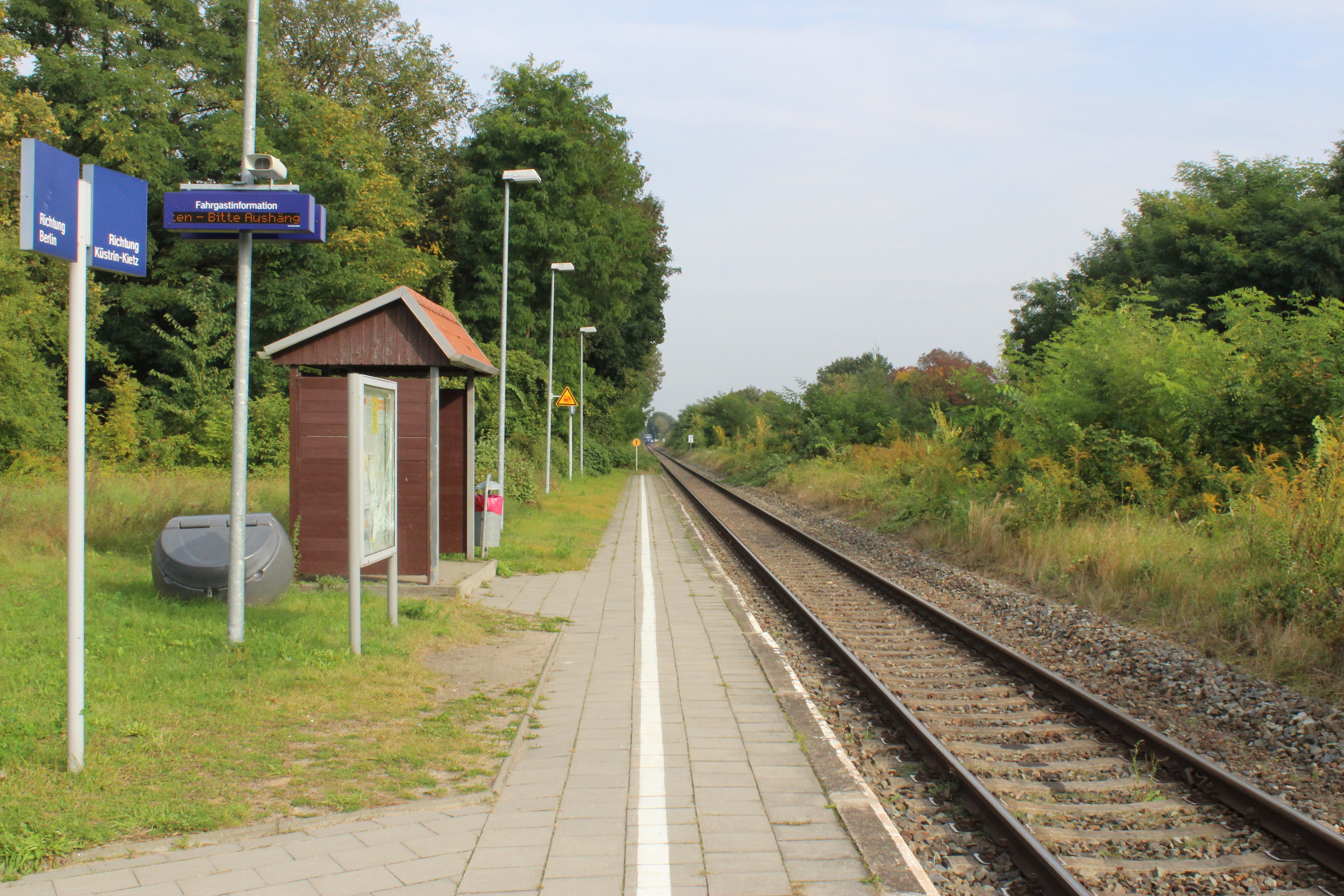
- 2017

General information
- Location: Siedlung; 15328 Golzow; Brandenburg; Germany
- Coordinates: 52.56256°N 14.51233°E
- Owner: DB Netz
- Operator: DB Station&Service
- Lines: Prussian Eastern Railway (KBS 209.26)
- Platforms: 1 side platform
- Tracks: 1
- Train operators: Niederbarnimer Eisenbahn

Other information
- Station code: 2185
- DS100 code: BGZ
- IBNR: 8011672
- Category: 6
- Fare zone: VBB: 5473
- Website: www.bahnhof.de

Services
Preceding station	Niederbarnimer Eisenbahn	Following station
Werbig towards Berlin Ostkreuz	RB 26	Gorgast towards Kostrzyn
Location
- Location within Brandenburg

Golzow (Oderbruch) station is a railway station in the municipality of Golzow (Oderbruch), located in the Märkisch-Oderland district in Brandenburg, Germany.
