= Gorgast station =

Railway station in Germany

Gorgast
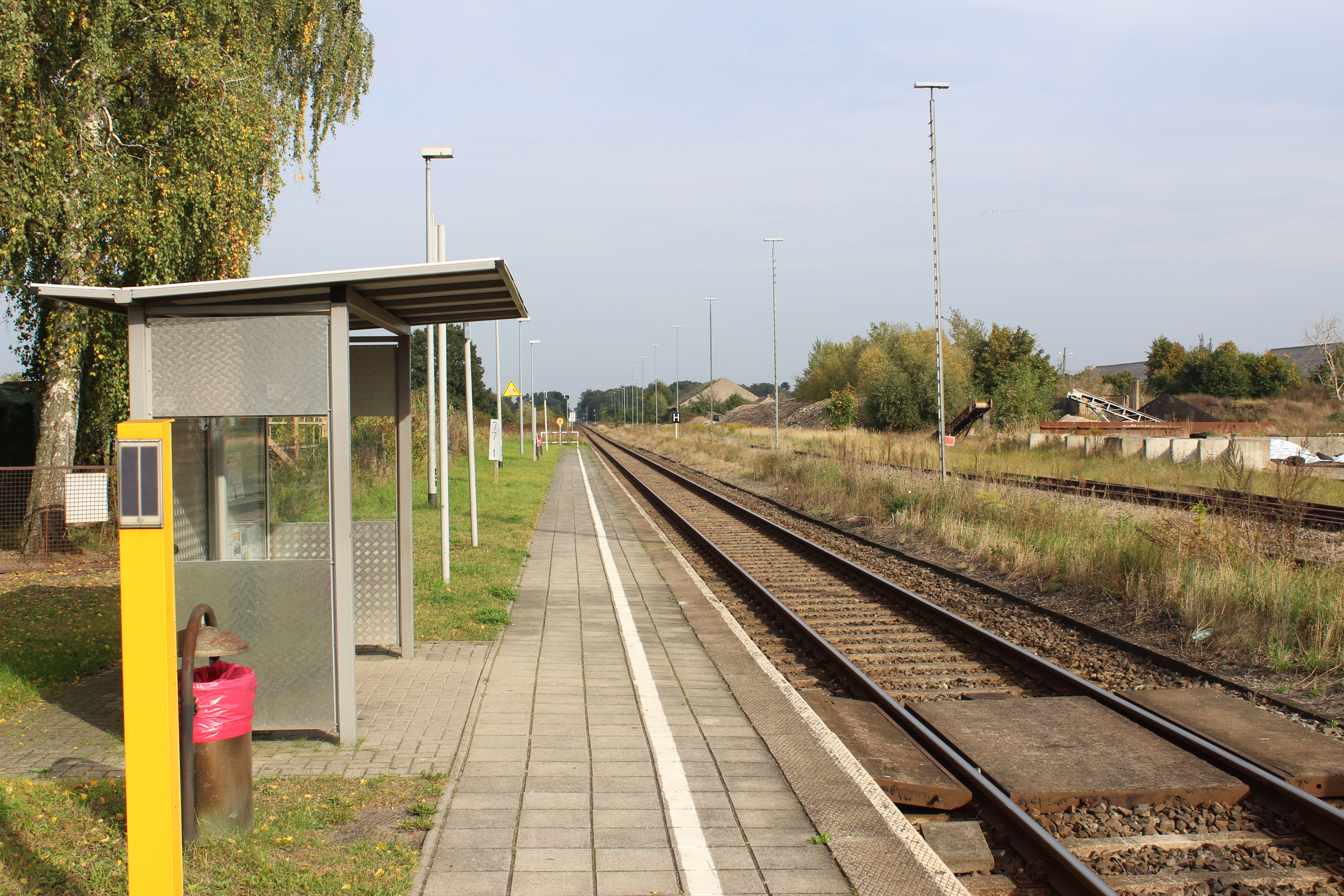
- 2017

General information
- Location: Ernst-Thälmann-Straße 32; 15328 Küstriner Vorland; Brandenburg; Germany
- Coordinates: 52.56319°N 14.55141°E
- Owner: DB Netz
- Operator: DB Station&Service
- Lines: Prussian Eastern Railway (KBS 209.26)
- Platforms: 1 side platform
- Tracks: 1
- Train operators: Niederbarnimer Eisenbahn

Other information
- Station code: 2192
- DS100 code: BGOR
- IBNR: 8011674
- Category: 6
- Fare zone: VBB: 5473
- Website: www.bahnhof.de

Services
Preceding station	Niederbarnimer Eisenbahn	Following station
Golzow (Oderbruch) towards Berlin Ostkreuz	RB 26	Küstrin-Kietz towards Kostrzyn
Location
- Location within Brandenburg

Gorgast station is a railway station in the Gorgast district of the municipality of Küstriner Vorland, located in the Märkisch-Oderland district in Brandenburg, Germany.
