= Trebnitz (Mark) station =

Railway station in Müncheberg, Germany

Trebnitz (Mark)
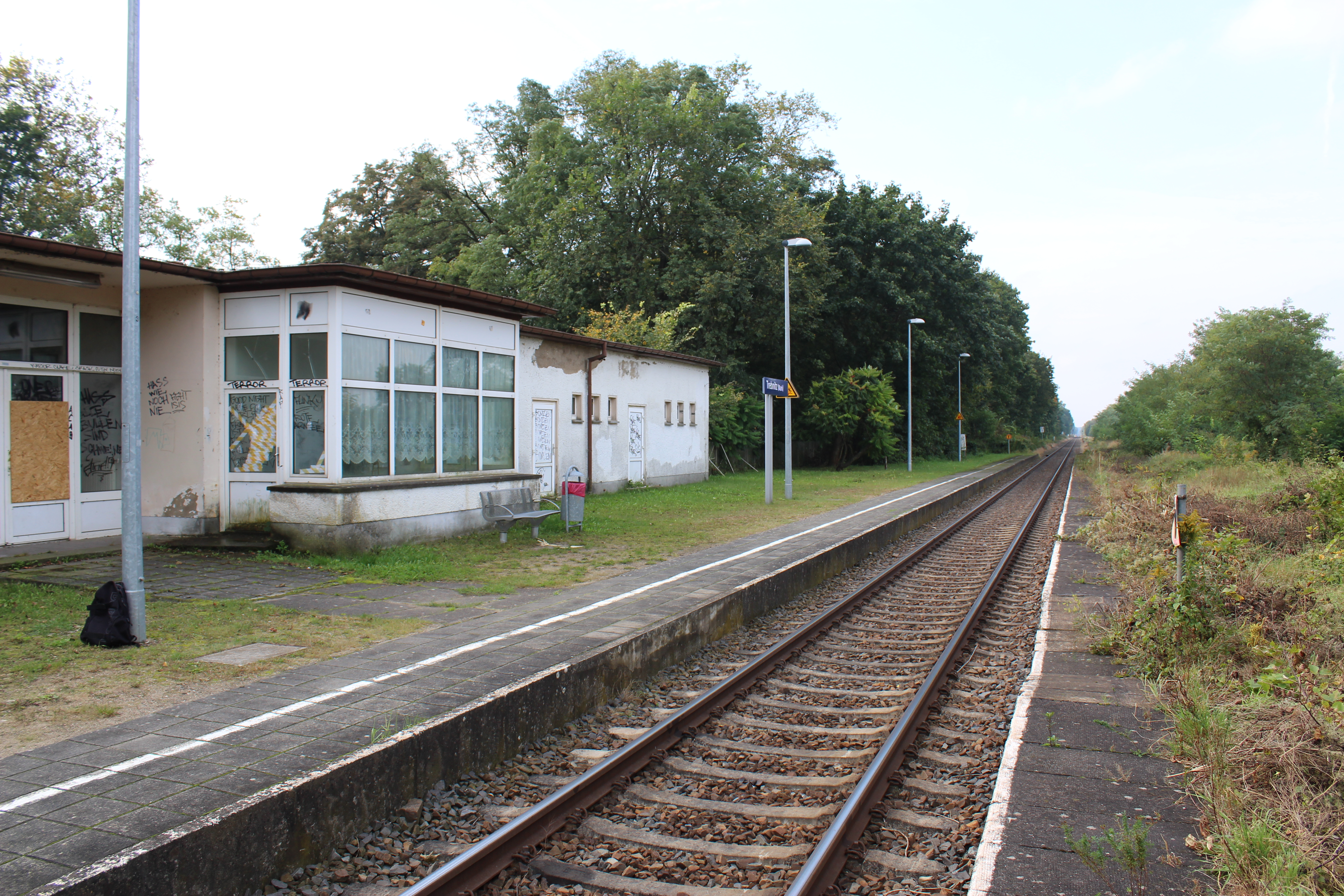
- 2017

General information
- Location: Trebnitzer Bahnhofstraße 6; 15374 Müncheberg OT Trebnitz (Mark); Brandenburg; Germany
- Coordinates: 52.5381°N 14.2166°E
- Owner: DB Netz
- Operator: DB Station&Service
- Line: Prussian Eastern Railway
- Platforms: 1
- Tracks: 1
- Train operators: Niederbarnimer Eisenbahn

Other information
- Station code: 6247
- DS100 code: BTZ
- IBNR: 8013141
- Category: 6
- Fare zone: VBB: 5568
- Website: www.bahnhof.de

History
- Opened: 1 October 1867

Services
Preceding station	Niederbarnimer Eisenbahn	Following station
Obersdorf towards Berlin Ostkreuz	RB 26	Alt Rosenthal towards Kostrzyn
Location
- Location within Brandenburg

Trebnitz (Mark) station is a railway station in the municipality of Trebnitz (Mark) in the Märkisch-Oderland district of Brandenburg, Germany. It is served by the line RB 26.
