= Alt Rosenthal station =

Railway station in Vierlinden, Germany

Alt-Rosenthal
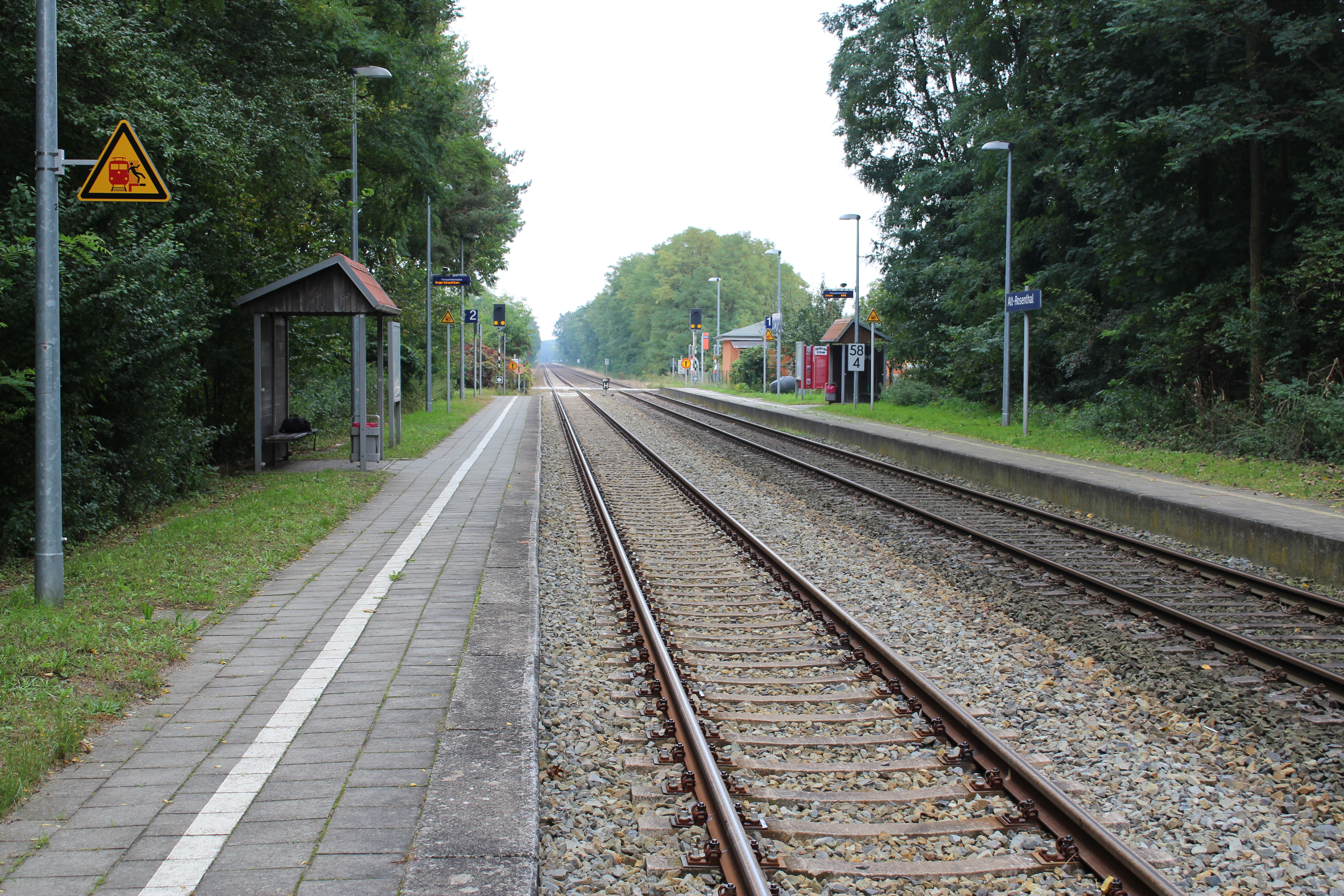
- 2017

General information
- Location: Bahnhofstraße 5; 15306 Vierlinden; Brandenburg; Germany
- Coordinates: 52.5503°N 14.2781°E
- Owner: Deutsche Bahn
- Operator: DB Station&Service
- Line: Prussian Eastern Railway
- Platforms: 2 side platforms
- Tracks: 2
- Train operators: NEB
- Connections: RB 26

Other information
- Station code: 71
- DS100 code: BARO
- IBNR: 8011014
- Category: 6
- Fare zone: : 5470
- Website: www.bahnhof.de

History
- Opened: December 1954

Passengers
- 2012: 20 per day

Services
Preceding station	Niederbarnimer Eisenbahn	Following station
Trebnitz (Mark) towards Berlin Ostkreuz	RB 26	Seelow-Gusow towards Kostrzyn
Location

Alt Rosenthal station is a railway station in the municipality of Vierlinden in the Märkisch-Oderland district of Brandenburg, Germany.
