= Küstrin-Kietz station =

Railway station in Küstriner Vorland, Brandenburg, Germany

Küstrin-Kietz
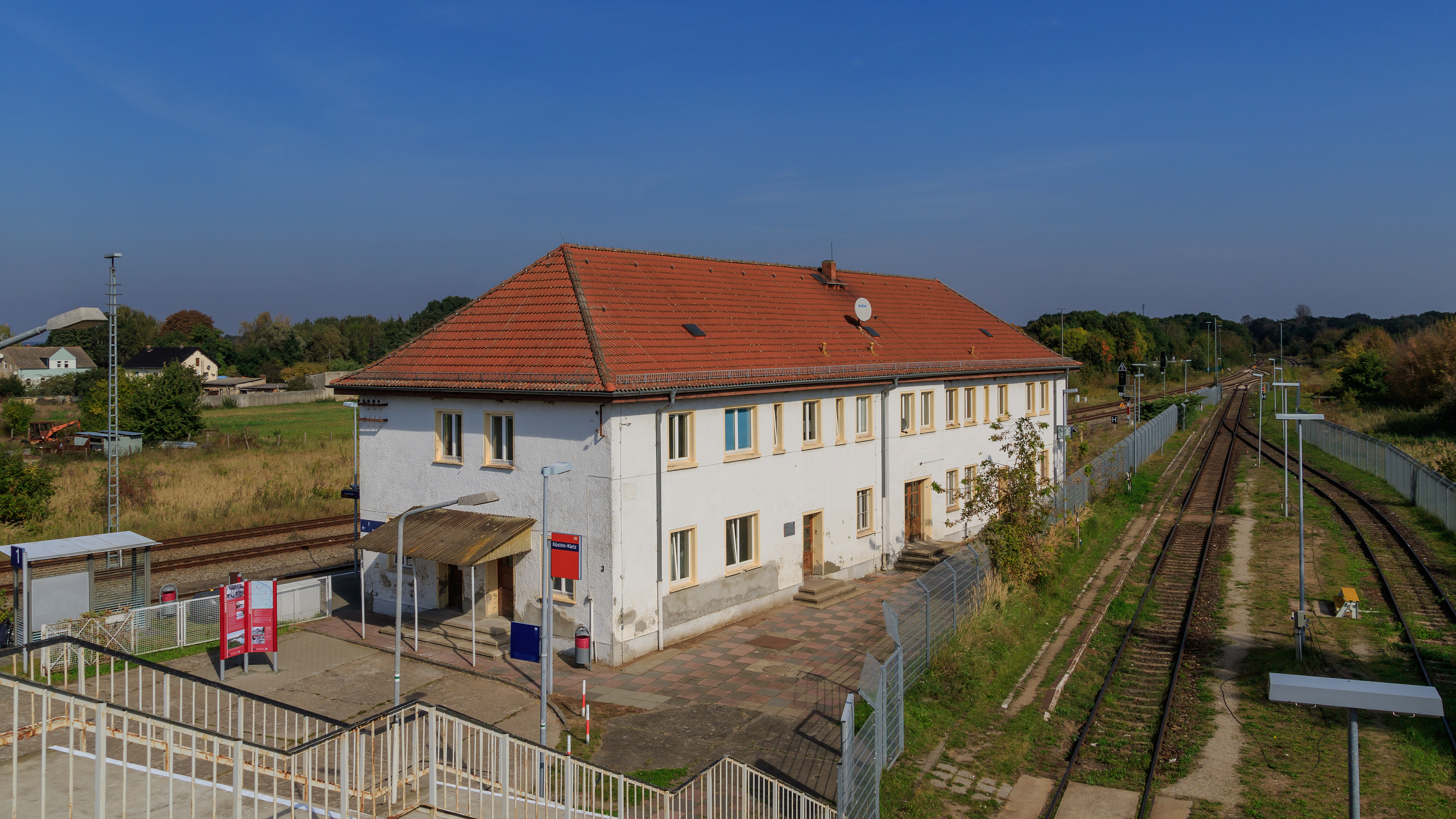
- 2017

General information
- Location: Bahnhofsweg 3; 15328 Küstrin-Kietz; Brandenburg; Germany
- Coordinates: 52.5684°N 14.6079°E
- Owner: DB Netz
- Operator: DB Station&Service
- Lines: Prussian Eastern Railway (KBS 209.26)
- Train operators: Niederbarnimer Eisenbahn

Other information
- Station code: 3478
- DS100 code: BKI
- IBNR: 8010189
- Category: 6
- Fare zone: VBB: 5374
- Website: www.bahnhof.de

History
- Opened: 15 May 1877; 149 years ago

Services
Preceding station	Niederbarnimer Eisenbahn	Following station
Gorgast towards Berlin Ostkreuz	RB 26	Kostrzyn Terminus
Location
- Location within Brandenburg

Küstrin-Kietz station is a railway station in the municipality of Küstrin-Kietz in the Märkisch-Oderland district of Brandenburg, Germany. It is served by trains operated by the privately owned Niederbarnimer Eisenbahn between Berlin-Ostkreuz and Kostrzyn nad Odrą (Poland), via Müncheberg (Mark) and Werbig (line RB 26, the Oderlandbahn).
