= Seelow-Gusow station =

Railway station in Gusow-Platkow, Germany

Seelow-Gusow
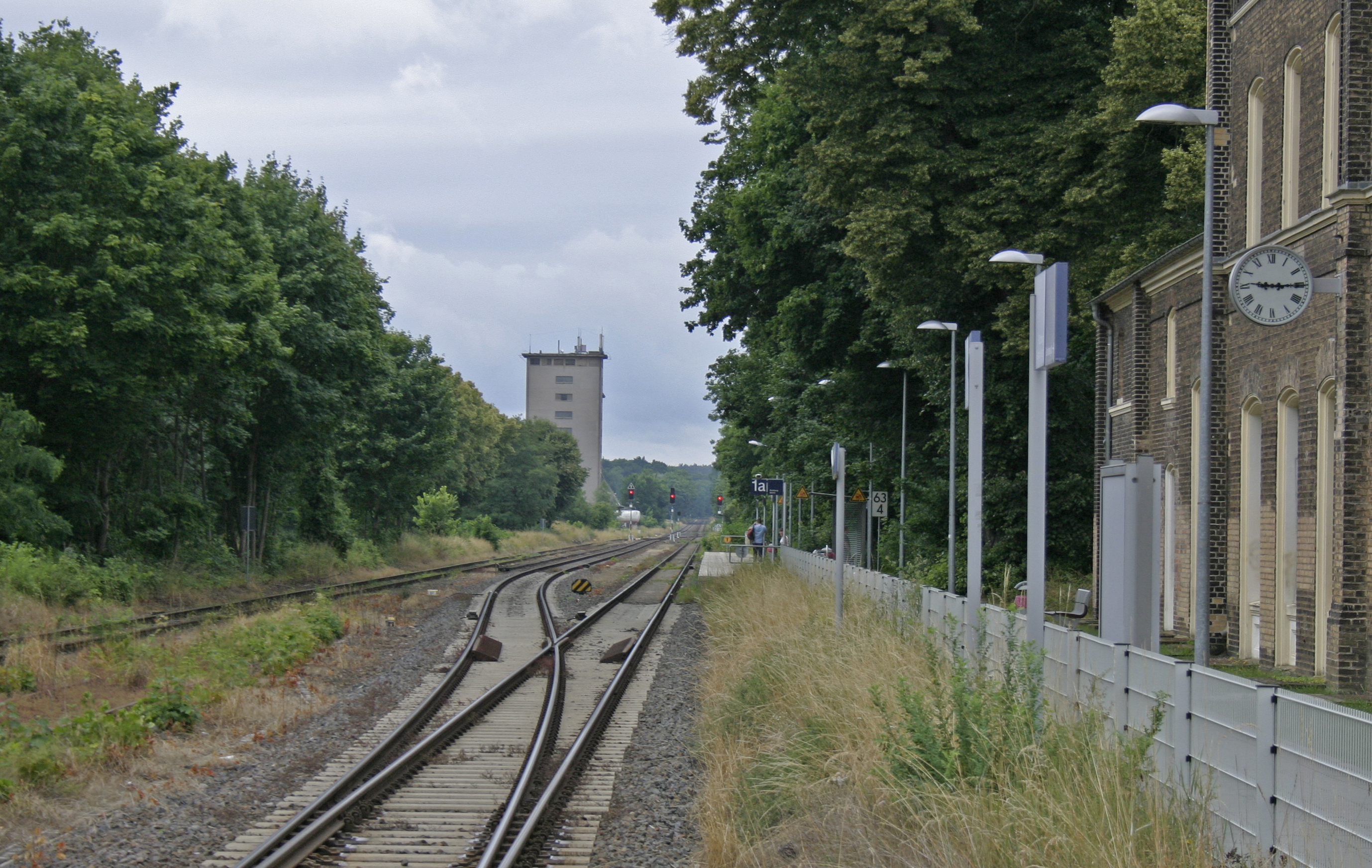
- 2015

General information
- Location: Am Bahnhof 1; 15306 Gusow; Brandenburg; Germany
- Coordinates: 52.5594°N 14.3514°E
- Owner: DB Netz
- Operator: DB Station&Service
- Line: Prussian Eastern Railway
- Platforms: 1
- Tracks: 2
- Train operators: Niederbarnimer Eisenbahn

Other information
- Station code: 2427
- DS100 code: BGSW
- IBNR: 8011788
- Category: 6
- Fare zone: VBB: 5370
- Website: www.bahnhof.de

History
- Opened: 1 October 1866

Services
Preceding station	Niederbarnimer Eisenbahn	Following station
Alt Rosenthal towards Berlin Ostkreuz	RB 26	Werbig towards Kostrzyn
Location
- Location within Brandenburg

Seelow-Gusow station is a railway station in the municipality of Gusow-Platkow in the Märkisch-Oderland district of Brandenburg, Germany. It serves the village of Gusow, as well as the town of Seelow about four kilometers away. It is a stop on the line RB 26.
