= Werbig station =

Railway station in Germany

Werbig
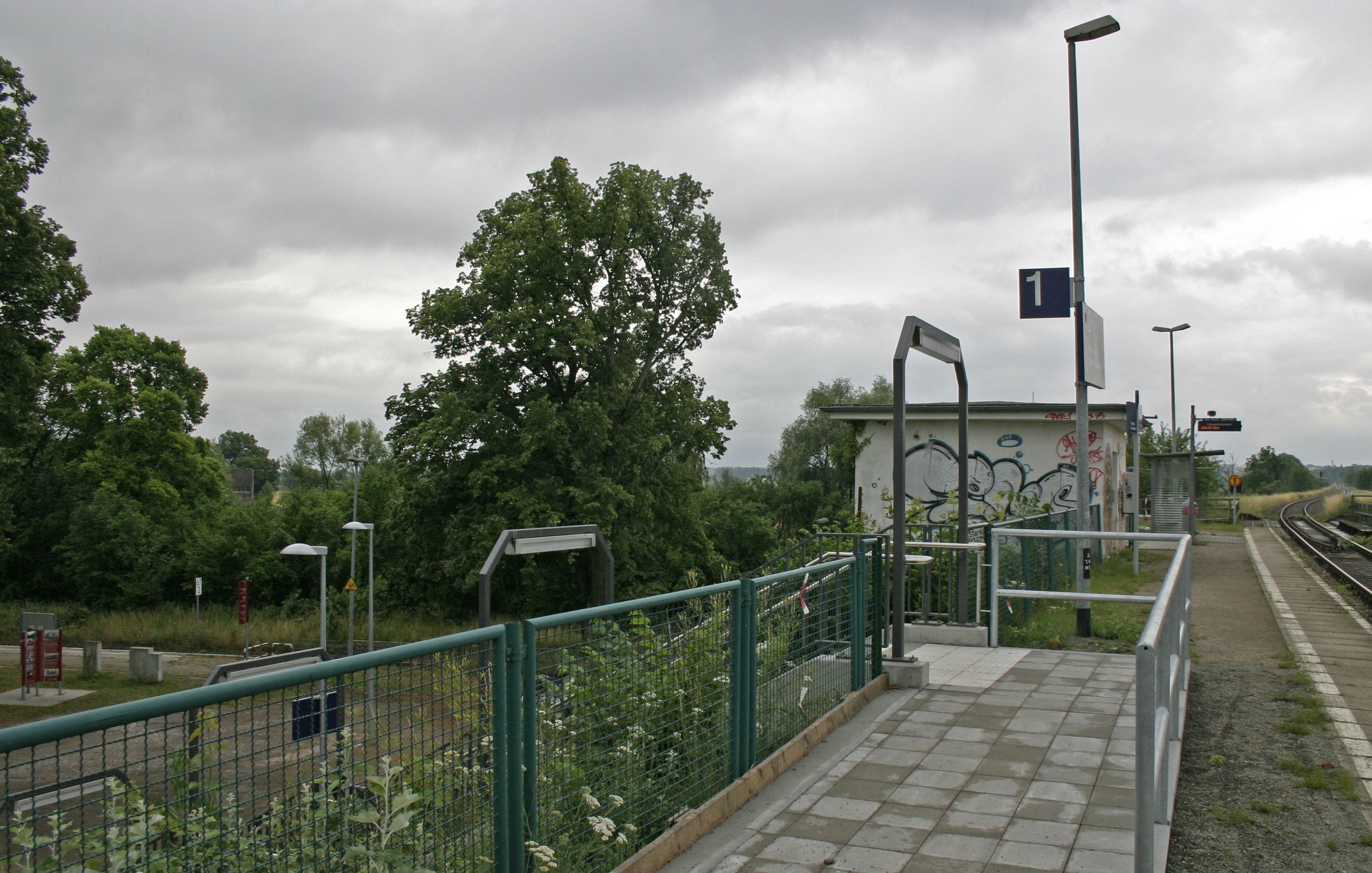
- 2015

General information
- Location: Bahnhofstraße 3; 15306 Seelow; Brandenburg; Germany
- Coordinates: 52°33′53″N 14°24′20″E
- Owner: DB Netz
- Operator: DB Station&Service
- Lines: Prussian Eastern Railway (KBS 209.26); Eberswalde–Frankfurt (Oder) railway (KBS 209.60)
- Platforms: 2
- Tracks: 2
- Train operators: Niederbarnimer Eisenbahn

Other information
- Station code: 6677
- DS100 code: BWR
- IBNR: 8010371
- Category: 6
- Fare zone: VBB: 5471
- Website: www.bahnhof.de

History
- Opened: 15 July 1880

Services
Preceding station	Niederbarnimer Eisenbahn	Following station
Seelow-Gusow towards Berlin Ostkreuz	RB 26	Golzow (Oderbruch) towards Kostrzyn
Letschin towards Eberswalde Hbf	RB 60	Seelow (Mark) towards Frankfurt (Oder)
Location

Werbig station is a railway station in the east of the district Märkisch-Oderland of Brandenburg. In it, the Prussian Eastern Railway (Berlin - Kostrzyn nad Odrą) and the Eberswalde–Frankfurt (Oder) railway intersect. The plant is located in the city's Seelow district of Neulangsow; the eponymous district Werbig is located southwest of it. It is served by the lines RB 26 and RB 60.
