= Müncheberg (Mark) station =

Railway station in Müncheberg, Germany

Müncheberg (Mark)
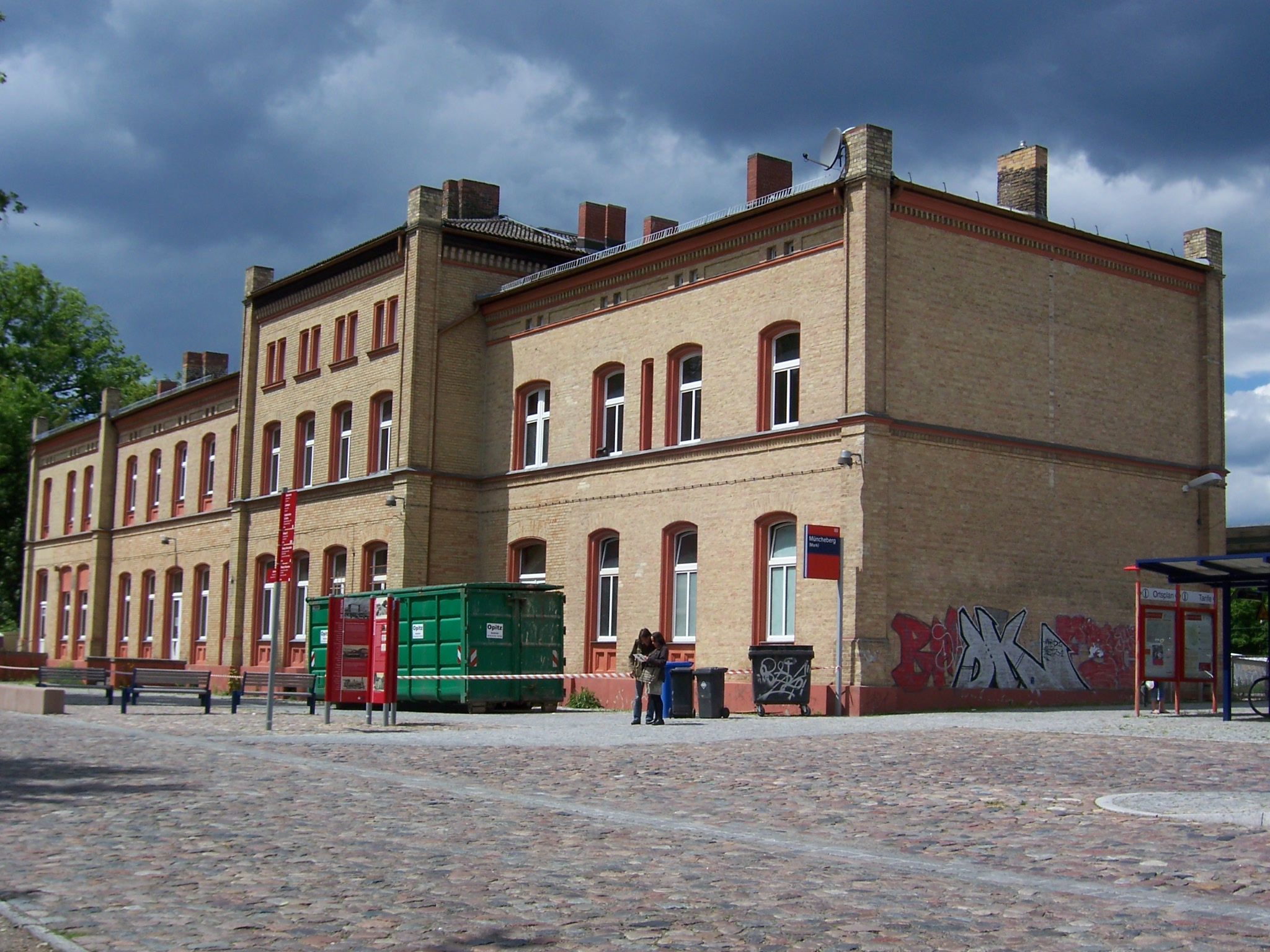
- 2012

General information
- Location: Am Bahnhof 1; 15374 Müncheberg; Brandenburg; Germany
- Coordinates: 52.5245°N 14.1004°E
- Owner: DB Netz
- Operator: DB Station&Service
- Lines: Prussian Eastern Railway; Buckower Kleinbahn; Müncheberger Kleinbahn
- Platforms: 2
- Tracks: 2
- Train operators: Niederbarnimer Eisenbahn

Other information
- Station code: 4228
- DS100 code: BMB
- IBNR: 8010236
- Category: 6
- Fare zone: VBB: 5567
- Website: www.bahnhof.de

History
- Opened: 1 October 1867

Services
Preceding station	Niederbarnimer Eisenbahn	Following station
Rehfelde towards Berlin Ostkreuz	RB 26	Obersdorf towards Kostrzyn
Location
- Location within Brandenburg

Müncheberg (Mark) station is a railway station in the municipality of Müncheberg in the Märkisch-Oderland district of Brandenburg, Germany. It is served by the line RB 26.
