= Seelow (Mark) station =

Railway station in Germany

Seelow (Mark)
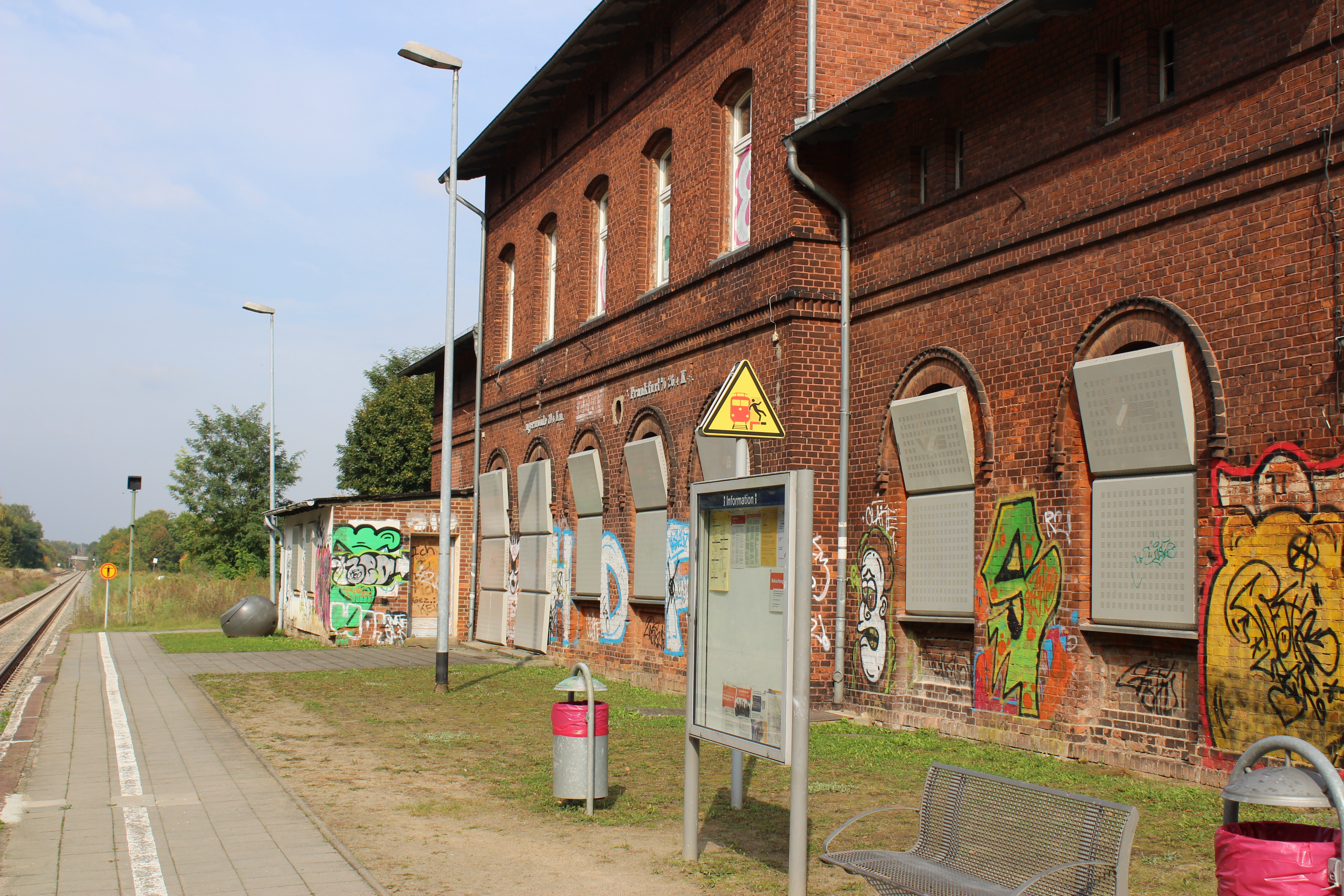
- 2017

General information
- Location: Am Bahnhof 3; 15306 Seelow (Mark); Brandenburg; Germany
- Coordinates: 52°32′18″N 14°23′40″E
- Owner: DB Netz
- Operator: DB Station&Service
- Line: Eberswalde–Frankfurt (Oder) railway
- Platforms: 1 side platform
- Tracks: 2
- Train operators: Niederbarnimer Eisenbahn

Other information
- Station code: 5793
- DS100 code: BSLO
- IBNR: 8012973
- Category: 6
- Fare zone: VBB: 5571
- Website: www.bahnhof.de

Services
Preceding station	Niederbarnimer Eisenbahn	Following station
Werbig towards Eberswalde Hbf	RB 60	Frankfurt (Oder) Terminus
Location
- Location within Brandenburg

Seelow (Mark) station is a railway station in the municipality of Seelow (Mark), located in the Märkisch-Oderland district in Brandenburg, Germany.
