= Berlin Ostkreuz station =

Train station in Berlin

Berlin Ostkreuz
- Berlin Ostkreuz in March 2024

General information
- Location: Sonntagstr. 37, Friedrichshain, Rummelsburg, Berlin; Germany
- Coordinates: 52°30′11″N 13°28′8″E
- Owner: Deutsche Bahn
- Operator: DB Netz; DB Station&Service
- Lines: Stadtbahn (KBS 200.5, 200.7, 200.75, 200.9); Ringbahn (KBS 200.41, 200.42, 200.8, 200.85, 200.9); Lower Silesian-March Railway (KBS 200.3); Eastern Railway (KBS 200.5, 200.7, 200.75)
- Platforms: 6 S-Bahn; 6 Regionalbahn
- Connections: 194 347 N94

Construction
- Accessible: Yes

Other information
- Station code: 4809
- DS100 code: BOK
- IBNR: 8089028
- Category: 3
- Fare zone: : Berlin A/5555
- Website: www.bahnhof.de

History
- Opened: 7 February 1882; 144 years ago
- Former names: Stralau-Rummelsburg (1882–1933)

Key dates
- 2006–2018: Reconstruction

Passengers
- 2018: 235,000
Services
Preceding station	DB Fernverkehr	Following station
Eberswalde Hbf towards Rostock Hbf	IC 17	Elsterwerda towards Dresden Hbf or Chemnitz Hbf
Berlin Ostbahnhof towards Norddeich Mole	IC 56 IC 2432 only	Königs Wusterhausen towards Cottbus Hbf
Berlin Hbf Terminus	EC 95	Frankfurt (Oder) towards Warszawa Wschodnia or Gdynia Główna
Preceding station	DB Regio Nordost	Following station
Berlin Gesundbrunnen towards Berlin Hbf	Flughafen-Express	BER Airport Terminus
Berlin Ostbahnhof towards Dessau Hbf	RE 7	Königs Wusterhausen towards Senftenberg
Berlin Ostbahnhof towards Nauen	RB 14	Terminus
Berlin-Lichtenberg towards Eberswalde Hbf	RB 24	Berlin-Schöneweide towards Wünsdorf-Waldstadt
Berlin-Lichtenberg towards Oranienburg	RB 32	Berlin-Schöneweide towards Ludwigsfelde
Preceding station	Niederbarnimer Eisenbahn	Following station
Terminus	RB 12	Berlin-Lichtenberg towards Templin Stadt
Terminus	RB 25	Berlin-Lichtenberg towards Werneuchen
Terminus	RB 26	Berlin-Lichtenberg towards Kostrzyn
Preceding station	Ostdeutsche Eisenbahn	Following station
Berlin Ostbahnhof towards Brandenburg Hbf or Magdeburg Hbf	RE 1	Erkner towards Cottbus Hbf or Frankfurt (Oder)
Berlin Alexanderplatz towards Nauen	RE 2	Königs Wusterhausen towards Cottbus Hbf
Preceding station	Berlin S-Bahn	Following station
Warschauer Straße towards Spandau	S3	Rummelsburg towards Erkner
Frankfurter Allee One-way operation	S41	Treptower Park Ringbahn (clockwise)
Frankfurter Allee Ringbahn (counter-clockwise)	S42	Treptower Park One-way operation
Warschauer Straße towards Westkreuz	S5	Nöldnerplatz towards Strausberg Nord
Warschauer Straße towards Potsdam Hbf	S7	Nöldnerplatz towards Ahrensfelde
Warschauer Straße Terminus	S75	Nöldnerplatz towards Wartenberg
Frankfurter Allee towards Birkenwerder	S8	Treptower Park towards Wildau
Frankfurter Allee towards Waidmannslust	S85	Treptower Park towards Grünau
Location

Berlin Ostkreuz station (German: Bahnhof Berlin Ostkreuz) (literally "Berlin East Cross") is a station on the Berlin S-Bahn suburban railway and the busiest interchange station in Berlin. It is in the former East Berlin district of Friedrichshain, now part of the borough of Friedrichshain-Kreuzberg. A smaller part of the station is in Rummelsburg, part of the borough of Lichtenberg. The station is a Turmbahnhof ("tower station", i.e., a two-level interchange) with the Berlin–Frankfurt (Oder) railway ("Lower Silesian–March Railway") and the Prussian Eastern Railway on the lower level and the Berlin Ringbahn on the upper level. It is used by a total of around 235,000 passengers every day on eight lines, entering or leaving.

The station was completely reconstructed from 2006 to December 2018 while operations continued. In the past it was exclusively used as a Berlin S-Bahn station, but it is now also a stopping point for regional services. This station is open 24/7.

== History ==
A railway crossing point in the area later called Ostkreuz was created in 1871 with the commissioning of the Ringbahn, which there crossed the tracks of the Lower Silesian–March Railway (Niederschlesisch-Märkische Bahn, also called the Silesian Railway), which was opened in 1842, and the Eastern Railway, which was extended to Berlin in 1867. This crossing was supplemented by two connecting curves from the Ringbahn to the tracks towards the city in 1872. Initially, they only served freight traffic, but on 1 January 1872 passenger traffic ran from the newly built Stralau station on the south curve to the Niederschlesisch-Märkisches station (later called just the Schlesischer—"Silesian"—station, now the Ostbahnhof).

There was no station at the intersection of the lines at that time. A transfer station was instead built to the south at the junction with the connecting curve. It was initially called Niederschlesisch-Märkischer Anschluß ("Lower Silesian–March connection") and was renamed Stralau in April 1872. This provided connections between passenger trains on the connecting curve and commuter trains to and from the Silesian station.

Around 1880, the railway facilities in the area were completely rebuilt. While the Eastern Railway and the Silesian Railway formerly ran in parallel and ended at different stations, they were combined with the reconstruction of both lines east of the connecting curves to the Ringbahn. Passenger traffic of both lines ran to the Silesian station and subsequently the old terminus of the Eastern Railway, Old Ostbahnhof, served only goods traffic. Two lines connected the newly built shunting yards in Lichtenberg-Friedrichsfelde and Rummelsburg to the Ringbahn. Previously, freight trains from the lines from the east to the Ringbahn had to make an awkward reversal in the Silesian station.

During the construction of the tracks at the Silesian station, the passenger tracks running from there to the east were also rebuilt. The southern pair of tracks served traffic to the Eastern Railway and the Silesian Railway, which branched in the area where the Ringbahn crosses. The northern track pair was built in a slightly different position than the earlier connecting curves. It served only the suburban traffic and connected to the Ringbahn to the north and south. The construction of new connecting ramps in the area of the later Ostkreuz station, in a different location than the old ones, began on 1 September 1879 together with the reconstruction of the tracks in the Silesian station. During this work, passenger traffic was temporarily relocated to the old Ostbahnhof station. In July 1880, the Silesian station went back into service for passenger traffic, followed by further construction work to connect it with the new Berlin Stadtbahn. Stralau-Rummelsburg station was opened with the commissioning of this work on 7 February 1882.

=== Stralau-Rummelsburg station ===
The station was named after the nearby villages of Stralau and Rummelsburg, and replaced halts on the Ringbahn at Stralau on the Ringbahn and Rummelsburg on the Silesian Railway. The station was owned jointly by the Eastern Railway, the Silesian Railway and the Ringbahn. It had a platform (later platform A) between the two connecting curves, an "intermediate" platform (in Germany, a low island platform with one platform edge and sometimes accessed by passengers across a rail track) on each of the curves connecting in opposite directions and a side and intermediate platform on the tracks of the Silesian Railway. There was no platform on the tracks of the Eastern Railway, so its trains stopped at the platforms of the Silesian Railway if necessary. There was a crossover east of the station and another crossover at the present Modersohn bridge to the west of the station. As there was no platform on the through Ringbahn tracks, no passenger trains stopped on it. The suburban trains of the Ringbahn coming from both the north and south ran via the connecting curves to Stralau-Rummelsburg station on the Stadtbahn and vice versa in the opposite direction. Stralau-Rummelsburg was also the end or starting point for some trains running on the Stadtbahn.

The later platforms B and C were opened in 1896 on the outsides of the two connecting curves and replaced the existing intermediate platforms. They were built to serve increased traffic as a result of the Great Industrial Exposition of Berlin held in Treptow in 1896.

=== First major reconstruction ===
At the beginning of the 20th century, the station and the railway facilities adjoining to the east were rebuilt because the at-grade junctions of the Eastern Railway and the Silesian Railway at the station had become an obstacle to the growing traffic. East of the station, the tracks for the long-distance lines were separated from the suburban lines and elevated on both lines. The Eastern Railway received two suburban tracks and a goods track to their north, while the long-distance traffic of the Eastern Railway ran over the VnK line to join the Silesian Railway further east. On the Silesian Railway the suburban tracks were separated from the long-distance tracks. The suburban tracks of the Stadtbahn were connected with those of Eastern Railway and the Silesian Railway in Stralau-Rummelsburg station. The associated platforms were put in operation on 1 October 1903 (Eastern Railway, platform D) and 18 April 1903 (Silesian Railway, platform E). The new platform F on the Ringbahn on the upper level of the station went into operation on 1 May 1903. At the same time, platform D also received a new entrance building on the west side of the platform giving access to the upper-level platforms A, B and C. Since the reconstruction, suburban trains have run directly from the Eastern Railway and the Silesian Railway to the suburban tracks of the Stadtbahn and the suburban tracks of the Ringbahn have run through the upper platform of the station.

The design of the core of the station remained essentially unchanged for more than a century. Some alterations took place from 1923 to designs by Richard Brademann. A pedestrian bridge was built over platforms D and E with exits to Hauptstraße and Sonntagstraße and ticket offices at each end.

Electrical operations gradually commenced on all suburban lines in 1928 and 1929, and they were rebranded as the Berlin S-Bahn in 1930. A rectification plant was built on the Markgrafendamm south of the station. The platforms were raised to a height of 96 centimetres.

=== Ostkreuz station after 1933 ===
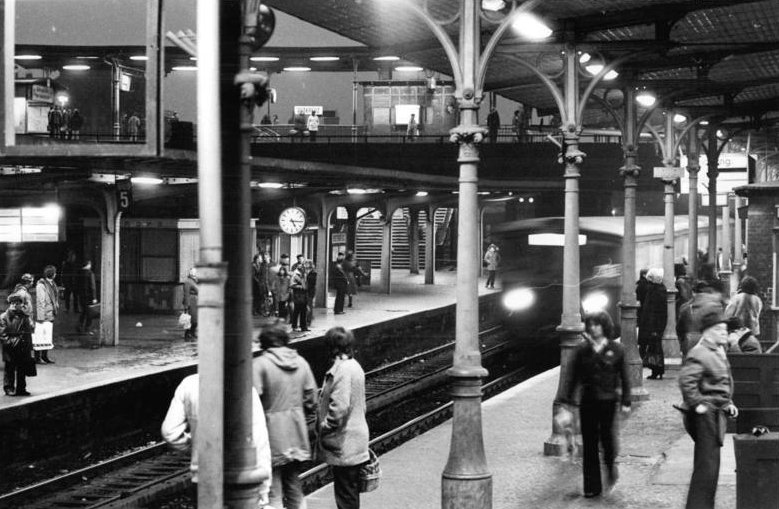
Platform E (Erkner line) with departing train, platform D on the left, platform F above, 1981

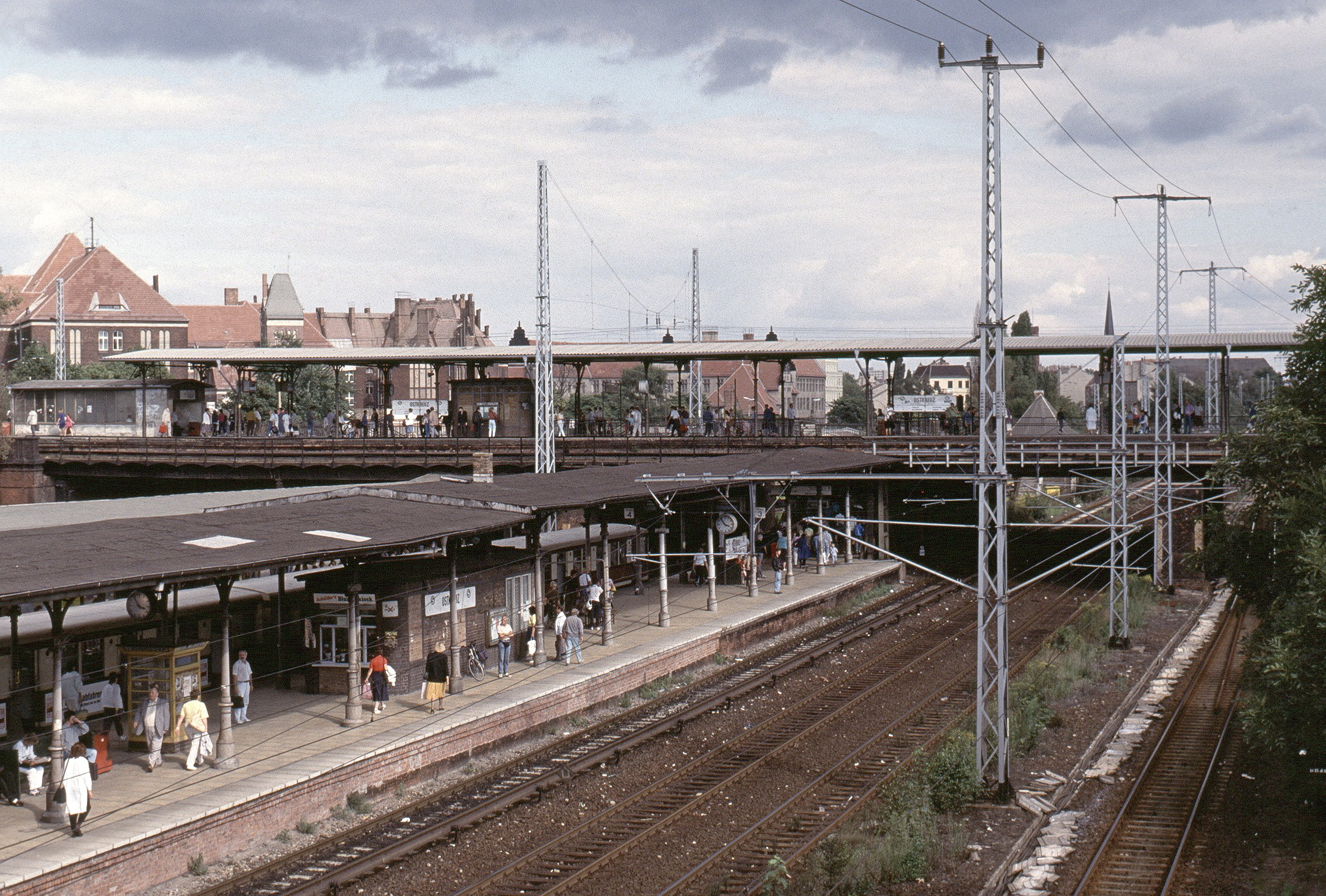
Platform F (above) and platform E, 1991

On 15 March 1933, the station was renamed Ostkreuz, following the renaming of Westkreuz a few years earlier. According to the Germania plan of the Nazis for the reconstruction of Berlin as capital of the Third Reich, a major station would have been built at Ostkreuz as the Ostbahnhof (east station). The planned nine mainline platforms would have been east of the Ringbahn. The S-Bahn services would have used three low-level platforms instead of two platforms and another new platform was intended as a replacement for platform A on the connecting curve from the city to the southern Ringbahn.

In the Second World War, the station area was severely damaged by bombing. Nevertheless, from June 1945, operation gradually resumed. The southern Ringbahn curve was out of service from February/March 1945 and was only usable again from August 1946. The two S-Bahn tracks of the Silesian Railway were dismantled for war reparations, so with the reconstruction of the S-Bahn line (initially as a single track) in January 1948, trains stopped at a temporary platform on the mainline tracks.

With the division of Berlin, the traffic importance of the station grew because a number of through connections had become unavailable since, at the latest, the construction of the Berlin Wall. In addition, new large residential areas were developed in the east of the city, especially in the 1970s and 1980s, which were accessible by the S-Bahn.

The outer platforms on the northern and southern connecting curve to the Ringbahn were closed in 1966 due to structural defects and were later demolished. Scheduled passenger services on the northern Ringbahn curve ended in 1994. The northern curve was occasionally used for stock transfers and excursions until May 2006. The tracks were then removed gradually during the reconstruction of the station.

=== Rebuilding the station ===
==== East German plans ====
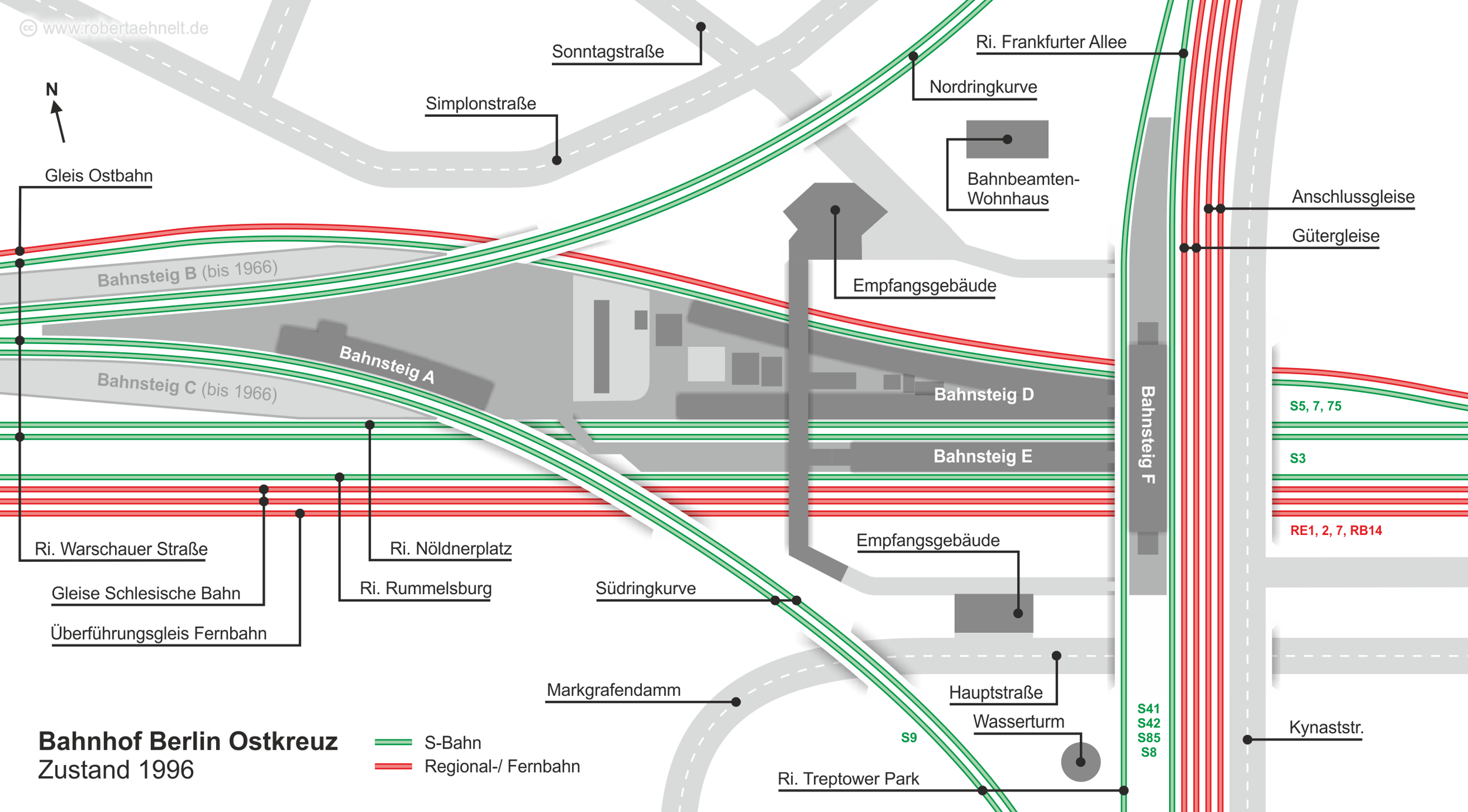
Layout before the reconstruction

The station was greatly in need of renovation for decades and was not capable of handling peak hour traffic, partly due to its narrow stairs. For a long time there were proposals to restructure it in order to make the stairs and passages more usable. In the mid-1950s, the Berliner Zeitung surveyed its readers for ideas to improve the situation. As a result, Deutsche Reichsbahn announced in early 1956 that the stairs from the Ringbahn platform to the low-level platform D would be widened by 1 metre (3 ft 3 in). However, a complete renovation of the station would be necessary after this "small solution" was carried out. Planning for more extensive remodelling continued. In 1957, the construction of a second Ringbahn platform west of the existing platform to relieve congestion was considered. In 1959, it was announced that the reconstruction of the station would begin in 1962 or 1963. This would involve the construction of a 6-metre (19 ft 8 in)-wide tunnel below the lower platforms to connect with both the station's entrance hall and the broad steps down from the lower platforms. Provision was made for the construction of escalators. The work was expected to cost 7.5 million marks. In 1986, Erich Honecker announced the beginning of the "complex reconstruction" of the Ostkreuz S-Bahn junction for the period up to 1990.

The Reichsbahn ultimately failed to implement this scheme because of its complexity and high cost. No major changes occurred at the station for decades and it was referred to ironically as Rostkreuz ("rust cross"). It is now partially protected as a monument, so that the redevelopment of the station complex in the 21st century required compromises to preserve the historic buildings.

==== Planning 2008–18 ====
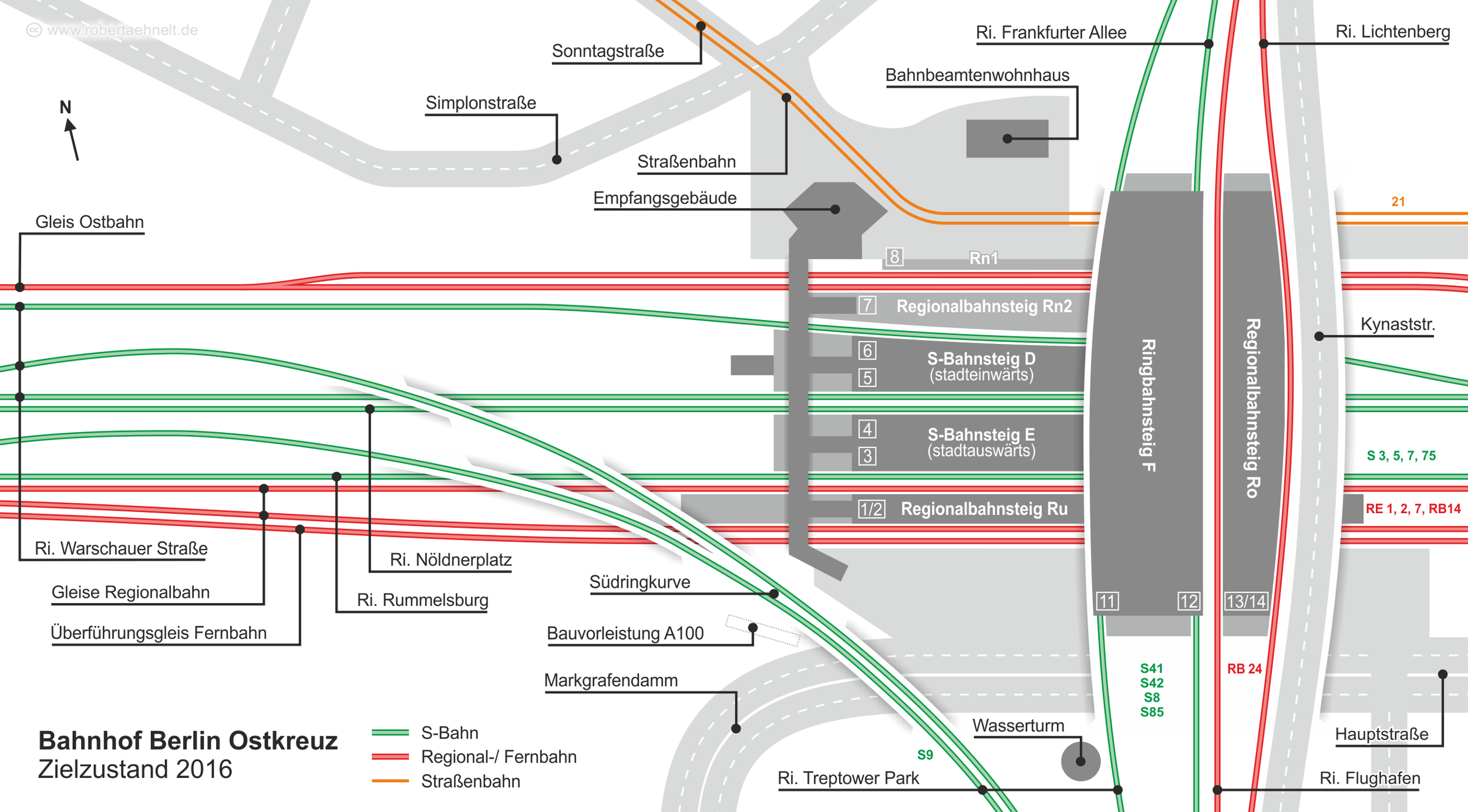
Layout after completion of the reconstruction in 2018

Concrete plans for rebuilding Ostkreuz station were included in a project for "improving the Berlin railway node" after German reunification. Thus project, which aimed to improve the performance of the networks of the long-distance, regional and S-Bahn railways in Berlin and to improve urban transport significantly, was classified in the federal railway development act (Bundesschienenwegeausbaugesetz) as an "absolute priority". On 30 October 2006, the Federal Railway Authority gave planning approval for the first stage of the project. On 19 September 2012, planning approval was issued for the second stage, which mainly comprised improvements to the railway infrastructure along Hauptstraße to Schlichtallee including the southern overpass over Karlshorster Straße.

The reconstruction of the railway facilities at Ostkreuz went into full operation in December 2018, at which time transport planners expected the station to be used by over 123,000 passengers a day as a result of the reconstruction.

The Berliner Verkehrsbetriebe has also considered extending U-Bahn line U1 to Ostkreuz station. The U1 would thus connect large parts of Kreuzberg to the eastern Ringbahn. This project would be realised after 2020.

==== Construction project ====
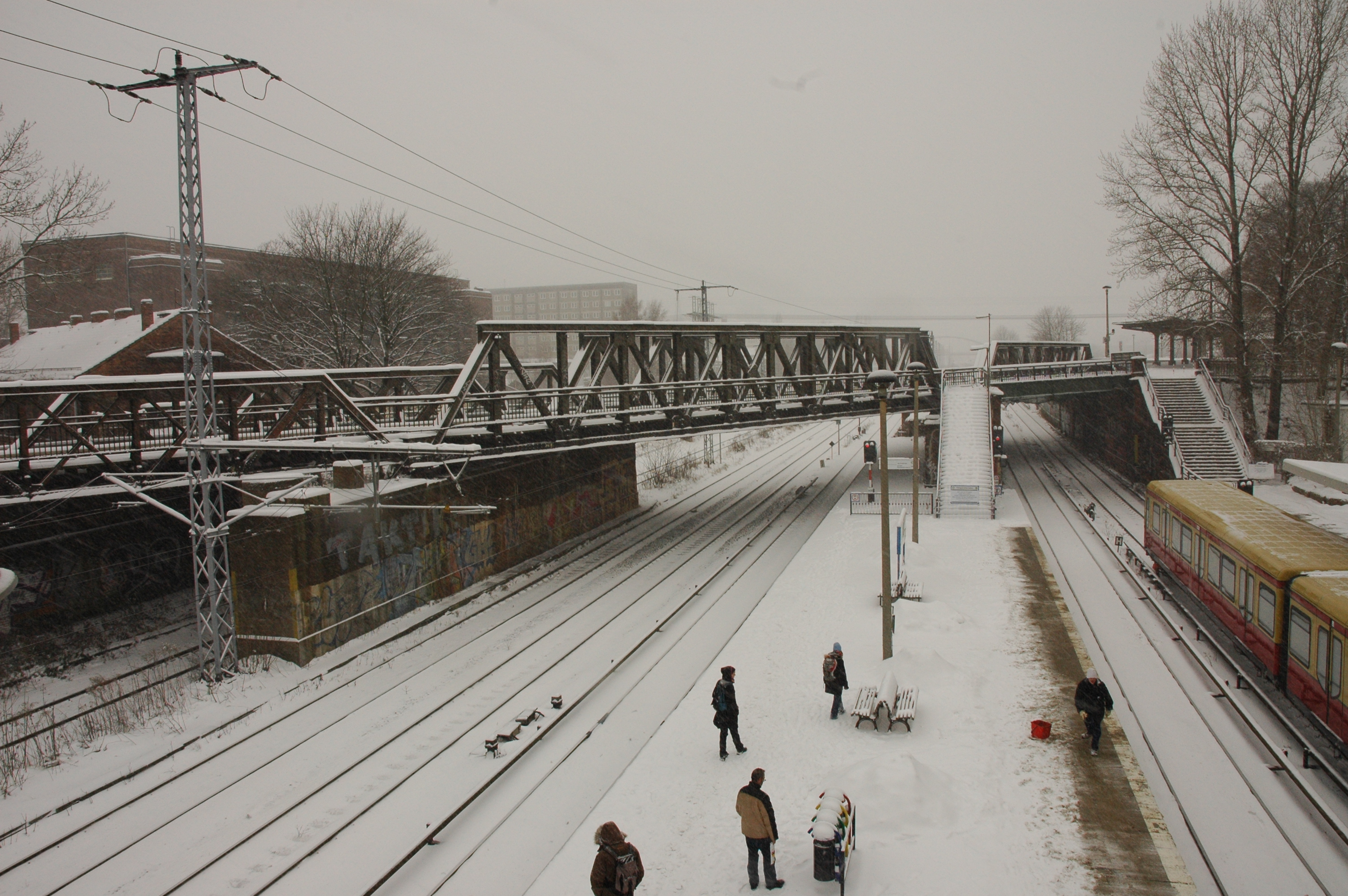
Bridges of the old south Ringbahn curve before demolition, 2005

The project included, in addition to Ostkreuz station, the tracks between Ostbahnhof in the west and Nöldnerplatz and Rummelsburg in the east, including the reconstruction of Warschauer Straße station and the tracks to the Treptower Park station to the south.

The reconstruction amounted to new construction, which was carried out while trains continued running and therefore took over ten years to complete. All essential facilities of the station, such as platforms, stairs, bridges and track systems were remodeled or rebuilt. Among other things, 12 lifts and 17 escalator were installed and new entrances from all four surrounding districts were built.

The facilities of the new station differ in many ways from those of the old. Prior to the rebuilding, S-Bahn trains on the line to Erkner stopped at one platform and the trains on the lines to Strausberg, Ahrensfelde and Wartenberg via Lichtenberg stopped at another. Since the reconstruction, the two lower platforms have been served by train running in the same direction to allow easy interchange (known as Richtungsbetrieb—directional operation). The northern platform is served by all trains running towards the city centre, while the southern platform is used by trains running in the opposite direction. The track from Erkner crosses the track to Lichtenberg on a bridge to the east of the platforms. The Ringbahn S-Bahn platform was rebuilt at the old location, but it is now much wider and has been given a train shed. There is now no platform at the connecting curve from the southern Ringbahn to Stadtbahn, which is used by line S9 from Berlin Brandenburg Airport.

Regional platforms were built on the low-level part of the station on both the Silesian Railway (south of the S-Bahn) for trains running east–west and the Eastern Railway (north of the S-Bahn). In addition, a regional platform was built on the Ringbahn in the high-level part of the station.

Provision has been made for a tunnel section under the tracks of the Stadtbahn for the planned extension of autobahn 100 (Berlin city ring, 17th construction phase). It is 130 metres (426 ft 6 in) long and consists of a 3,000 m^{2} (32,000 sq ft) reinforced concrete slab resting on 20 to 30 metres (65 ft 7 in to 98 ft 5 in) deep diaphragm walls. This allows an actual motorway tunnel to be built in the future without further interference with rail traffic.

The tramway that now runs through Boxhagener Straße will in future run directly to Ostkreuz and stop in the northern area under the platform of the Ringbahn. The aim is to shorten transfer times and to provide direct access for feeder traffic from the surrounding residential areas.

==== Construction process ====
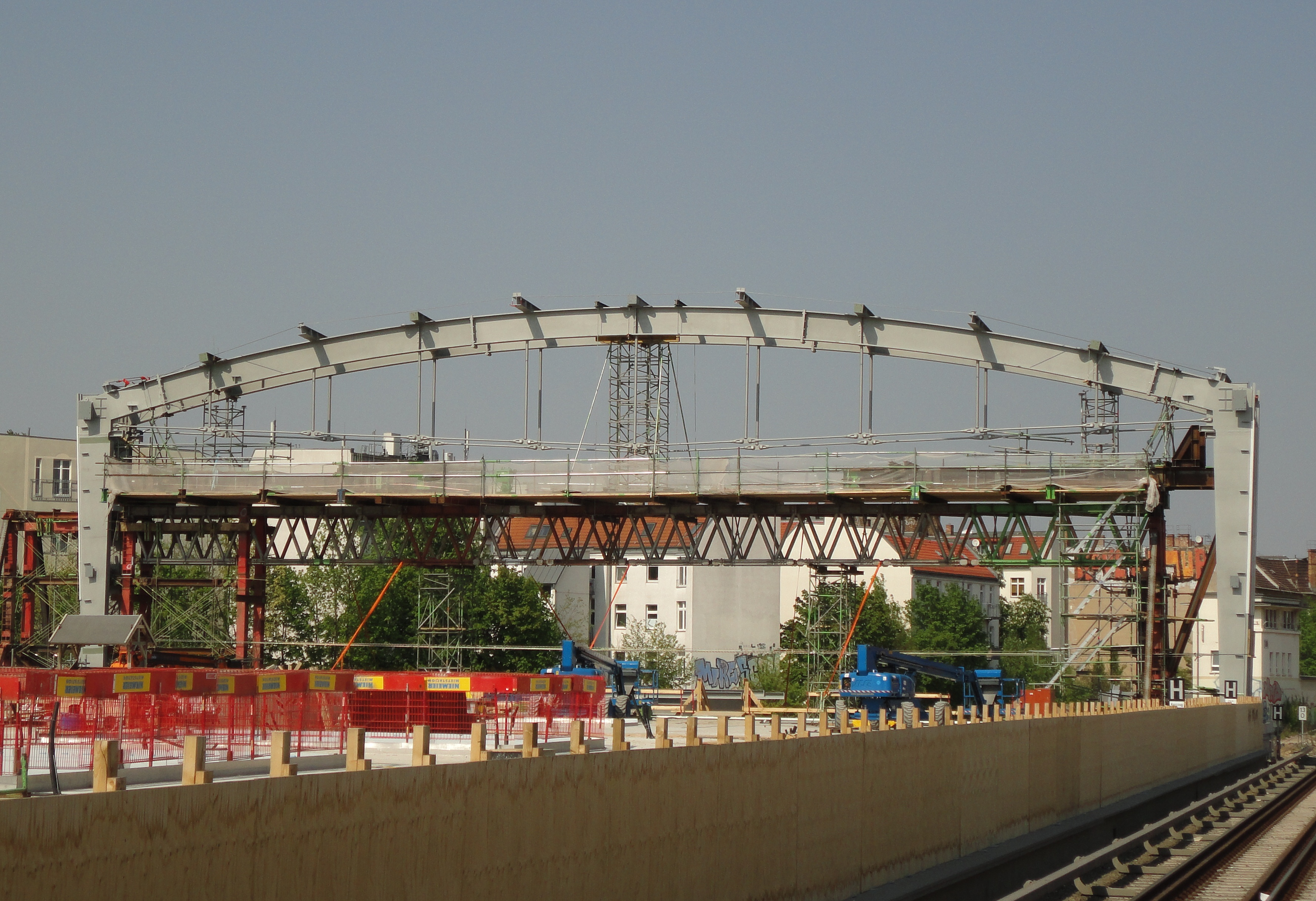
Reconstruction of the Ringbahn train shed, April 2011

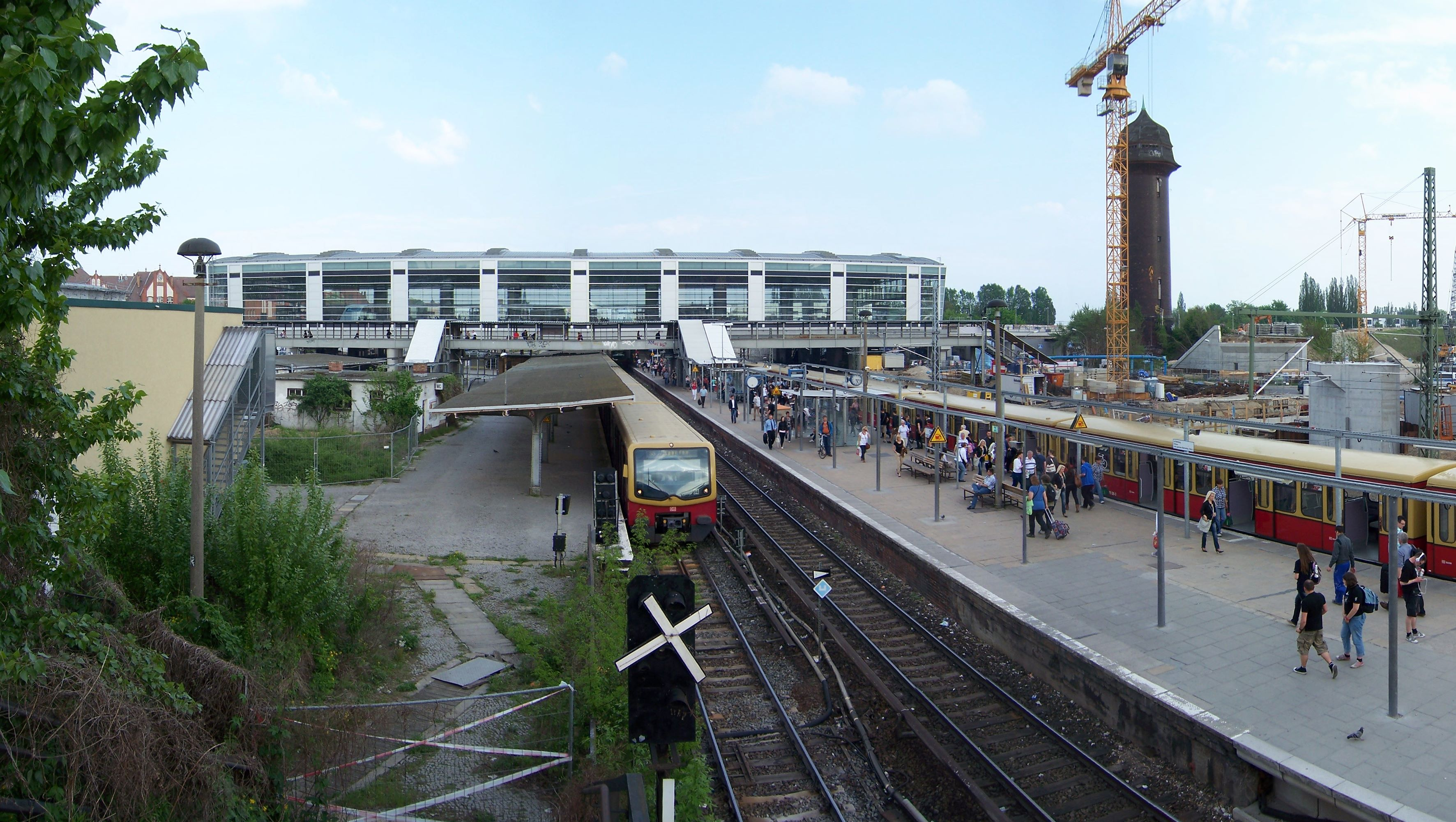
Platform D on the last day of operation, 8 May 2013

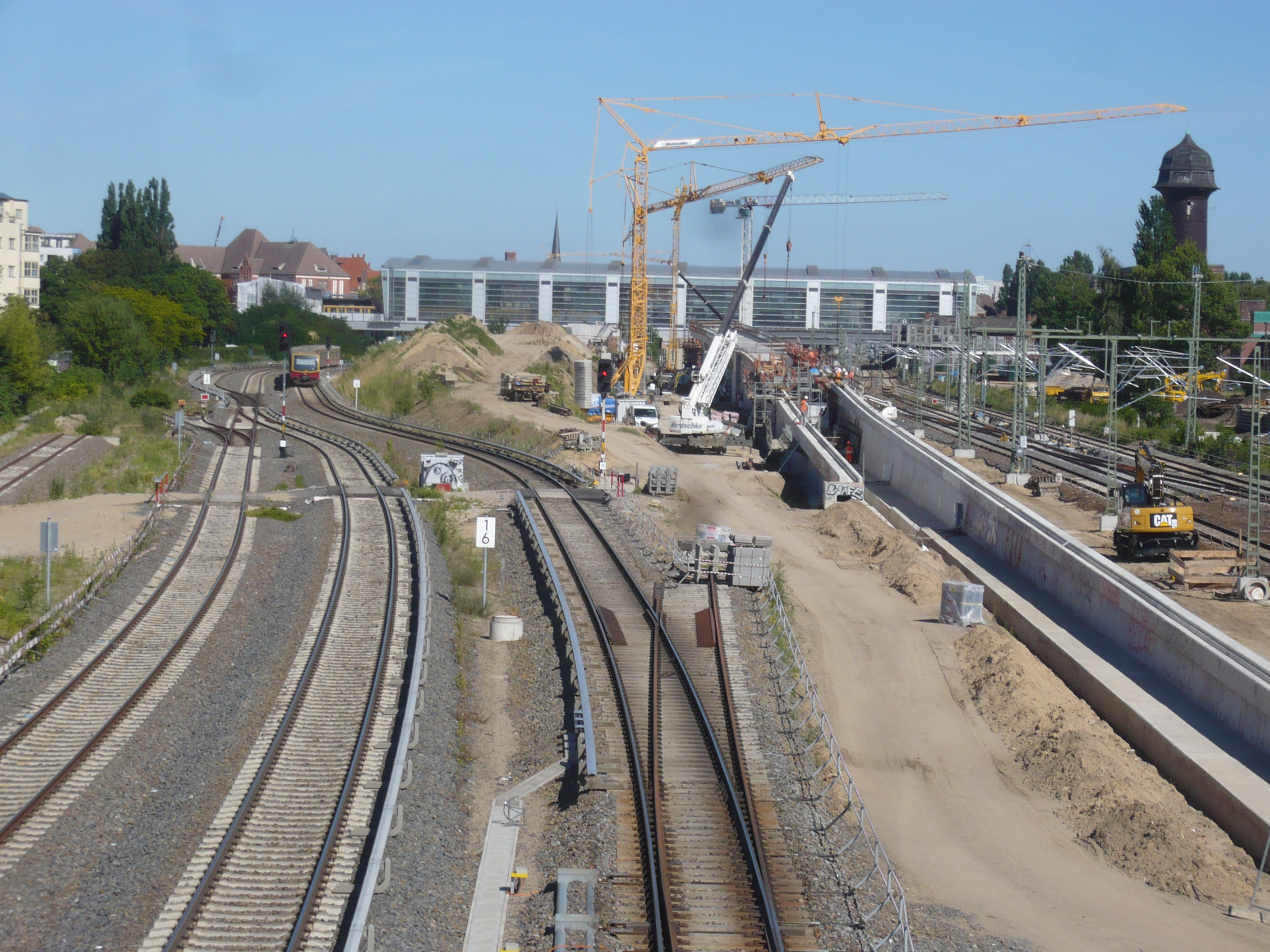
South curve construction, July 2015

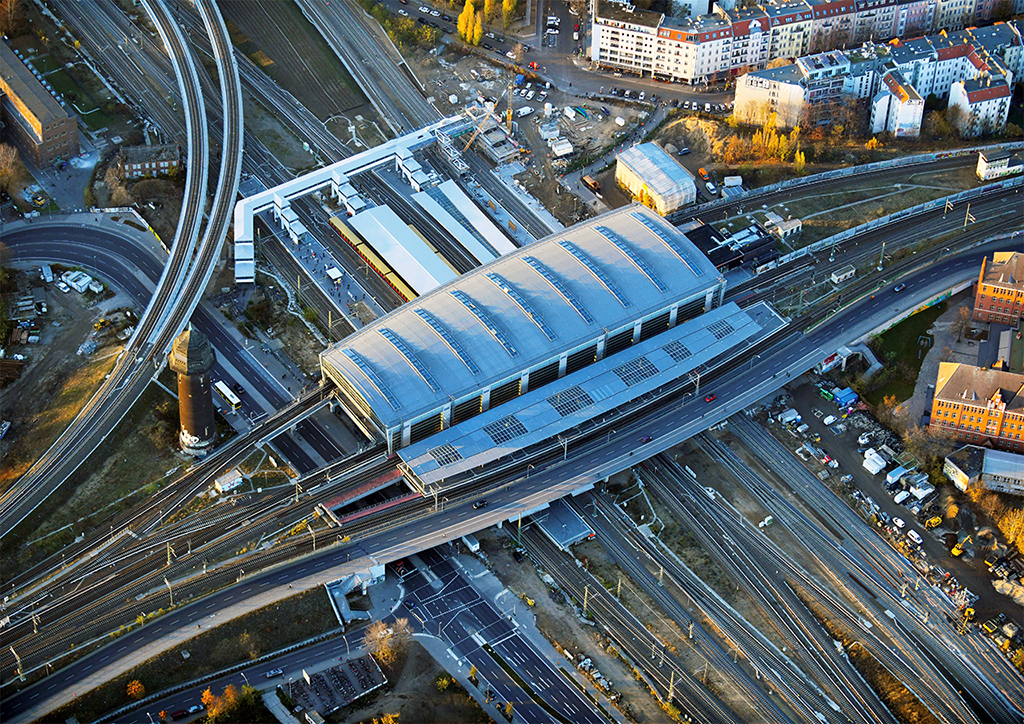
Aerial view in November 2018

Pre-construction work began in the spring and summer of 2006 with the demolition of old buildings and the removal of vegetation. The ground-breaking ceremony was scheduled for 16 January 2007 but had to be postponed. Construction started with the building of a bridge over the railway tracks for Kynaststraße, to the east of the station. In February 2008, a temporary pedestrian bridge was installed connecting the entrances of the station with platforms D and E. It replaced the old heritage-listed bridge, which had to be demolished for the construction, but was later faithfully recreated.

The old platform F on the Ringbahn was partly taken out of service on 31 August 2009 and fully closed on 11 September. The tracks of the Ringbahn were pivoted towards the future regional platform. The concourse for the S-Bahn tracks of the Ringbahn was completed in late 2011 and the station shell was commissioned on 16 April 2012.

All regional trains on the Stadtbahn now stop at the new lower regional platform on the Silesian Railway. The regional platform on the upper level was originally scheduled to go into operation in 2014. After delays in construction, it was put into operation on 13 December 2015.

The newly constructed platform Rn1 was put into operation in May 2013. It was used by S-Bahn services during the early years of the construction and now serves as a regional platform for services on the Eastern Railway. Platform D was taken out of service at the same time and rebuilt.

The regional train platform Ru on the Stadtbahn level went into operation on 30 June 2014 and was initially used during construction work on S-Bahn platform E of S-Bahn line S3.

The commissioning of the new platform D followed on 7 October 2014. S-Bahn trains running towards Lichtenberg initially stopped here on the northern edge of the platform. A reconstructed landmark supervisory building on the new platform as well as two historic roof pillars on the western platform are reminders of the old Ostkreuz. In this period, platform E went out of service and was subsequently rebuilt.

The reconstruction of the historic pedestrian bridge, which spans the western end of the lower platforms, began in summer 2016. In addition, the north curve embankment, including the bridge over the approach from Sonntagstraße, was demolished.

Driver-only operation supported by driver's cab monitor (called Zugabfertigung durch den Triebfahrzeugführer mittels Führerraum-Monitor; ZAT-FM) went into operation in August 2016 on the platform formerly used for services towards Lichtenberg (platform D).

Major parts of the reconstruction project were completed by the end of 2017. Thus, with the commissioning of the rebuilt platform E on 21 August 2017, S-Bahn line S3—with trains now running in the same direction on the opposite sides of each platform, unlike in the previous lay out—again ran through to the city centre, where at first there were considerable operational problems. Since August 2017, a new computer-based interlocking has controlled the S-Bahn tracks of the Stadtbahn level between Ostbahnhof and Rummelsburg or Nöldnerplatz, using the new Zugbeeinflussungssystem S-Bahn Berlin (Berlin S-Bahn Train Control System, ZBS) as standard.

Assembly using the incremental launch method of the steel bridge for the south curve to the Ringbahn, which consists of 22 individual parts, began in early 2015, with a total of €21.4 million invested in the construction of the new south curve. Since 10 December 2017, line S9 has run again on the newly built curve, but without stopping at Ostkreuz station. At the same time platform Ru became operational for regional services on lines RE1, RE2, RE7 and RB14. Regional services also stopped serving Karlshorst station.

The four-track infrastructure of the S-Bahn between Ostbahnhof and Ostkreuz went into operation on 6 December 2017. It and four S-Bahn platform edges have been used in scheduled operations, using directional operation, since 9 December.

The inauguration of the pedestrian bridge and platforms Rn1 and Rn2 on the Eastern Railway took place on 9 December 2018. Since then, RB26 services and some RB12 and RB25 services have started and stopped at these platforms. The reconstruction of the historic entrance building at the northern end of the pedestrian bridge and the layout of the forecourts had not yet begun at this time.

The commissioning of the new tram line was originally planned for 2016. In autumn 2015, 2019 was mentioned as the opening date of the tram line. The project has aroused opposition among some residents; when comments were sought for planning approval in January 2018, more than 1000 objections were received, and construction was therefore delayed. In early 2021 it was further delayed to allow for additional public comment, with the projected completion date being deferred from the end of 2023 to 2025.

==== Costs ====
The planned costs amounted to 726 million marks in 1998.

According to Deutsche Bahn's medium-term planning in April 2007, €62.6 million would be invested in the project by 2010. The investment proposed for 2010 in the federal transport infrastructure plan (Investitionsrahmenplan bis 2010 für die Verkehrsinfrastruktur des Bundes) provided for the expenditure of €143.1 million on the project (2006 costs). By 2005, a total of €9.6 million had been spent on it. Between 2006 and 2010, federal funding of €75.2 million was to be invested in it. Beyond this period there was to be a financial contribution of €58.4 million (federal funding from 2011, DB funding and third-party contributions since 2006).

The cost was estimated to be €411 million in 2006. In 2013 the planned cost of the overall project (including the reconstruction of Warschauer Straße station) was set at €411 million, including an additional €6 million for new work at Ostbahnhof.

The roof of the upper regional platform is being funded by the government of Berlin with €1.5 million from funds for overcoming the operational constraints of the Berlin S-Bahn.

The work carried out to enable the extension of the A 100, costing €16 million, was financed by the federal government.

== Infrastructure ==
Ostkreuz Station includes several platforms, some of which are no longer in use or have been dismantled.

=== Platforms (before 2006) ===
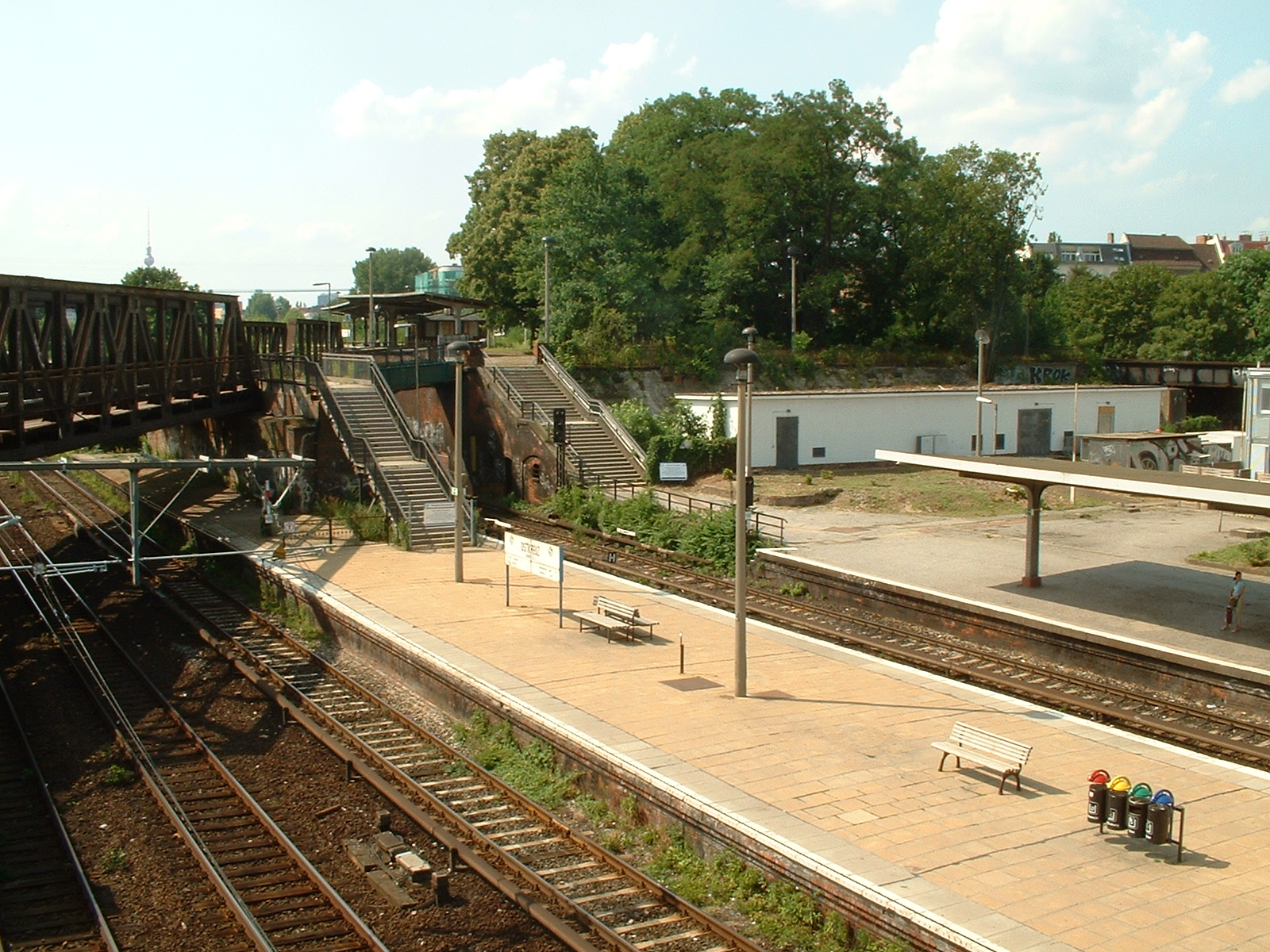
Platform E, and D behind, with connecting curve to the southern Ring and platform A above, 2006

The original Stralau-Rummelsburg station opened in 1882 mainly served suburban traffic on the connecting curves between the Stadtbahn and the Ringbahn. There were also platforms on the long-distance tracks of the Silesian Railway and the Eastern Railway, which separated to the east of the station. Presumably, there was an island platform on the northern track and an intermediate platform on the southern track. In addition, there was a freight track of the Eastern Railway to the north and a freight track of the Silesian Railway to the south of the remaining tracks.

At the beginning of the 20th century, the long-distance and suburban railways were separated by the Eastern Railway and the Silesian Railway. The lower platforms D and E on the routes to Lichtenberg and Erkner and the upper Ringbahn platform F date back to this time. The tracks of the upper platforms (A, B, C and F) were about 6 metres (19 ft 8 in) above the level of the lower platforms (D and E).

The long-distance tracks of the Silesian Railway were built south of the lower platforms, and were not provided with a platform in Ostkreuz. The long-distance tracks of the Ringbahn are located east of the S-Bahn platform. Before the rebuilding there were in addition to the two long-distance tracks still connections to the brake plant in Stralau and the Osthafen (East Harbour). The siding to the harbour crossed the tracks of the Ringbahn in a tunnel to the south of the station.

==== Platform A ====
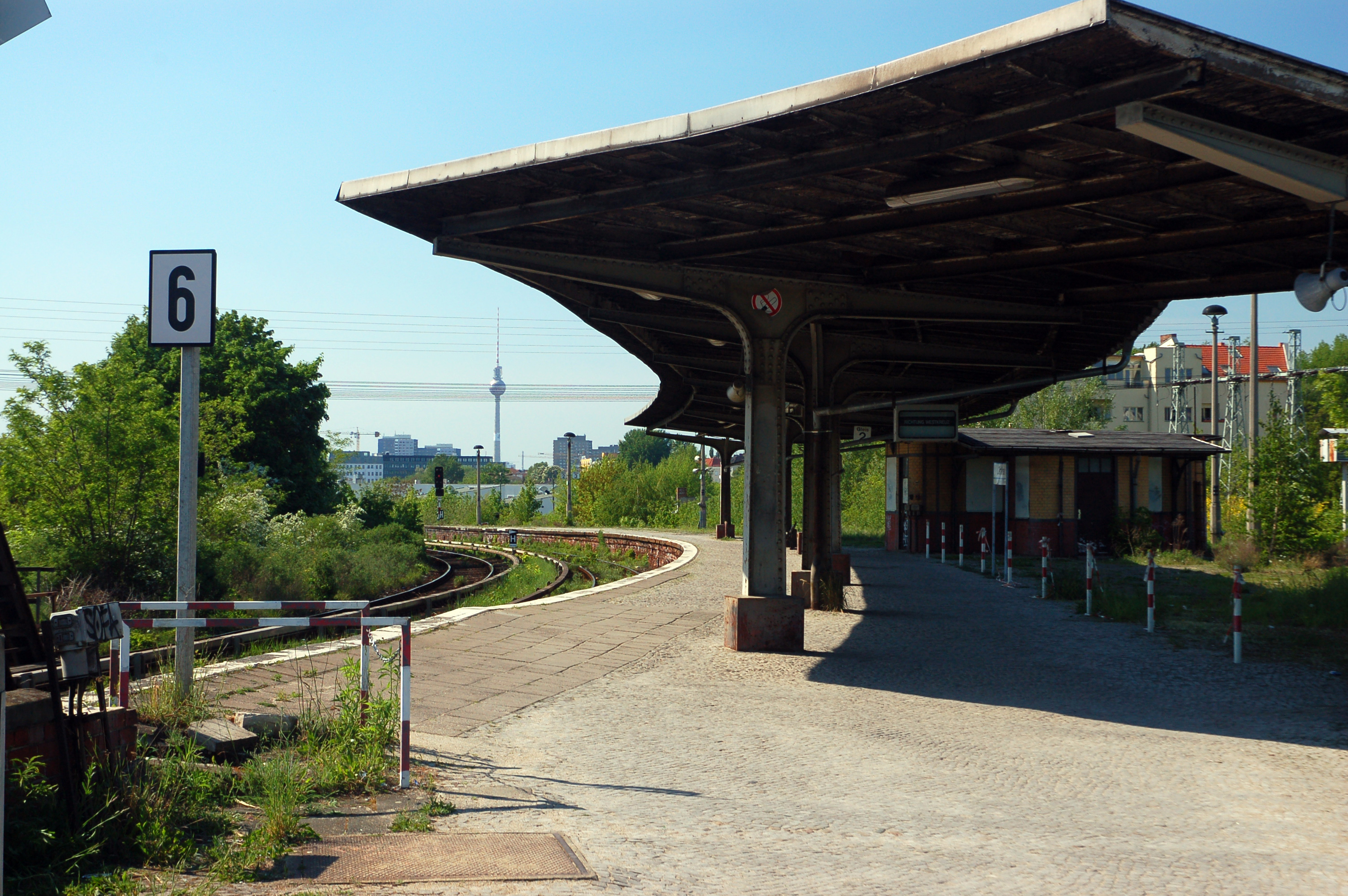
Platform A, now demolished

This platform was in operation from 1882 to 2009 with a few reconstructions. This triangular platform was on an embankment west of platforms D and E between the curved lines connecting the Stadtbahn with the Ringbahn. The platform canopy was supported by one-piece, riveted steel girders. Trains from the Stadtbahn to the northern Ringbahn stopped on the northern side of the platform and trains from the southern Ringbahn to the Stadtbahn stopped on the southern side. Scheduled passenger traffic to the north ended in 1994, although until 2006 there were still occasional special and diverted services. Operations on the southern side of the platform ended on 28 August 2009. The curve to the southern Ringbahn was removed for the station reconstruction and later rebuilt without a platform.

Originally ramps ran from the Simplonstraße in the north and the Markgrafendamm in the south to the platform and the later entrance building. With the construction of the pedestrian bridge and the two entrance buildings in Sonntagstraße and Markgrafendamm, the platform was accessible from the bridge via branches off it. After the destruction of the bridges, the platform was accessible only by stairs from platforms D and E.

==== Platforms B and C ====
The S-Bahn platforms were located on the outsides of the connecting curves. Platform B was on the track connecting the Stadtbahn to the northern Ringbahn, while platform C was on the southern curve connecting towards Treptower Park. They were connected to platform A by a short tunnel.

Platform C was built in 1895/1896 for the Berlin trade exposition in Treptower Park. It was taken out of service on 12 April 1966 due to disrepair, as was platform B in the same year. Trains running towards the southern ring and from the northern ring then ran without stopping, while trains running in the respective opposite directions continued to stop at platform A. Platform B was demolished in 1970, as was platform C in November 1978.

==== Platform D ====
The S-Bahn platform was at ground level on the S-Bahn tracks of the Eastern Railway running from the Stadtbahn in the east to Lichtenberg in the west. It lay between the wedge-shaped platform A in the east and the Ringbahn platform F in the west, with no platforms on top of each other. Due to the spreading of the tracks from Lichtenberg to accommodate the connecting curves from the Ringbahn the platform was unusually wide. The station building, which stood at its western end, was destroyed in 1945.

The original canopy of platform D was supported by one-piece, riveted steel girders. Platform D was taken out of service on 8 May 2013 and was subsequently replaced by a new building.

==== Platform E ====
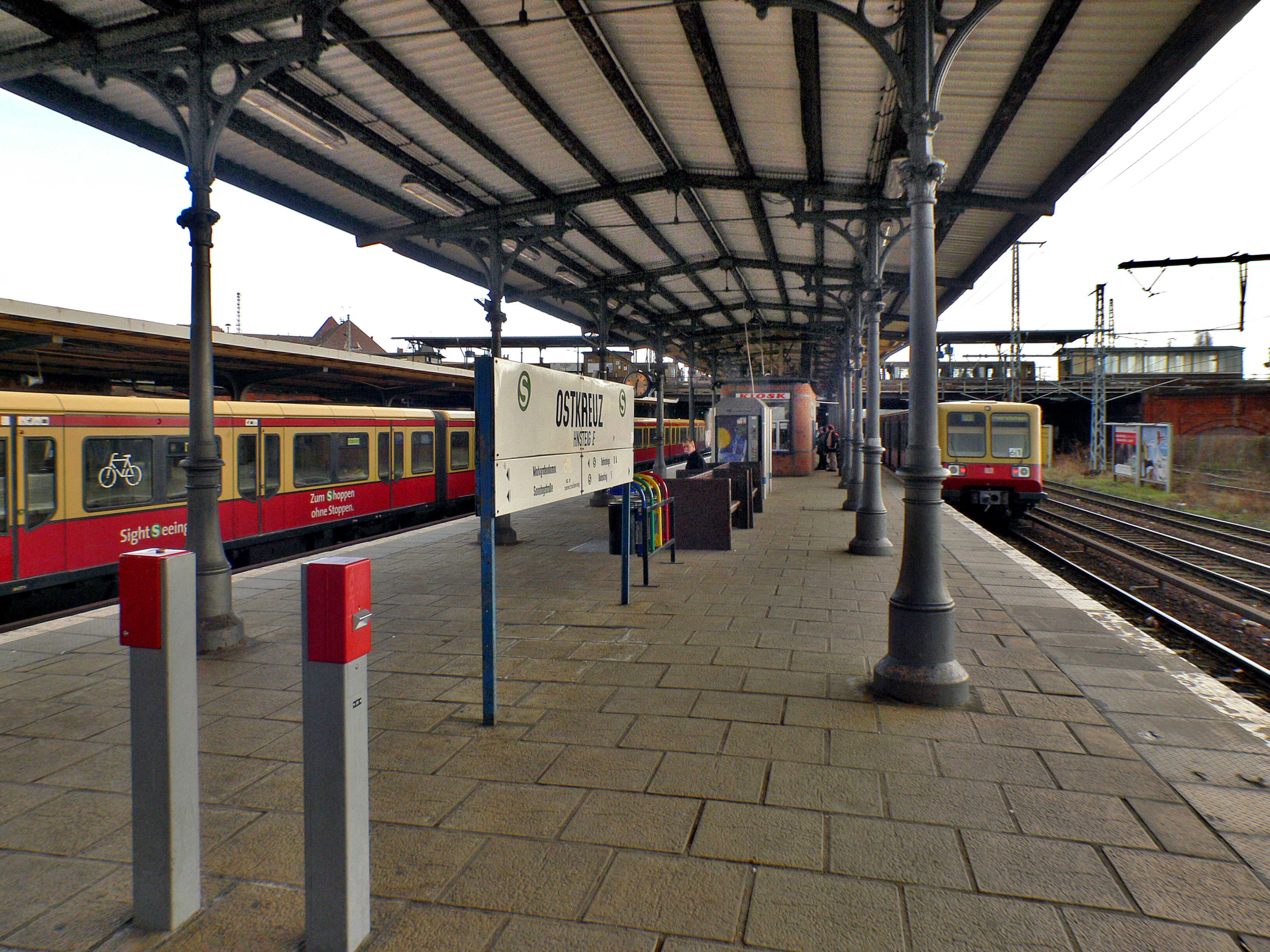
Platform E, 2007

This S-Bahn platform is also located at street level and parallel to platform D on the S-Bahn tracks of the Silesian Railway to/from Erkner. To the west the tracks connect to the Stadtbahn. The original platform roof was supported by paired columns of cast iron in Jugendstil design. It was taken out of service in July 2014 and was subsequently replaced by a new structure.

==== Platform F ====
This S-Bahn platform of the Ringbahn was originally located on a bridge over the tracks of the Stadtbahn and was orientated north–south. The original platform roof was supported by paired columns of cast iron in Jugendstil design. The platform was demolished after the opening of the regional platform in 2009 and replaced in the following years by a new structure.

=== Platforms after the reconstruction ===
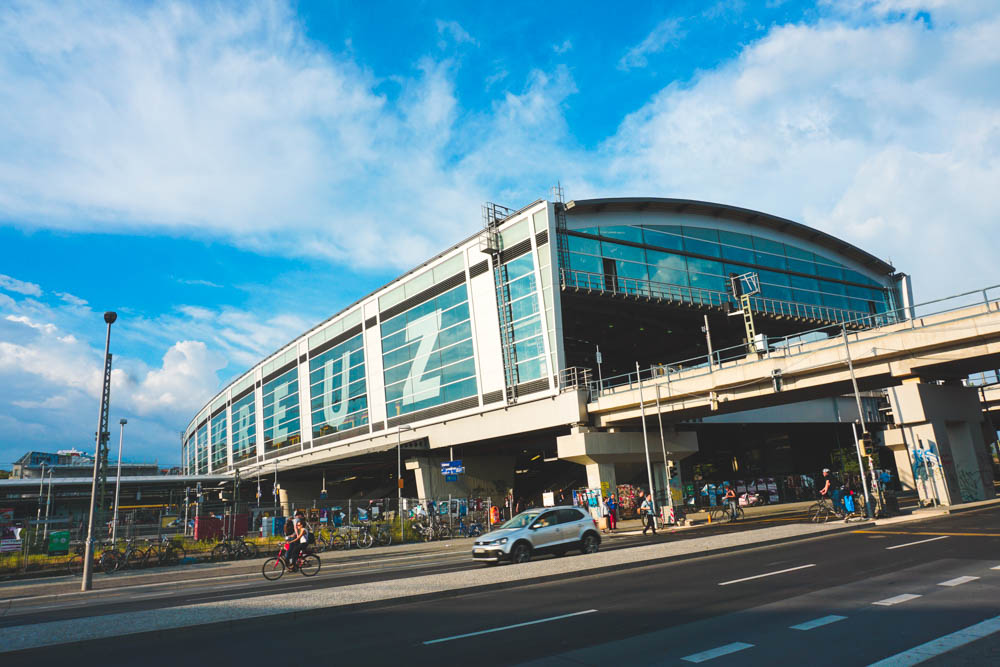
Ostkreuz station, 2018

The new lower platforms D and E are clearly shifted to the east and partly run under the platforms of the Ringbahn, but are well separated from the connecting curve, which was also given no platform for this reason. The S-Bahn platform on the Ringbahn was rebuilt in about the old location. The station is supplemented by several new Regionalbahn services.

==== Platform D ====
The new platform D is a platform for west-running services for trains from Erkner and Lichtenberg towards the city center. The observation shed and the platform canopy were rebuilt on the basis of the historic shape of the old platform D. It was opened in October 2014 for trains running towards Lichtenberg only. Trains running towards the city center have stopped there since August 2017.

==== Platform E ====
S-Bahn trains running to the eastern suburbs have stopped at the new platform E since August 2017. The observation shed and the platform canopy here were also rebuilt in the style of the old platform.

==== Platform F ====
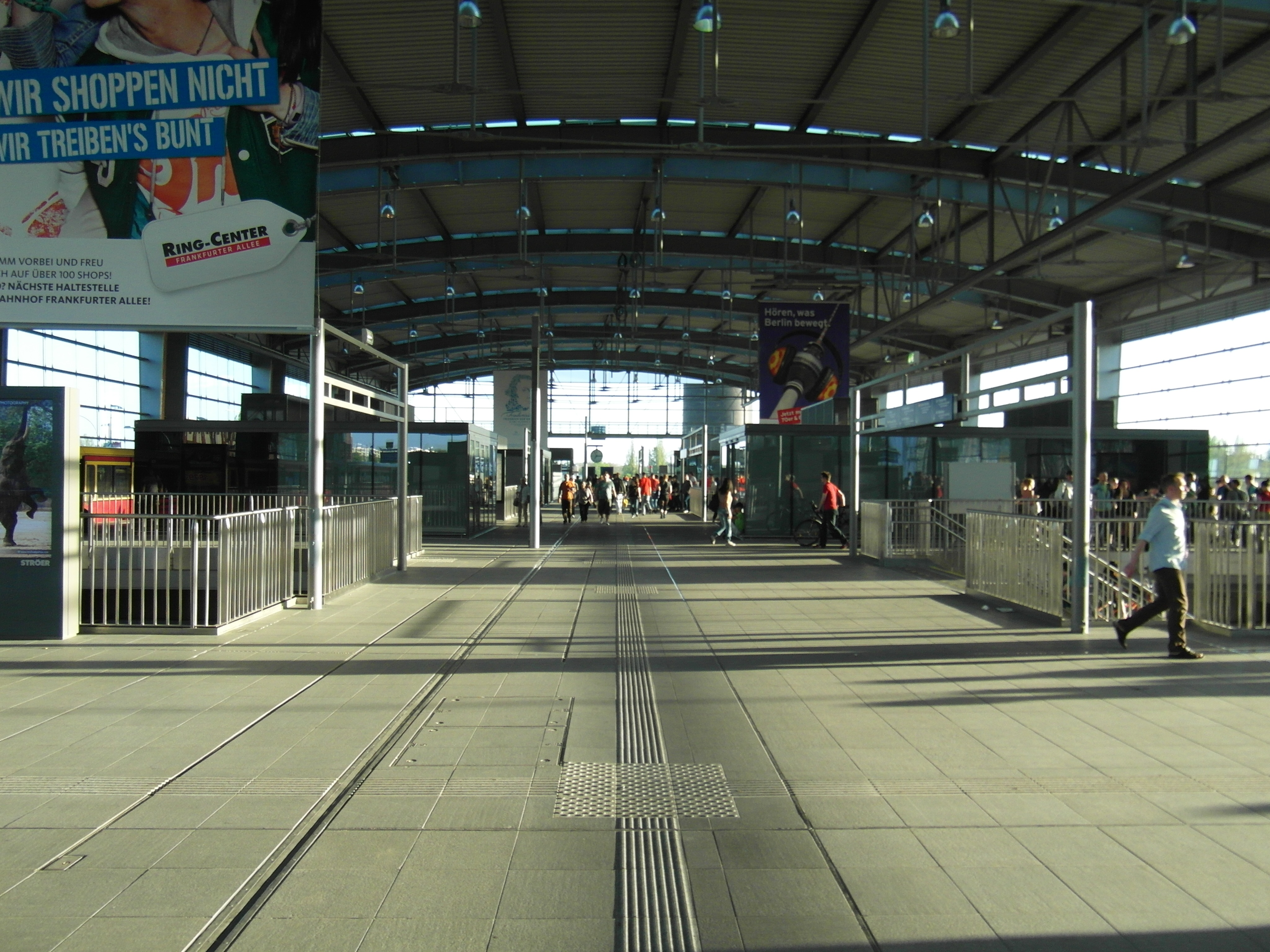
Ringbahn hall, 2012

The S-Bahn platform of the Ringbahn was built in a similar position as its predecessor, but significantly wider. The new bridges for the track, the new platform and a platform hall were built by 2011. The platform was reopened on 16 April 2012. The west side of the circular railway hall has borne the lettering OSTKREUZ since August 2017.

Since mid-2016, train operations on platform F have used the driver's cab monitor system (Zugabfertigung durch den Triebfahrzeugführer mittels Führerraum-Monitor; ZAT-FM).

==== Regionalbahn high-level platform (Ro) ====
The Regionalbahn upper platform (Deutsche Bahn abbreviates it "Ro", standing for Regionalbahnsteig oben) was built in 2009 as a regional platform on the Ringbahn. It was used temporarily by S-Bahn services until 30 March 2012, when it was taken out of service for further work. It was opened for regional traffic on 13 December 2015.

==== Regionalbahn low-level platform (Ru) ====
The Regionalbahn lower platform (Regionalbahnsteig unten) south of the S-Bahn tracks has been served since 10 December 2017 by regional traffic running on the Silesian Railway to and from the Stadtbahn. Occasionally long-distance trains stop there. After its establishment, it was provisionally used from July 2014 for S-Bahn services towards Erkner and it was then closed for rebuilding.

==== Regionalbahn platform on the Eastern Railway (Rn1) ====
The first of two planned Regionalbahn platforms north of the S-Bahn tracks was built from 2012 and went into operation provisionally on 13 May 2013. It is an outer platform at the northern entrance from Sonntagstraße. S-Bahn trains running from Lichtenberg to the city stopped there during the construction phase. Regional services on the Eastern Railway started stopping there at the end of 2018.

==== Regionalbahn platform on the Eastern Railway (Rn2) ====
This platform, which is south of Rn1, was also opened at the end of 2018 for regional services that begin or end at Ostkreuz, coming from or going towards Lichtenberg.

=== Entrance building ===
The entrance building built in 1903 was on the west side of platform D at the entrance to the oldest part of the station and near platform A. It was destroyed during the Second World War. Its location was still visible on the west side of platform D, which is unusually wide in this area. Small access buildings were later built at the entrances from Sonntagsstraße and Markgrafendamm.

=== Pedestrian bridge ===
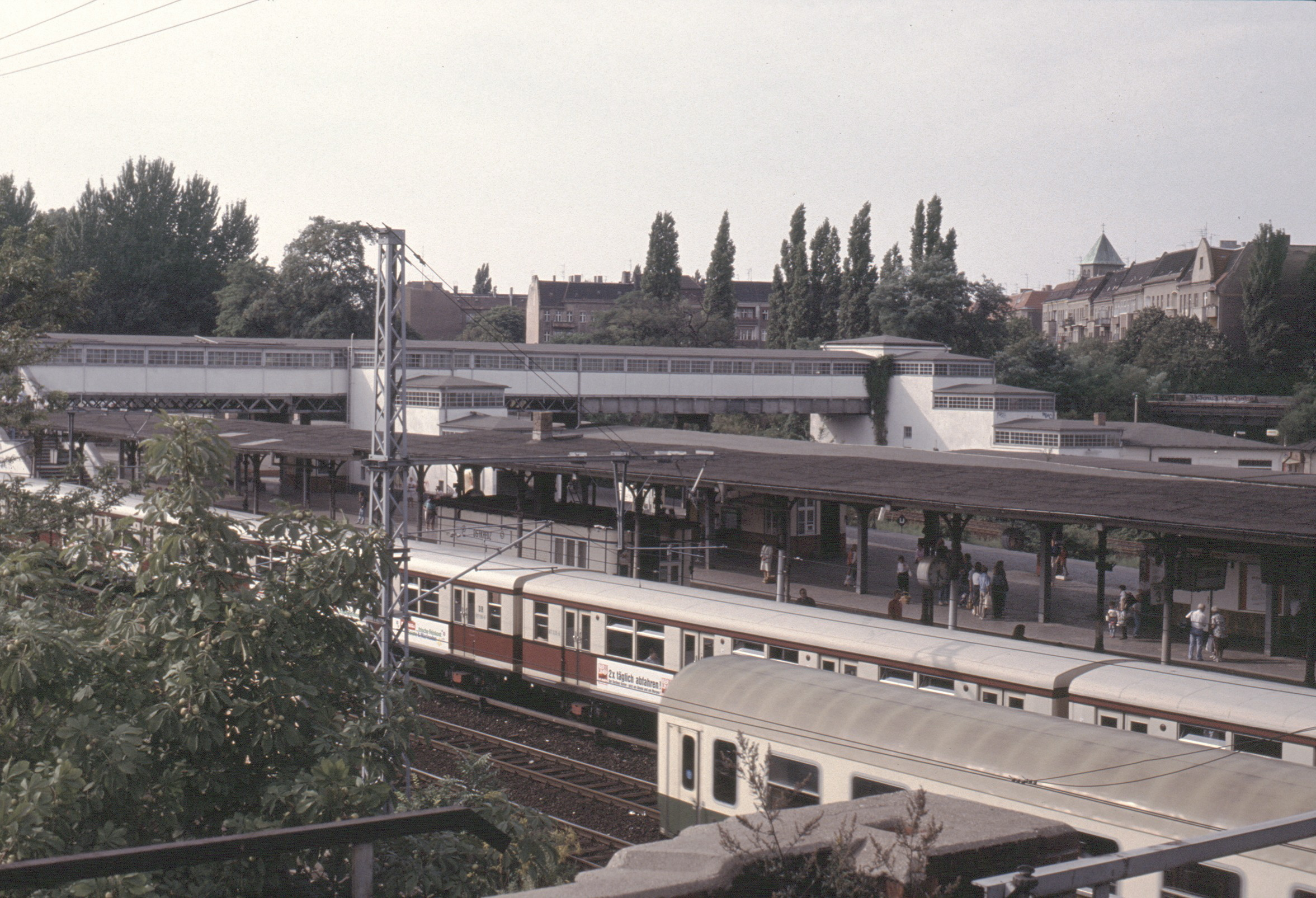
Original pedestrian bridge over platforms E (front) and D, 1992

Replacement bridge, January 2026

The covered pedestrian bridge, built according to the plans of Richard Brademann in 1923 and 1926, connected to platforms D and E close to their western end and had exits to Hauptstraße and to Sonntagstraße. Originally there was also a direct connection from the bridge over a pier to platform A, which was destroyed during the Second World War. In the course of the station renovation, the bridge was demolished and replaced by a temporary pedestrian bridge. From April 2016 to December 2018, a new structure was built at the same place as a replica of the original bridge with additional connections to the newly added platforms Rn2 and Ru including preserved historical bridge supports and lattice girders in the area of platform D. The staircases and the supports and abutments were built in reinforced concrete, along with the Sonntagstraße staircase, which is to be provided with a toilet block on the ground floor. The windows were built to reflect the historical design, but in metal with safety glazing that will meet current standards. The superstructure is covered with asphalt and the steps with natural stone. The first part of the newly constructed bridge went into operation on 3 September 2017, initially as a connection from Hauptstraße to platforms E and D. The connection to platform Ru was opened at the timetable change in December 2017. The second part of the bridge to Sonntagstraße went into operation in December 2018.

Another pedestrian overpass ran alongside the tracks of the connecting curves from Sonntagstraße past platform A and the old entrance building to Markgrafendamm. In contrast to the other pedestrian bridge, it served mainly as a link between the urban areas on both sides and was outside the controlled access area of the station, so it was usable for travellers without tickets. During the Second World War it was destroyed with the entrance building.

=== Water tower ===
The water tower, July 2026

Immediately south of the station is a 50-metre (164 ft 1 in)-high water tower. This was built from 1909 to 1912 to the design of Karl Cornelius and served to supply water to the many steam locomotives running from Ostkreuz. Its round trunk is veneered with bricks that are glazed violet. A cylindrical pressure-resistant water tank sits on this; it holds 400 cubic metres (14,000 cu ft) and is fully integrated with the roof. The steep pitched roof and the slated polygonal dome exhibit the influence of Art Nouveau. The water tower is now a symbol of Ostkreuz and a highly visible building. It is listed as a monument.

=== Rail officials' housing ===
==== Northern officials' residence (Sonntagstraße 37) ====
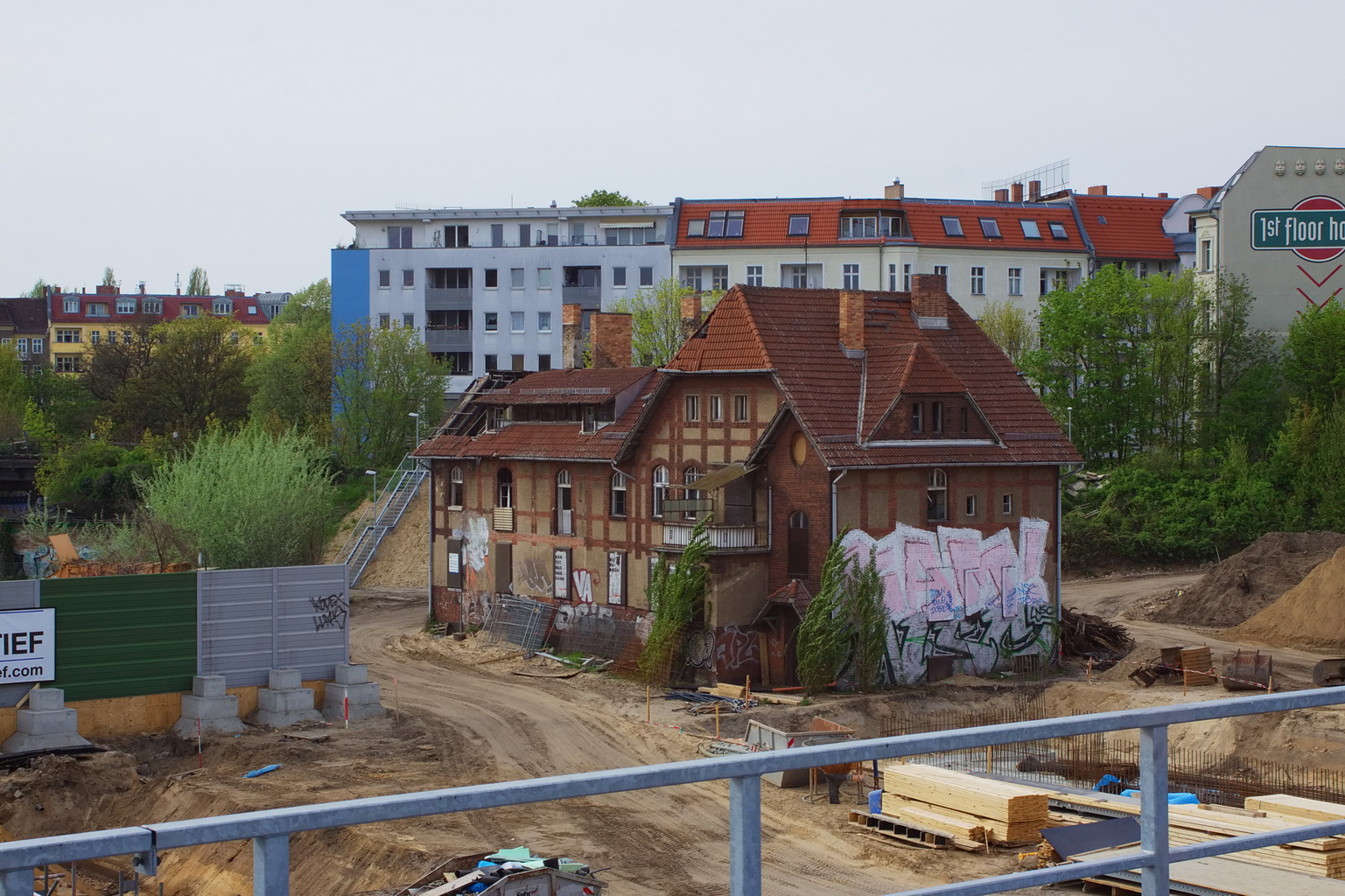
Northern officials' residence at Sonntagstraße 37

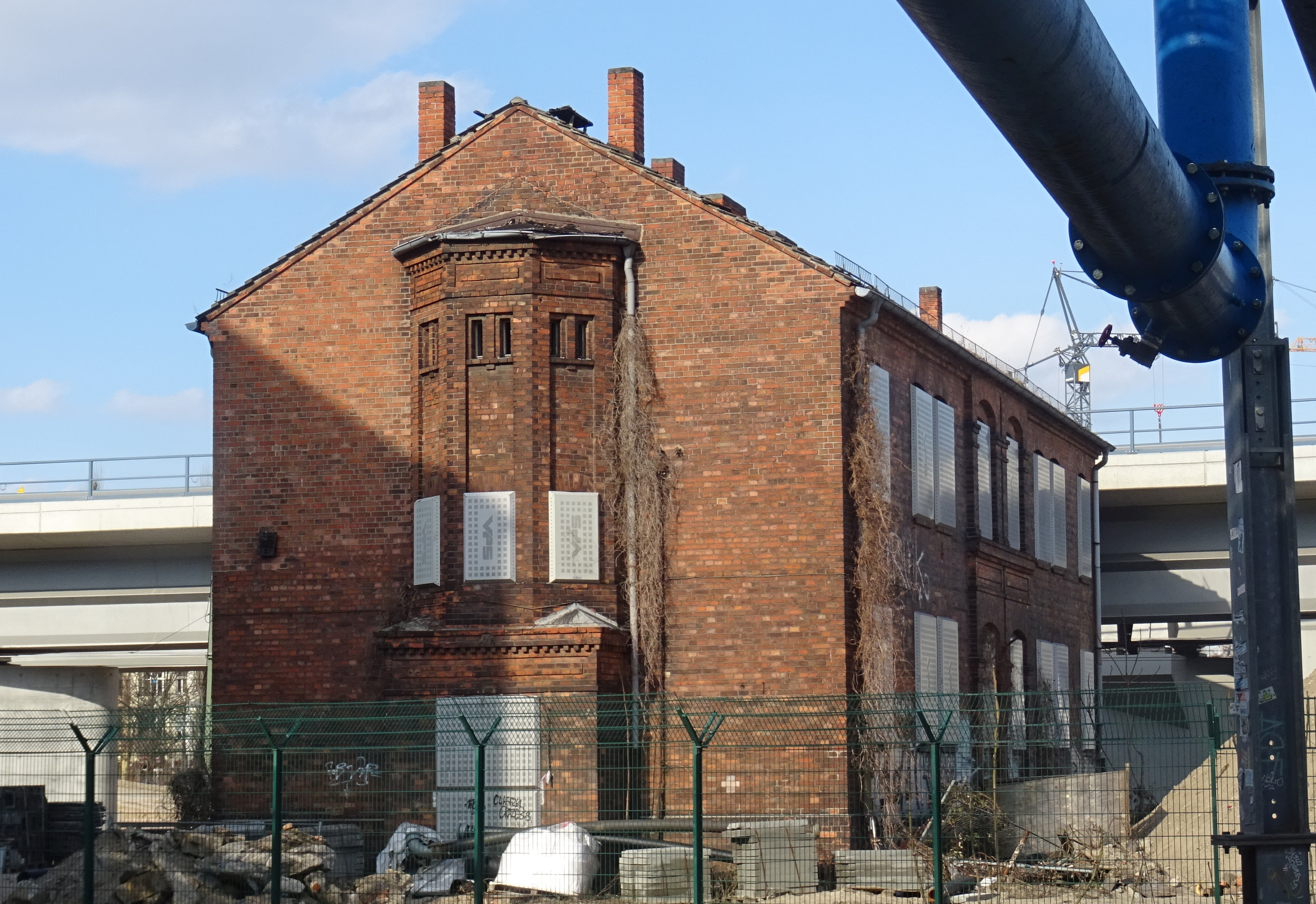
Southern officials' residence at Markgrafendamm 24a

A two-storey hipped-roof residence for railway officials was built in 1910 in the triangle between the curve to the north Ringbahn, the Stadtbahn and the Ringbahn. Since 1995, it has been listed along with large parts of the station. Its attic burned down in 1998. An outline application by Deutsche Bahn in 2008 for the development of the site was rejected by the conservation authorities. After receiving no undertakings from Deutsche Bahn to protect it, the heritage protection authority adopted an order in March 2010 requiring measures to protect the building from the penetration of rain water and the effects of storms and vandalism. In November 2010, Deutsche Bahn began work for the conservation of the house. The building was completely surrounded by scaffolding and given a solid metal canopy. The repair of the officials’ house is not expected before the end of construction at the station because it would not be practical to use the house during the construction.

==== Southern officials' residence (Markgrafendamm 24a) ====
Another official's residence, now a listed building, has been preserved to the south of the tracks next to the rectifier plant. It was built in 1900 as a two-family house within a small housing estate for railway staff, begun in 1881 and otherwise not preserved. It was unused as of August 2018.

=== Heritage listing ===
The Ostkreuz station building complex before the reconstruction "possesses high historical value due to the good state of preservation as well as the abundance of original components such as connecting bridge, signal boxes, viaduct arches, service and waiting rooms." (state heritage office citation) and the whole complex was therefore heritage listed, but divided between two individual heritage complexes.

This ensemble is divided into the following 14 heritage items:

Heritage item	Construction year	Conservation status
Bridges of the Ringbahn	1872–1903	Withdrawn
Bridges of the southern curve	1930	Withdrawn
Bridges of the northern curve	1882	Withdrawn
Southern entrance building	1923	Withdrawn
Northern entrance building	1923	Withdrawn
Ringbahn platform F	1903	Withdrawn
Signal box	About 1903	Withdrawn
Footbridge	1923–1926	Withdrawn
Platform E	1902	Withdrawn
Platform D	1903	Withdrawn
Platform A	1882–1907	Withdrawn
Northern officials residence	After 1900	Retained
Water tower	1912	Retained
Southern officials residence	1872 (?)	Retained

In the course of the reconstruction, the historic core of the station has been lost despite the preservation of listed buildings. Individual, stand-alone measures attempt to selectively mark this loss. Thus, the newly constructed canopies of platforms D and E as well as the newly built pedestrian bridge borrow in their design from the original buildings. On platform D, two surviving roof supports were integrated into the new structure at the western end, but do not have a supporting function. The roof pillars of platform E are newly made historicising replicas, along with the two service buildings on these platforms.

Also protected as a listed building, although not part of the building ensembles described in the planning approval processes for the reconstruction, is a rectifying plant designed by Richard Brademann at the Markgrafendamm next to the Civil Servants' Residence South.

== Train services ==
The station is served by the following service(s):

=== Long-distance services ===
Line	Route	Frequency
IC 17	Binz – Stralsund – Eberswalde – Berlin Ostkreuz – Dresden	Once a day on summer Saturdays

=== Regional services ===
Line	Route	Interval	Platform
FEX; Flughafen-Express	Berlin Hbf – Gesundbrunnen – Berlin Ostkreuz – BER Airport	Late night only	high
RE 1	Magdeburg – Magdeburg-Neustadt – Güsen – Genthin – Brandenburg – Potsdam – Berlin-Wannsee – Berlin-Charlottenburg – Berlin Zoo – Berlin – Berlin Friedrichstraße – Berlin Alexanderplatz – Berlin Ost – Berlin Ostkreuz – Erkner – Fürstenwalde – Frankfurt – Eisenhüttenstadt (– Guben – Cottbus)	20 min	low
RE 2	Wismar – Schwerin – Wittenberge – Berlin-Spandau – Berlin Zoo – Berlin – Berlin Friedrichstraße – Berlin Alexanderplatz – Berlin Ostkreuz – Königs Wusterhausen – Lübben – Lübbenau – Cottbus	60 min	low
RE 7	Dessau – Bad Belzig – Beelitz-Heilstätten – Michendorf – Potsdam Medienstadt Babelsberg – Berlin-Wannsee – Berlin-Charlottenburg – Berlin Zoo – Berlin – Berlin Friedrichstraße – Berlin Alexanderplatz – Berlin Ost – Berlin Ostkreuz – Königs Wusterhausen – Lübben (Spreewald) – Lübbenau (Spreewald) – Senftenberg	60 min	low
RB 12	Berlin Ostkreuz – Berlin-Lichtenberg – Oranienburg – Löwenberg – Zehdenick – Templin – Templin Stadt	60 min	high/ low
RB 24	Eberswalde– Bernau – Hohenschönhausen – Lichtenberg – Berlin Ostkreuz – Berlin-Schöneweide – Schönefeld – BER Airport – Blankenfelde – Rangsdorf – Zossen – Wünsdorf-Waldstadt	60 min	high
RB 25	Berlin Ostkreuz – Berlin-Lichtenberg – Ahrensfelde – Werneuchen	60 min	high/ low
RB 26	Berlin Ostkreuz – Berlin-Lichtenberg – Berlin-Mahlsdorf – Strausberg – Müncheberg – Seelow-Gusow – Werbig – Küstrin-Kietz – Kostrzyn (Küstrin) (only in the peak: – Gorzów Wielkopolski)	60 min	low
RB 32	Oranienburg – Hohenschönhausen – Lichtenberg – Berlin Ostkreuz – Schöneweide – BER Airport – Birkengrund – Ludwigsfelde	60 min	high

=== S-Bahn services ===
- Berlin S-Bahn services Spandau – Westkreuz – Hauptbahnhof – Alexanderplatz – Ostbahnhof – Karlshorst – Köpenick – Erkner
- Berlin S-Bahn services (Ring Clockwise) Ostkreuz - Treptower Park - Hermannstraße - Südkreuz - Innsbrucker Platz - Westkreuz - Westend - Jungfernheide - Gesundbrunnen - Ostkreuz
- Berlin S-Bahn services (Ring Anti-clockwise) Ostkreuz - Gesundbrunnen - Jungfernheide - Westend - Westkreuz - Innsbrucker Platz - Südkreuz - Hermannstraße - Treptower Park - Ostkreuz
- Berlin S-Bahn services Westkreuz – Hauptbahnhof – Alexanderplatz – Ostbahnhof – Lichtenberg – Strausberg Nord
- Berlin S-Bahn services Potsdam – Wannsee – Westkreuz – Hauptbahnhof – Alexanderplatz – Ostbahnhof – Lichtenberg – Ahrensfelde
- Berlin S-Bahn services Warschauer Straße – Lichtenberg – Wartenberg
- Berlin S-Bahn services Birkenwerder – Pankow – Prenzlauer Allee – Ostkreuz – Schöneweide – Grünau – Zeuthen
- Berlin S-Bahn services Pankow – Prenzlauer Allee – Ostkreuz – Schöneweide

== Connections ==
Bus routes 194, 347 and N94, operated by Berliner Verkehrsbetriebe, stop at the entrance from Hauptstraße/Markgrafendamm.

=== Surroundings ===
There are several restaurants and pubs around Ostkreuz, mainly in Sonntagstraße, that make the area northwest of Ostkreuz a major entertainment destination in Friedrichshain. From 2000 to 2006, under the URBAN II initiative of the European Union, work was carried out in the Ostkreuz neighbourhood. This includes the transformation of wasteland between Persiusstraße, Laskerstraße and Markgrafendamm to Bürgergarten Laskerwiese, one of the neighbourhood Intercultural Gardens in Berlin.
