= Kostrzyn railway station =

Railway station in Kostrzyn nad Odrą, Poland

Kostrzyn
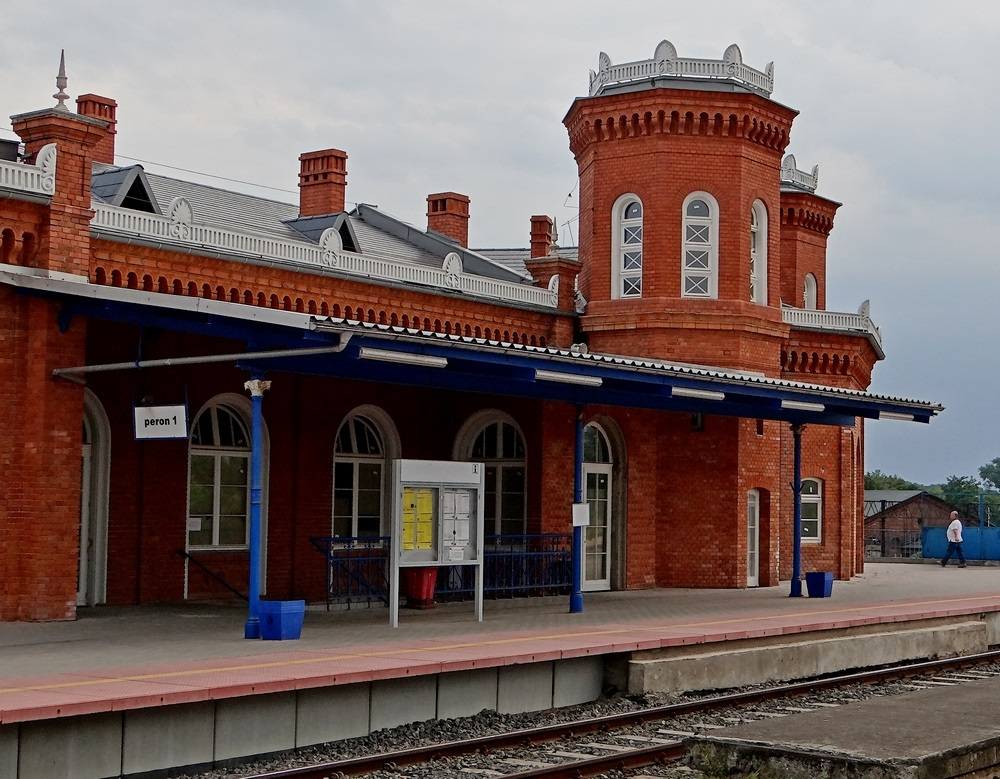
- Kostrzyn railway station

General information
- Location: Kostrzyn nad Odrą, Lubusz Voivodeship; Poland
- Coordinates: 52.5915°N 14.6472°E
- System: Railway Station
- Operator: PKP; Polregio; Arriva/Niederbarnimer Eisenbahn
- Lines: 203: Tczew–Kostrzyn railway 273: Wrocław–Szczecin railway 410: Grzmiąca–Kostrzyn railway (closed)
- Platforms: 5

Other information
- Fare zone: VBB: 5375

History
- Opened: 1857; 169 years ago
- Rebuilt: 2012-2014
- Former names: Cüstrin Vorstadt 1857-1900; Cüstrin Neustadt Hauptbahnhof 1901-1930; Küstrin Neustadt Hauptbahnhof 1931-1945; Kostrzyn n/Odrą 1945-1946

Services
Preceding station	PKP Intercity	Following station
Witnica towards Gdynia Główna	TLK	Terminus
Preceding station	Polregio	Following station
Namyślin towards Szczecin Główny	PR	Ługi Górzyckie towards Zielona Góra
Terminus	PR	Dąbroszyn towards Poznań Główny
Preceding station	Niederbarnimer Eisenbahn	Following station
Küstrin-Kietz towards Berlin Ostkreuz	RB 26	Terminus
Location
- Location within Poland

Kostrzyn railway station is a railway station serving the town of Kostrzyn nad Odrą, in the Lubusz Voivodeship, Poland. The station is located on the Tczew–Kostrzyn railway, Wrocław–Szczecin railway and the now closed Grzmiąca–Kostrzyn railway.

It is a unique station, one of two of its kind in Poland, with two levels of platforms oriented in different directions: north-south (Wrocław–Szczecin) and east–west (Tczew–Kostrzyn).

The train services are operated by PKP, Polregio, Arriva and Niederbarnimer Eisenbahn.

== History ==
The station building was built between 1872 and 1874 and is one of the few buildings in town not destroyed during World War II. The station was repaired after the war. In 2012 the station underwent a major renovation, which was completed in Autumn 2014. The historic facade of the building was restored during these works.

== Train services ==
The station is served by the following service(s):

- Intercity services Świnoujście – Szczecin – Kostrzyn – Rzepin – Zielona Góra – Wrocław
- Regional services (R) Szczecin – Kostrzyn – Rzepin – Zielona Góra
- Regional services (R) Berlin Ostkreuz – Kostrzyn (– Gorzów Wielkopolski – Krzyż)
- Regional services (R) Kostrzyn – Gorzów Wielkopolski – Krzyż (– Poznań)
- Intercity services (TLK) Gdynia Główna — Kostrzyn

From 2004 to 2019, the station welcomed a large number of extra trains from all over the country as part of the annual Woodstock Festival.
