= Berlin-Hohenschönhausen station =

Railway station in Berlin, Germany

Berlin Hohenschönhausen
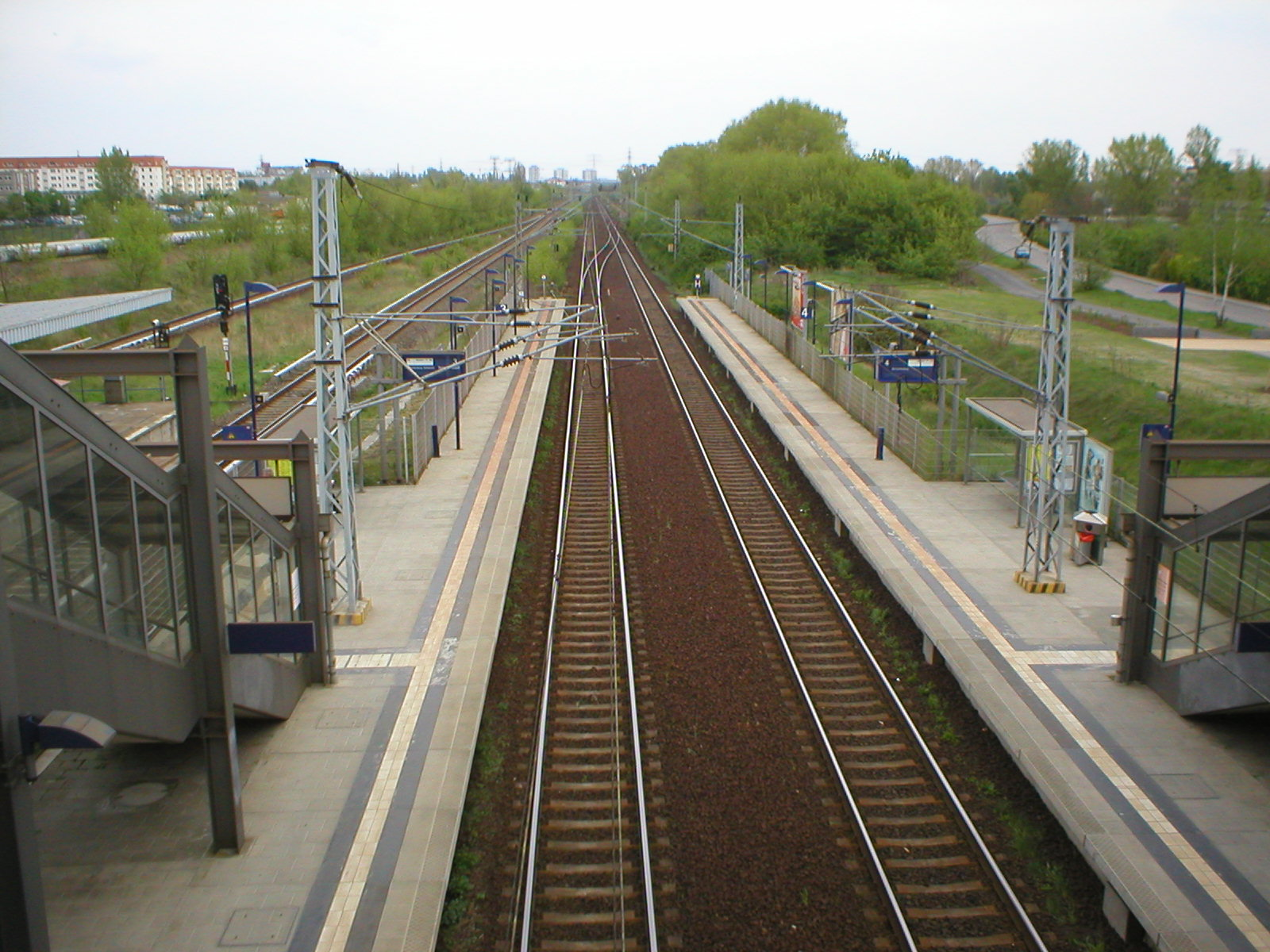

General information
- Location: Lichtenberg, Berlin, Berlin; Germany
- Coordinates: 52.566389°N 13.512222°E
- Owner: DB Netz
- Operator: DB Station&Service
- Platforms: 1 island platform 2 side platforms
- Tracks: 4
- Train operators: DB Regio Nordost; Niederbarnimer Eisenbahn; S-Bahn Berlin

Other information
- Station code: 0544
- DS100 code: BHSH long distance BHH S-Bahn
- Category: 4
- Fare zone: VBB: Berlin B/5656

History
- Opened: 20 December 1984; 41 years ago

Services
Preceding station	DB Regio Nordost	Following station
Berlin-Lichtenberg towards Wünsdorf-Waldstadt	RB 24	Bernau bei Berlin towards Eberswalde Hbf
Berlin-Lichtenberg towards Ludwigsfelde	RB 32	Oranienburg Terminus
Preceding station	Niederbarnimer Eisenbahn	Following station
Berlin-Lichtenberg towards Berlin Ostkreuz	RB 12	Oranienburg towards Templin Stadt
Berlin-Lichtenberg One-way operation	RB 54 Limited service	Oranienburg towards Rheinsberg (Mark)
Preceding station	Berlin S-Bahn	Following station
Gehrenseestraße towards Warschauer Straße	S75	Wartenberg Terminus
Location

Berlin-Hohenschönhausen is a railway station in the Lichtenberg district of Berlin. The station is located on the Berlin outer ring railway.

== Overview ==
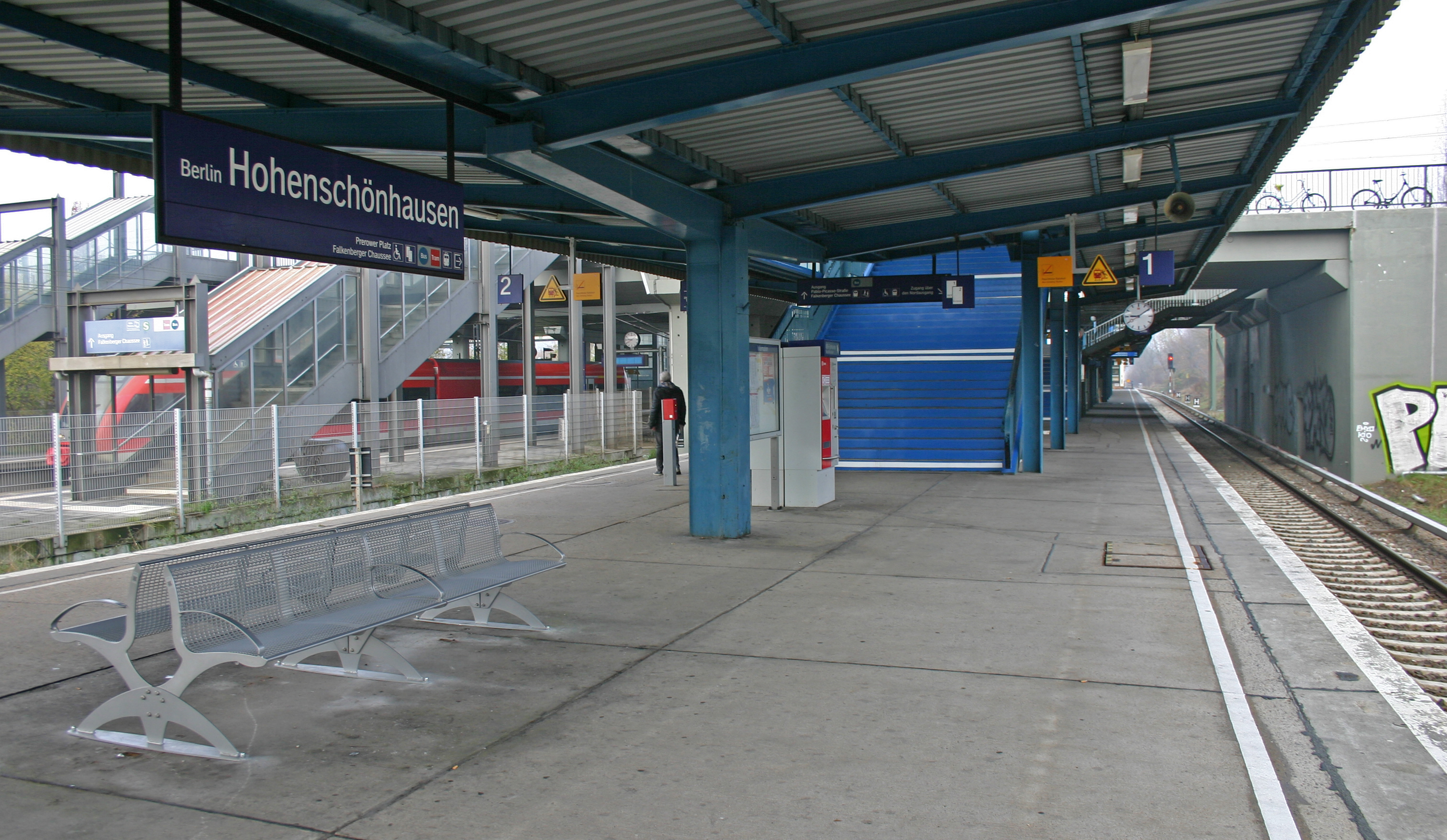
Platform for the S-Bahn service.

The station is located in the center of the Neu-Hohenschönhausen district, at the intersection of the Berlin outer ring with Falkenberger Chaussee. The road crosses the track with three overpasses, of which the northern and southern serves individual traffic. The middle flyover is used by buses and trams.

The S-Bahn station is located on the VzG route 6012, which runs from Berlin Springpfuhl to Berlin-Wartenberg, the S-Bahn station Wartenberg itself is a station part of the S-Bahn station Hohenschönhausen. The station has two continuous main tracks, which are connected via a Weichentrapez between Hohenschönhausen and Wartenberg. The station has a total of five main signals, one entry and exit signal and three intermediate signals. The Hl signals are operated by the electromechanical interlocking Hsh (type E 12/78) at the northern end of the S-Bahn platform. The relay block is used as a route block in the direction of Springpfuhl. The S-Bahn station is equipped with a 103 centimeters high and 163 meters long central platform, there are access to both sides of the Falkenberger Chaussee and the tram and bus stop in the middle. The northern access has a ramp.

The Berlin-Hohenschönhausen branch is composed of the breakpoint on the VzG line 6067 (Abzw Biesdorfer cross north - Abzw Karow east) and a branch off to the south. At the branching point threads the running parallel to the outer ring VzG line 6160 (Berlin-Hohenschönhausen - Abzw Biesdorfer Cross North), at which the station is Berlin Northeast. The block signals of the branch point are remote from the relay interlock Bik (type GS II Sp64b) at Biesdorfer cross off, the track is equipped in the area Hohenschönhausen with automatic block AB70. The regional station is equipped with two side platforms, both are each 76 inches high and about 211 meters long. The southern access is via stairs, the northern via two elevator systems. The western platform in direction of travel Berlin-Lichtenberg also has a ground-level access to Wartenberger Straße.

== History ==
To connect the built in the mid-1980s development area Hohenschönhausen II, the present district Neu- Hohenschönhausen, the German Reichsbahn took on 20 December 1984, the first section of the S-Bahn from Springpfuhl to Hohenschönhausen in operation. The operation was initially only a single track. The day after a year was followed by the extension to Wartenberg and the start of the two-track operation. The Hsh interlocking also went into operation with the extension. The regional train platforms were in operation from April 14, 1986. They should later be replaced by a long-distance and S-Bahn stop in Malchow on the federal highway 2. The Westbahnsteig for trips to Berlin-Lichtenberg therefore only received ground-level access to Wartenberger Straße, while the Ostbahnsteig was connected to the Falkenberger Chaussee. Since the housing program of the GDR after the political change were abandoned, the implementation of the project was omitted. In 1998, the regional train station was completely renovated and renewed; the Westbahnsteig got access to the Falkenberger Chaussee, on the north side two elevator systems for barrier-free access went into operation.

== Train services ==
The station was served by the following services in 2026:

Line	Route	Interval (min)
RB 12	Templin – Löwenberg – Oranienburg – Berlin-Hohenschönhausen – Berlin Ostkreuz	60
RB 24	Eberswalde – Biesenthal – Bernau – Berlin-Hohenschönhausen – Lichtenberg – Berlin Ostkreuz – Berlin-Schöneweide – BER Airport – Blankenfelde – Dahlewitz – Rangsdorf – Dabendorf – Zossen – Wünsdorf-Waldstadt	60
RB 32	Oranienburg – Berlin-Hohenschönhausen – Berlin Ostkreuz – Berlin-Schöneweide – BER Airport – Birkengrund – Ludwigsfelde	60
RB 54	Berlin-Lichtenberg – Berlin-Hohenschönhausen – Oranienburg – Rheinsberg	One train towards Rheinsberg
S75	Berlin-Wartenberg – Berlin-Hohenschönhausen – Berlin-Lichtenberg – Berlin Ostkreuz – Berlin Warschauer Straße	10

== Public transport ==
The station is served by tram lines M4 and M17 and bus services X54, 154, 197, 256, 893 and N56

== See also ==
- Hohenschönhausen
- Neu-Hohenschönhausen
- Alt-Hohenschönhausen
