= Oranienburg station =

Railway station in Oranienburg, Germany

Oranienburg
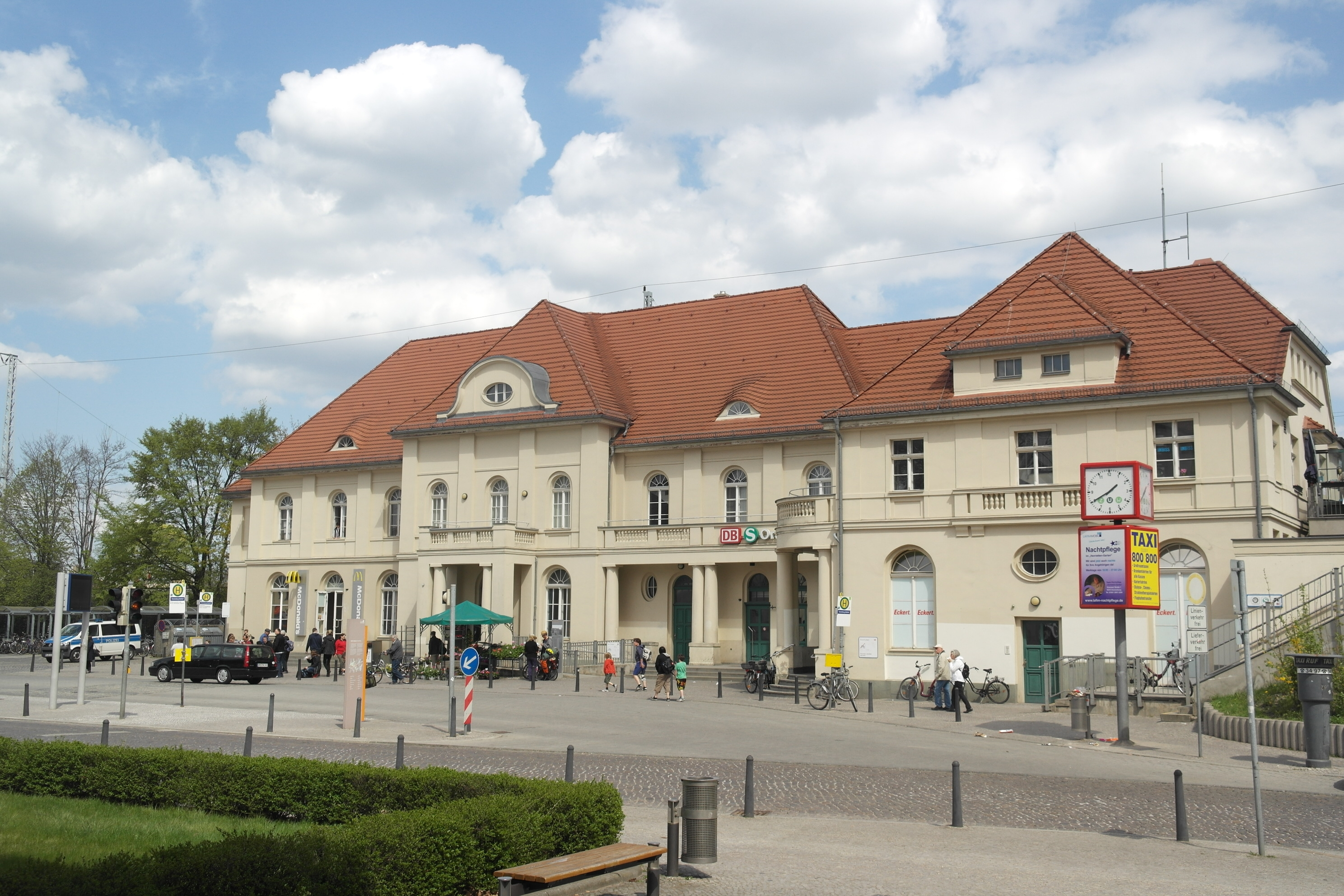
- Oranienburg railway station

General information
- Location: Oranienburg, Brandenburg; Germany
- Coordinates: 52.7536°N 13.2496°E
- Owner: Deutsche Bahn
- Operator: DB Netz; DB Station&Service
- Lines: Northern Railway; Nauen–Oranienburg railway (defunct); Oranienburg–Velten railway (defunct)
- Platforms: 5
- Connections: 800 801 802 803 804 805 812 821 824

Construction
- Accessible: Yes

Other information
- Station code: 4777
- DS100 code: BOR
- Category: 3
- Fare zone: VBB: Berlin C/5053
- Website: www.bahnhof.de

History
- Opened: 10 July 1877; 149 years ago
- Electrified: : 4 October 1925; 100 years ago main line: 15 December 1983; 42 years ago

Key dates
- 1913-1915: current building erected
Services
Preceding station	DB Fernverkehr	Following station
Neustrelitz Hbf One-way operation	ICE 17	Berlin Gesundbrunnen towards Berlin Südkreuz
Neustrelitz Hbf towards Rostock Hbf	IC 17	Berlin Gesundbrunnen towards Chemnitz Hbf or Wien Hbf
Neustrelitz Hbf towards Rostock Hbf	IC 56	Berlin Gesundbrunnen towards Magdeburg Hbf
Preceding station	DB Regio Nordost	Following station
Löwenberg (Mark) towards Rostock Hbf or Stralsund Hbf	RE 5	Berlin-Gesundbrunnen towards Berlin Südkreuz
Terminus	RB 20	Birkenwerder towards Potsdam Griebnitzsee
Terminus	RB 32	Berlin-Hohenschönhausen towards Ludwigsfelde
Preceding station	Niederbarnimer Eisenbahn	Following station
Sachsenhausen (Nordbahn) towards Templin Stadt	RB 12	Berlin-Hohenschönhausen towards Berlin Ostkreuz
Preceding station	Berlin S-Bahn	Following station
Terminus	S1	Lehnitz towards Wannsee
Location

Oranienburg (German: Bahnhof Oranienburg) is a railway station located in Oranienburg, Germany. The station was opened in 1877 is located on the Berlin Northern Railway and the now closed Nauen–Oranienburg railway and Oranienburg–Velten railway. The train services are operated by Deutsche Bahn and Niederbarnimer Eisenbahn.

== History ==
After the construction of the Wall on 13 August 1961, the S-Bahn line was interrupted to Berlin on the border with West Berlin between Hohen Neuendorf and Berlin-Frohnau, thus travelling alone. Later on, the track of the Berlin outer ring between Hohen Neuendorf and the Karower Kreuz was temporarily provided with a busbar and built an additional connecting curve between outer ring and northern railway at Hohen Neuendorf, so that from 19 November 1961 again a direct S-Bahn traffic to East Berlin was possible. After some restrictions in the early years was possible since the mid-1960s again a continuous 20-minute cycle on the S-Bahn. For decades, the S-Bahn trains from Oranienburg via Birkenwerder, Blankenburg, Ostkreuz to Schönefeld Airport; in the evening and weekend traffic partly to Spindlersfeld.

The rapid-transit railway handled the entire local passenger traffic between Oranienburg and Berlin, other passenger trains stopped because of limited capacities in this relation no more. The passenger trains to the north to various destinations on the northern railway and to the branches in Löwenberg (Mark) routes to Templin and Rheinsberg or Neuruppin began in Oranienburg. In addition, there were some trains between Oranienburg and Hennigsdorf on Birkenwerder and until the suspension of passenger traffic on these routes in the 1960s in the direction of Velten and Nauen Kremmen.

With the expansion of the ports in Rostock and Stralsund, the growing population in the north of the GDR and the increasing tourism, the importance of the Northern Railway and also the Oranienburg station for the long-distance and freight traffic grew. All express trains between Berlin and Rostock or Stralsund via Neubrandenburg stopped at the station; since November 1976 also a Städteexpress train pair. By the outer ring of Berlin, the bypass railway and the 1950/1951 built links to Basdorf and Velten had lost their meaning. The passenger traffic from Oranienburg via Kremmen to Nauen was discontinued in 1967, the one after Velten in 1969. While the latter line was shut down and dismantled a few years later, the lines to Nauen and Basdorf, which had never had scheduled passenger services, remained in service for freight, as diversion and military strategic reserve until the mid-1990s.

The conversion of the railway systems between Oranienburg and Lehnitz began in 1977. On this section, both the S-Bahn and the mainline ran only a single track. In several stages until 1990, first the S-Bahn (with the exception of a 400 -meter-long section at the station entrance of Oranienburg), then expanded the long-haul double-track. During conversion, the junction of the Nauen bypass was redesigned. While she used to run over the Nordbahn tracks on an overpass and was only connected to her at the Oranienburg station, she subsequently joined the Nordbahn at the same level. The rails between the intersection and the station were removed.

Since 1982, the station was gradually rebuilt. The former platform of the bypass railway became a direction platform for trains to the north. In October 1987, a modern track diagram was inaugurated. On 15 December 1983 the electrical operation between Birkenwerder and Löwenberg (Mark), and thus also in Oranienburg station, was added.

In May 1992, the S-Bahn line reopened between Hohen Neuendorf and Frohnau and provides the direct connection from Oranienburg towards the Berlin city center. Since then S1 has operated between Oranienburg and Berlin Wannsee. The route to Basdorf has been out of service since 1995 (with the exception of short-term railcar rides in 1998). Also in the mid-1990s, the bypass between Oranienburg and Nauen was shut down. In 2001, this station was extensively renovated.

== Train services ==
The station was served by the following services in 2026:

Line	Route	Interval
IC 17	Warnemünde – Rostock – Neustrelitz – Oranienburg – Berlin Gesundbrunnen – Berlin Hbf – Berlin Südkreuz – BER Airport – Elsterwerda – Dresden (– Chemnitz)	Every 2 hours
IC 56	Magdeburg – Berlin Hbf – Oranienburg – Rostock	One train pair
RE 5	Rostock / Stralsund - Neustrelitz – Oranienburg – Berlin – Berlin Südkreuz	60 (Berlin-Südkreuz–Neustrelitz); 120 (to/from Rostock/Stralsund)
RB 12	Templin – Löwenberg – Oranienburg – Berlin	60
RB 20	Potsdam – Golm – Hennigsdorf – Oranienburg	60 (Mon–Fri)
RB 32	Oranienburg – Berlin-Lichtenberg – Berlin Ostkreuz – Berlin-Schöneweide – BER Airport – Birkengrund – Ludwigsfelde	60
S1	Oranienburg – Wittenau – Gesundbrunnen – Friedrichstraße – Potsdamer Platz – Schöneberg – Steglitz – Wannsee	20
