= Sachsenhausen (Nordbahn) station =

Railway station in Germany

Sachsenhausen (Nordbahn)
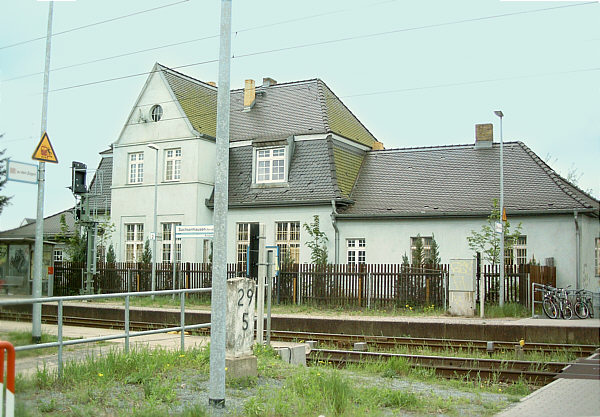
- 2006

General information
- Location: An der Bahn; 16515 Sachsenhausen; Brandenburg; Germany
- Coordinates: 52°46′20″N 13°15′06″E
- Owner: DB Netz
- Operator: DB Station&Service
- Line: Berlin Northern Railway
- Platforms: 2 side platforms
- Tracks: 2
- Train operators: Niederbarnimer Eisenbahn

Other information
- Station code: 5466
- DS100 code: BSAH
- IBNR: 8012831
- Category: 6
- Fare zone: VBB: Berlin C/5053
- Website: www.bahnhof.de

History
- Opened: 1 August 1905; 121 years ago

Services
Preceding station	Niederbarnimer Eisenbahn	Following station
Oranienburg towards Berlin Ostkreuz	RB 12	Nassenheide towards Templin Stadt
Location
- Location within Brandenburg Location within Germany Location within Europe

Sachsenhausen (Nordbahn) station is a railway station in the Sachsenhausen district in the town of Oranienburg, located in the Oberhavel district in Brandenburg, Germany.
