= Nassenheide station =

Railway station in Germany

Nassenheide

General information
- Location: Am Bahnhof 10; 16775 Nassenheide; Brandenburg; Germany
- Coordinates: 52°49′04″N 13°14′22″E
- Owner: DB Netz
- Operator: DB Station&Service
- Line: Berlin Northern Railway
- Platforms: 2 side platforms
- Tracks: 4
- Train operators: Niederbarnimer Eisenbahn

Other information
- Station code: 2395
- DS100 code: WGRG
- IBNR: 8011776
- Category: 6
- Fare zone: VBB: 4953
- Website: www.bahnhof.de

History
- Opened: 15 May 1879; 147 years ago

Services
| Preceding station | Niederbarnimer Eisenbahn | Following station |
|---|---|---|
| Sachsenhausen (Nordbahn) towards Berlin Ostkreuz | RB 12 | Grüneberg towards Templin Stadt |
Location
- Location within Brandenburg Location within Germany Location within Europe

Nassenheide station is a railway station in the Nassenheide district in the municipality of Löwenberger Land, located in the Oberhavel district in Brandenburg, Germany.
