= Templin station =

Railway station in Templin, Germany

Templin
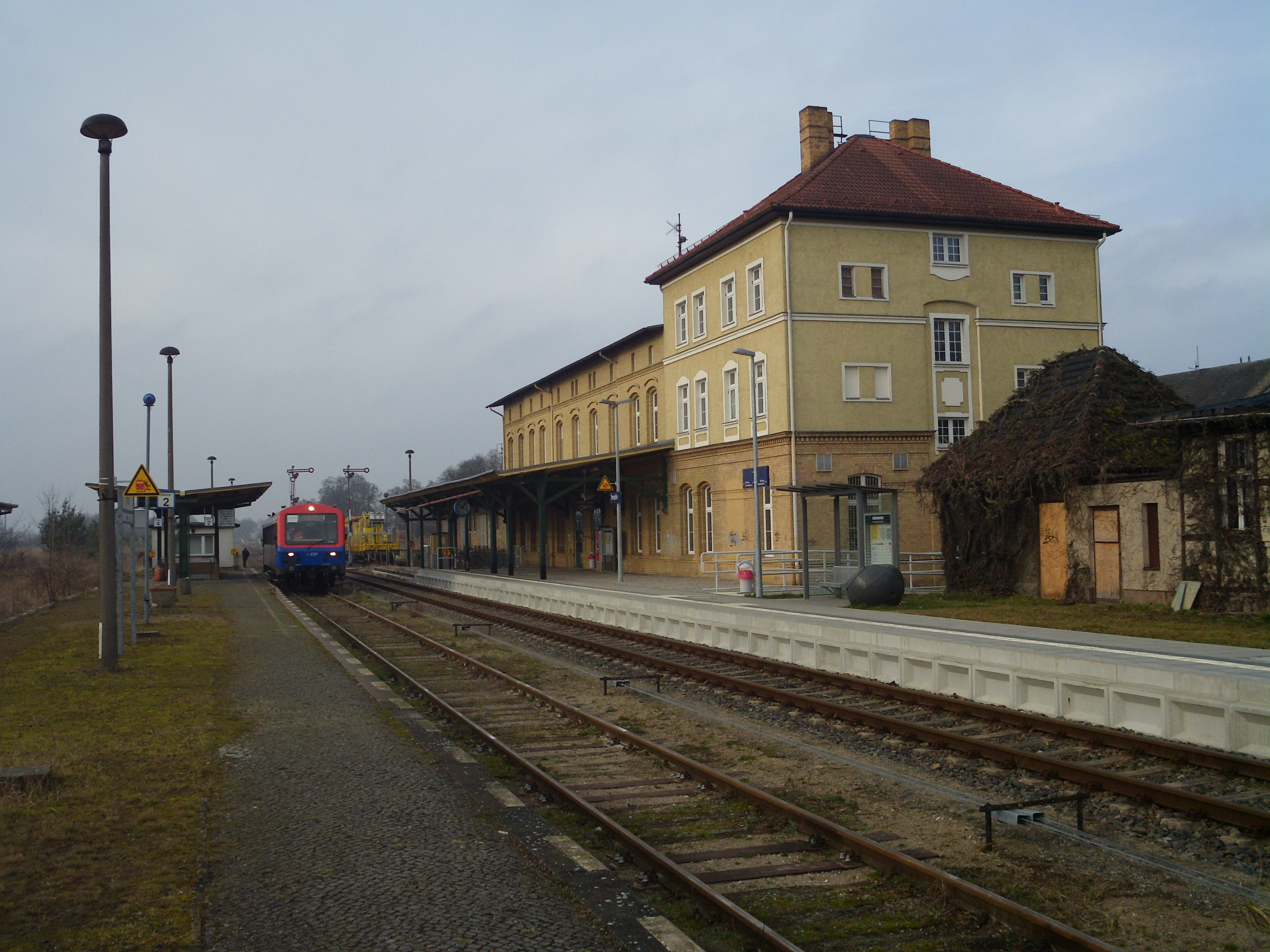
- 2014

General information
- Location: Zehdenicker Straße 1; 17268 Templin; Brandenburg; Germany
- Coordinates: 53.1122°N 13.4911°E
- Owner: DB Netz
- Operator: DB Station&Service
- Lines: Löwenberg–Prenzlau railway (KBS 209.12); Britz–Fürstenberg railway (KBS 209.60)
- Platforms: 1 side platform
- Tracks: 2
- Train operators: Niederbarnimer Eisenbahn

Other information
- Station code: 6167
- DS100 code: WT
- IBNR: 8010347
- Category: 7
- Fare zone: VBB: 4157
- Website: www.bahnhof.de

History
- Opened: 1 May 1888; 138 years ago

Services
Preceding station	Niederbarnimer Eisenbahn	Following station
Hammelspring towards Berlin Ostkreuz	RB 12	Templin Stadt Terminus
Location

Templin station is a railway station in the municipality of Templin, located in the Uckermark district in Brandenburg, Germany.
