= Löwenberg (Mark) station =

Railway station in Löwenberger Land, Germany

Löwenberg (Mark)
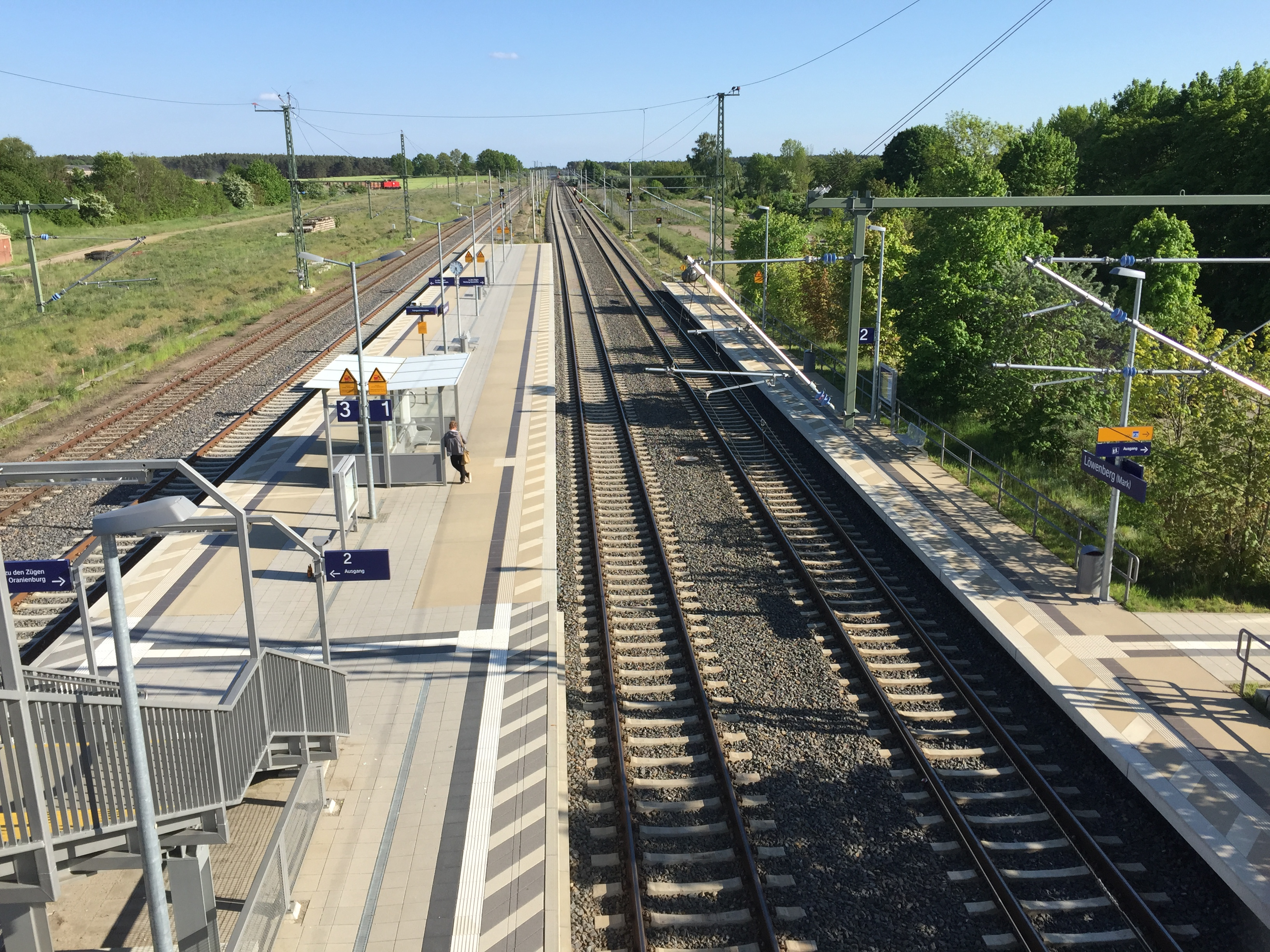
- 2015

General information
- Location: Löwenberger Land, Brandenburg; Germany
- Coordinates: 52.896647222222°N 13.190072222222°E
- Owner: Deutsche Bahn
- Operator: DB Station&Service
- Lines: Berlin Northern Railway; Löwenberg–Rheinsberg railway Löwenberg–Prenzlau railway
- Platforms: 3
- Train operators: DB Regio Nordost; Niederbarnimer Eisenbahn

Other information
- Station code: 3796
- DS100 code: WLO
- IBNR: 8010214
- Category: 6
- Fare zone: VBB: 4652
- Website: www.bahnhof.de

History
- Opened: 10 July 1877; 149 years ago

Services
| Preceding station | DB Regio Nordost | Following station |
|---|---|---|
| Gransee towards Rostock Hbf or Stralsund Hbf | RE 5 | Oranienburg towards Berlin Südkreuz |
| Preceding station | Niederbarnimer Eisenbahn | Following station |
| Grüneberg towards Berlin Ostkreuz | RB 12 | Bergsdorf towards Templin Stadt |
| Herzberg (Mark) towards Rheinsberg (Mark) | RB 54 | Terminus |
Location

Löwenberg (Mark) (German: Bahnhof Löwenberg (Mark)) is a railway station located in Löwenberger Land, Germany. The station was opened in 1847 is located on the Berlin Northern Railway, Löwenberg-Lindow-Rheinsberger railway and Löwenberg–Prenzlau railway. The train services are operated by Deutsche Bahn and Niederbarnimer Eisenbahn.

== Train services ==
The following services currently call at the station:

- Regional services RE 5 Rostock / Stralsund - Neustrelitz - Berlin - Wünsdorf-Waldstadt - Elsterwerda
- Local services RB 12 Templin – Löwenberg – Oranienburg – Berlin
- Local services RB 54 Rheinsberg – Löwenberg (– Oranienburg – Berlin)
