= Rheinsberg (Mark) station =

Railway station in Rheinsberg, Germany

Rheinsberg (Mark) Rheinsberg
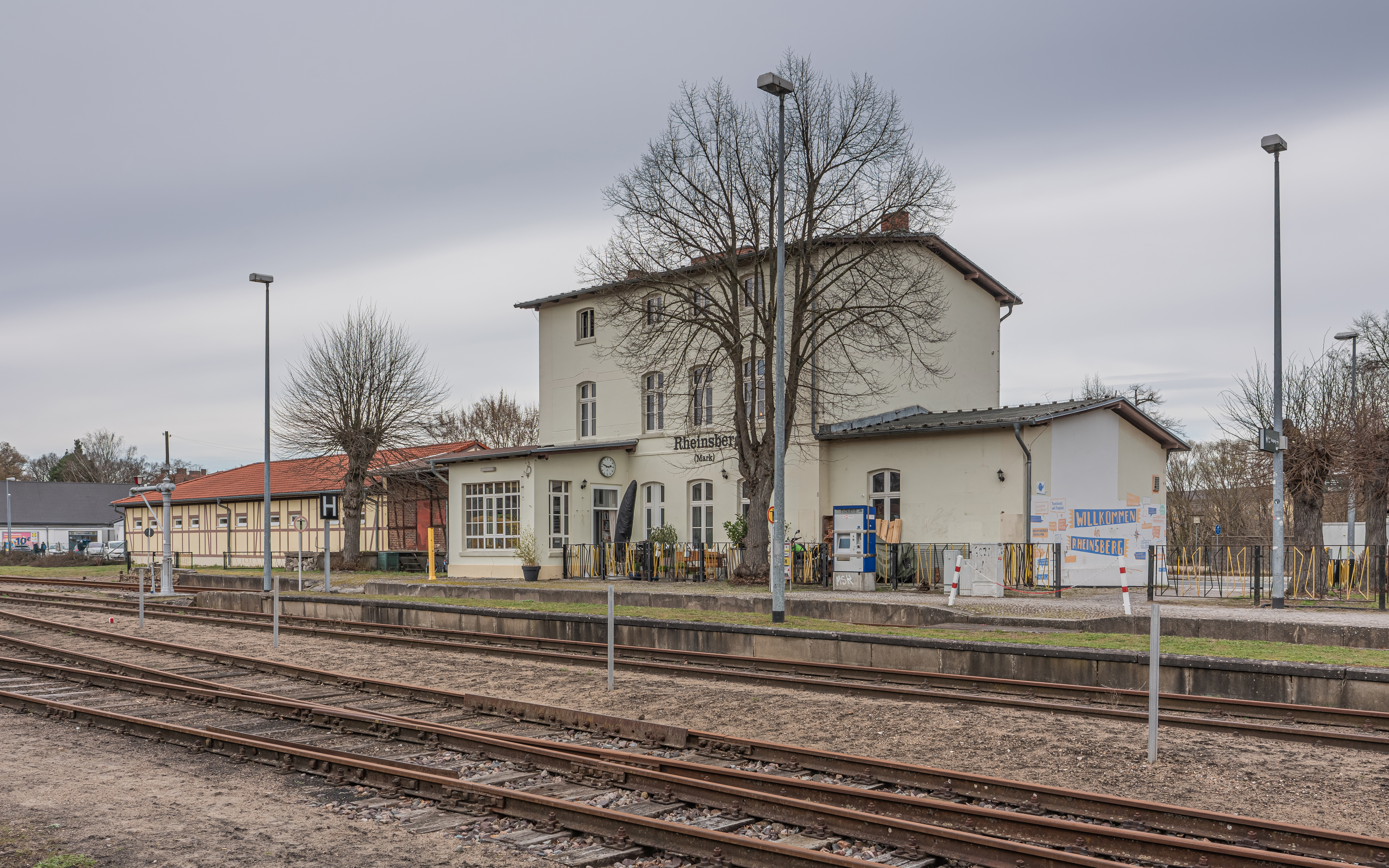

General information
- Location: Damaschkeweg; 16831 Rheinsberg (Mark); Brandenburg; Germany
- Coordinates: 53.0931°N 12.9001°E
- Owner: RegioInfra
- Operator: RegioInfra
- Platforms: 1 side platform
- Tracks: 1
- Train operators: Niederbarnimer Eisenbahn

Other information
- Station code: ?
- DS100 code: WRH
- IBNR: 8012760
- Category: 6
- Fare zone: VBB: 4248

History
- Opened: 1899; 127 years ago

Services
Preceding station	Niederbarnimer Eisenbahn	Following station
Terminus	RB 54	Lindow (Mark) towards Löwenberg (Mark)
Location
- Location within Brandenburg Location within Germany Location within Europe

Rheinsberg (Mark) station is a railway station in the town of Rheinsberg (Mark), located in the Ostprignitz-Ruppin district in Brandenburg, Germany.
