= Ludwigsfelde station =

Railway station in Ludwigsfelde, Germany

Ludwigsfelde
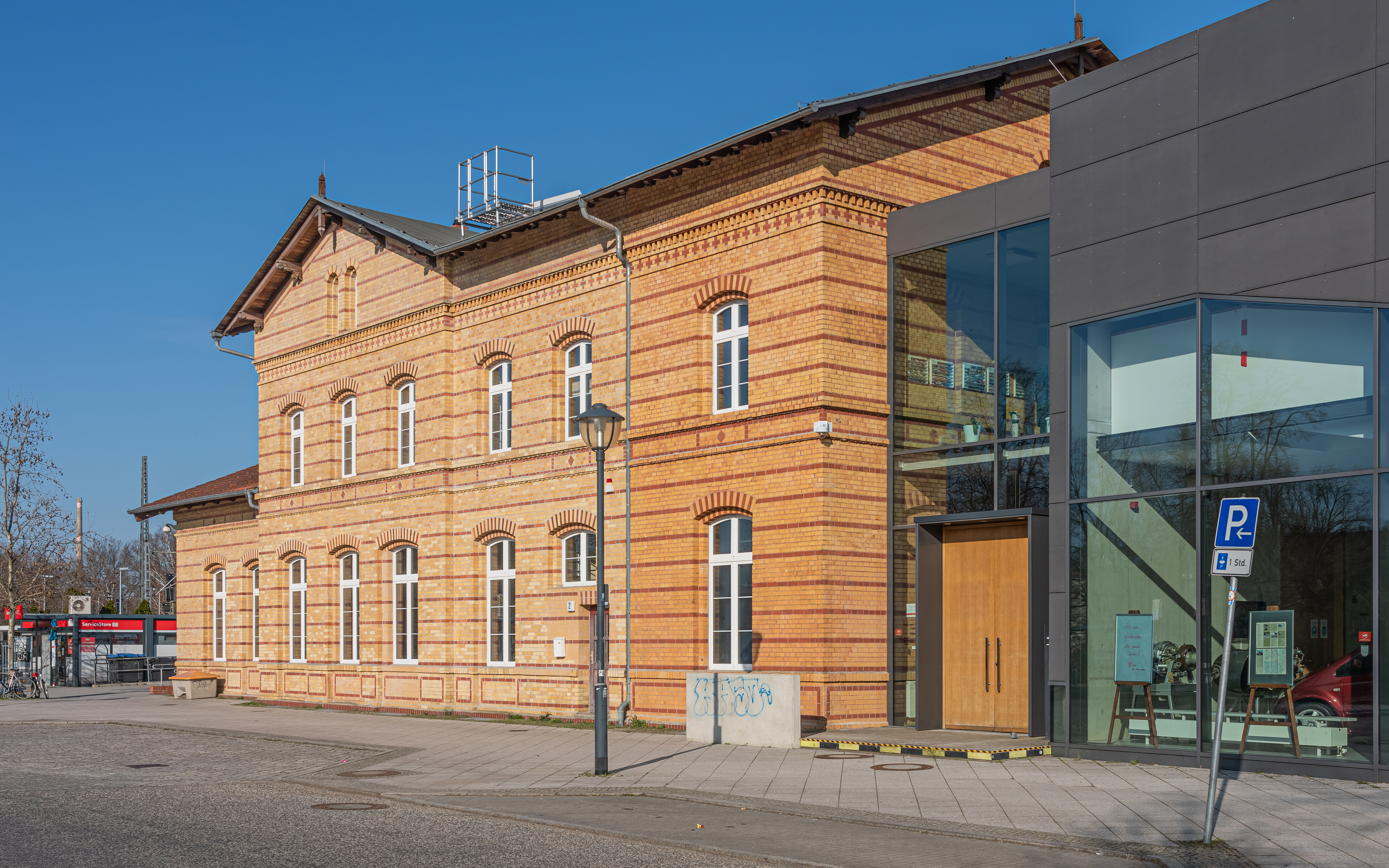
- Ludwigsfelde railway station

General information
- Location: Am Bahnhof 2, Ludwigsfelde, Brandenburg; Germany
- Coordinates: 52°17′55″N 13°16′02″E
- Lines: Anhalt Railway; Anhalt Suburban Line (dismantled); connecting curve to the Berlin outer ring
- Platforms: 4
- Tracks: 4

Construction
- Accessible: Yes

Other information
- Station code: 3835
- DS100 code: BLF
- IBNR: 8010215
- Category: 4
- Fare zone: VBB: Berlin C/6053
- Website: www.bahnhof.de

History
- Opened: 1 July 1841

Services
Preceding station	DB Regio Nordost	Following station
Berlin-Lichterfelde Ost towards Stralsund Hbf or Schwedt	RE 3	Thyrow towards Jüterbog or Lutherstadt Wittenberg Hbf
Birkengrund towards Rathenow or Stendal Hbf	RE 4	Luckenwalde towards Jüterbog or Falkenberg (Elster)
Birkengrund towards Oranienburg	RB 32	Terminus
Location

Ludwigsfelde station is located in the town of Ludwigsfelde on the Anhalt Railway south of Berlin and is one of the oldest railway stations in the German state Brandenburg. The station building, which was built around 1880, is a listed building and is the second oldest building in the town. It now houses a museum. Several houses in the railway station area are also listed buildings.

== Location ==
The station is located on the railway line between Berlin and Halle (called the Anhalter Bahn—Anhalt Railway) south of Berlin. It ran away from major towns. When the station was opened, the only settlements near it were two small localities called Damsdorf and Ludwigsfelde, which were a few hundred metres to the east. The latter settlement gave its name to the station. The present town of Ludwigsfelde was established in the 20th century, and its centre is located to the west of the station.

The town of Ludwigsfelde also includes Ludwigsfelde-Struveshof station, which is located on the Berlin Outer Ring to the northwest of the centre of the town. It was opened in 2012 and replaced Genshagener Heide station, which was isolated on the edge of an industrial area at the extreme north of the urban area. Another station, Birkengrund is north of Ludwigsfelde station on the Anhalt line within the town limits. Earlier this station was called Birkengrund Süd (south) to distinguish it from Birkengrund Nord (north), which was closed in the 1990s.

== History ==
At the opening of Anhalt Railway in 1841 a water station for the supply of steam locomotives was built in Ludwigsfelde as well as in neighbouring Großbeeren. With the commencement of freight operations on the line in December 1841, a freight train also carrying passengers stopped at Großbeeren and Ludwigsfelde stations. It could be used to travel to Berlin in the morning and to return in the afternoon. The travel time between Ludwigsfelde and Berlin was about three quarters of an hour.

At first, patronage in Ludwigsfelde was not strong, unlike in Großbeeren, due to the small population nearby, so that the railway company was considering closing the station in 1846. This was prevented by protests by the regional and district councils. In the following period, passenger numbers increased, so that Großbeeren and Ludwigsfelde were stops for all scheduled passenger trains from 1849.

In the following years, the number of passengers increased significantly. 5,360 passengers were counted at the station in 1852 and there were 31,767 in 1873. The passenger numbers were approximately equivalent to those in neighbouring Großbeeren, although the village of Ludwigsfelde had only 122 inhabitants in 1892, while Großbeeren still had more than ten times as many people. However, a number of villages in the area were easily accessible from Ludwigsfelde station due to its excellent road connections. Freight traffic also developed to a similar extent: in 1873, 42.430 Zentner (cwt, the Prussian Zentner or hundredweight equalled 51.45 kg) of goods were shipped and 68,175 cwt were received in Ludwigsfelde.

Around 1880, a new entrance building was built at the station, which still exists today. This was about 100 metres north of the old station, which was right on the level crossing with the street that is now called Potsdamer Straße. In the area vacated by the relocation of the station, several residential buildings for railway officials were built.

=== Development during the Third Reich ===
After the station had only local significance for several decades, traffic levels increased significantly in the 1930s. With the opening of the Daimler-Benz car factory in Genshagen, Ludwigsfelde became an important industrial centre and the number of inhabitants multiplied. Genshagener Heide station was first built on the Michendorf–Großbeeren railway for factory workers, but later a new Birkengrund station was built on the Anhalt Railway. During working hours, the trains were stored at Ludwigsfelde station. A staff station for the car factory was built in the Birkengrund area north of Ludwigsfelde station.

It was originally planned to build a line for local trains separate from the tracks long-distance passengers trains between Berlin and Trebbin, but this was only completed to Ludwigsfelde by 1943. A separate terminal platform was built on the western side of the railway tracks for services from Berlin that terminated in Ludwigsfelde. Because of the war, the suburban line was electrified only as far as Lichterfelde Süd, so commuter trains to Ludwigsfelde had to be switched from the Berlin S-Bahn and then be hauled by steam locomotives. The S-Bahn fare zone was extended to Ludwigsfelde.

=== After the Second World War ===
The engine plant was closed after the end of World War II and the car factory was dismantled to provide war reparations to the Soviet Union. The VEB Industriewerke Ludwigsfelde was established on the site in 1952 and it developed into a car factory. Ludwigsfelde thus remained an important industrial centre. Due to the growing impact of the division of Germany and division of Berlin, through traffic on the Anhalt Railway to Berlin was blockaded in 1952, as the route ran through West Berlin. Until the building of the Berlin Wall in 1961, only S-Bahn services remained in operation to Teltow station, where passengers could change to continue to Ludwigsfelde. Other passenger operations as well as freight traffic used a connection to the Berlin Outer Ring, which was opened in the early 1950s, that had been built to the north of Ludwigsfelde.

In the late 1970s, work began on the electrification of the line. The contact wire from the south to Ludwigsfelde was taken into operation on 27 September 1981. This meant that the locomotives on most trains were changed there. The stop to enable the exchange of locomotives was also shown as a scheduled stop for express trains. As of 23 May 1982, electrically hauled freight trains could continue towards Seddin. The completion of the following sections could not be carried out as planned due to a lack of transformer capacity, but with the commissioning of the catenary to Berlin-Schöneweide on 2 May and to Berlin-Lichtenberg on 30 September 1984, the locomotive change in Ludwigsfelde was largely abandoned.

=== Passenger services ===
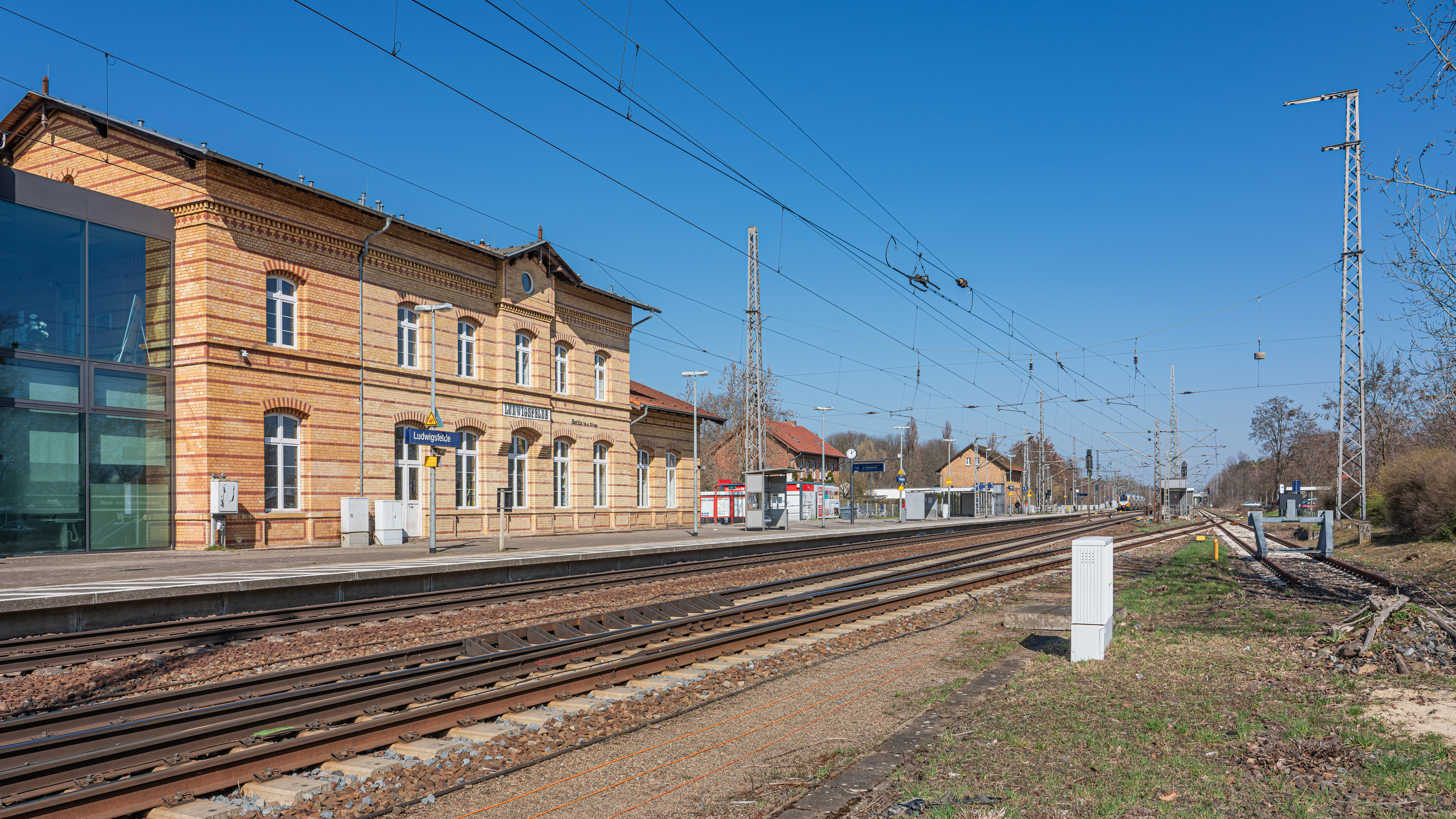
Platforms and tracks, view to the north

Ludwigsfelde was a stop for passenger trains from Berlin to Jüterbog and beyond during nearly all decades. Express and semi-fast trains did not stop at the station before 1945. From 1943 to 1945 there was dense suburban traffic between Ludwigsfelde and Lichterfelde Süd. The trains operated on an approximately equal-interval timetable during off-peak times every hour or every 40 minutes and at peak times every 20, sometimes every 10, minutes. Passenger trains from Berlin to Jüterbog and further south that did not stop in Teltow and Großbeeren during the existence of the separate suburban line stopped in Ludwigsfelde.

After the Second World War, the trains towards Berlin were gradually rerouted over the Berlin Outer Ring. Some trains took the new route over the south-eastern section of the Outer Ring, some remained on the old route, but all these trains ended in Teltow station from 1952, where it was possible to change to S-Bahn trains until the construction of the Berlin Wall in 1961. While a relatively dense rail service still continued to run to Teltow in the first years after the construction of the wall, the number of trains was reduced over the next seven to eight years on weekdays and on weekends there were even a few less. Approximately the same number of trains connected Ludwigsfelde with Schönefeld airport, some also continued to Berlin-Schöneweide or other Berlin stations. Most of the traffic between Ludwigsfelde and East Berlin used Sputnik trains running on the Outer Ring from Genshagener Heide station, which was connected by dense bus connections to the main residential areas of the town. On occasion, individual express trains stopped at Ludwigsfelde in the 1970s and 1980s, such as an express from Aue (Sachs) to Berlin.

After 1990, a more integrated timetable was established. Hourly services ran from the mid-1990s from Jüterbog via Berlin-Schönefeld to Berlin-Lichtenberg and further north. Railcars also ran every hour between Ludwigsfelde and Teltow. At times in the 1990s through trains ran from Ludwigsfelde to Potsdam Pirschheide station, but they were discontinued after a few years due to lack of demand.

In 1998, the connection to Teltow was replaced by buses for several years during work to upgrade the Anhalt line. After the completion of the work on the line and the completion of the North–South mainline in Berlin in 2006, through trains ran again on the direct route to the city centre. The regional services towards Berlin-Schönefeld Airport station were abandoned with the exception of a train on weekend nights.

The station was served by the following services in 2026:

Line	Route	
RE 3	Lutherstadt Wittenberg – Jüterbog – Ludwigsfelde – Berlin Potsdamer Platz – Eberswalde – Angermünde –	Schwedt (Oder)
RE 3	Lutherstadt Wittenberg – Jüterbog – Ludwigsfelde – Berlin Potsdamer Platz – Eberswalde – Angermünde –	Prenzlau – Greifswald – Stralsund
RE 4	(Falkenberg (Elster) –) Jüterbog – Ludwigsfelde – Berlin Potsdamer Platz – Berlin – Berlin-Spandau – Dallgow-Döberitz – Wustermark – Rathenow (– Stendal)	
RB 32	Oranienburg – Berlin-Hohenschönhausen – Berlin-Lichtenberg – Berlin Ostkreuz – Berlin-Schöneweide – BER Airport – Birkengrund – Ludwigsfelde	
As of 14 December 2025

== Infrastructure ==
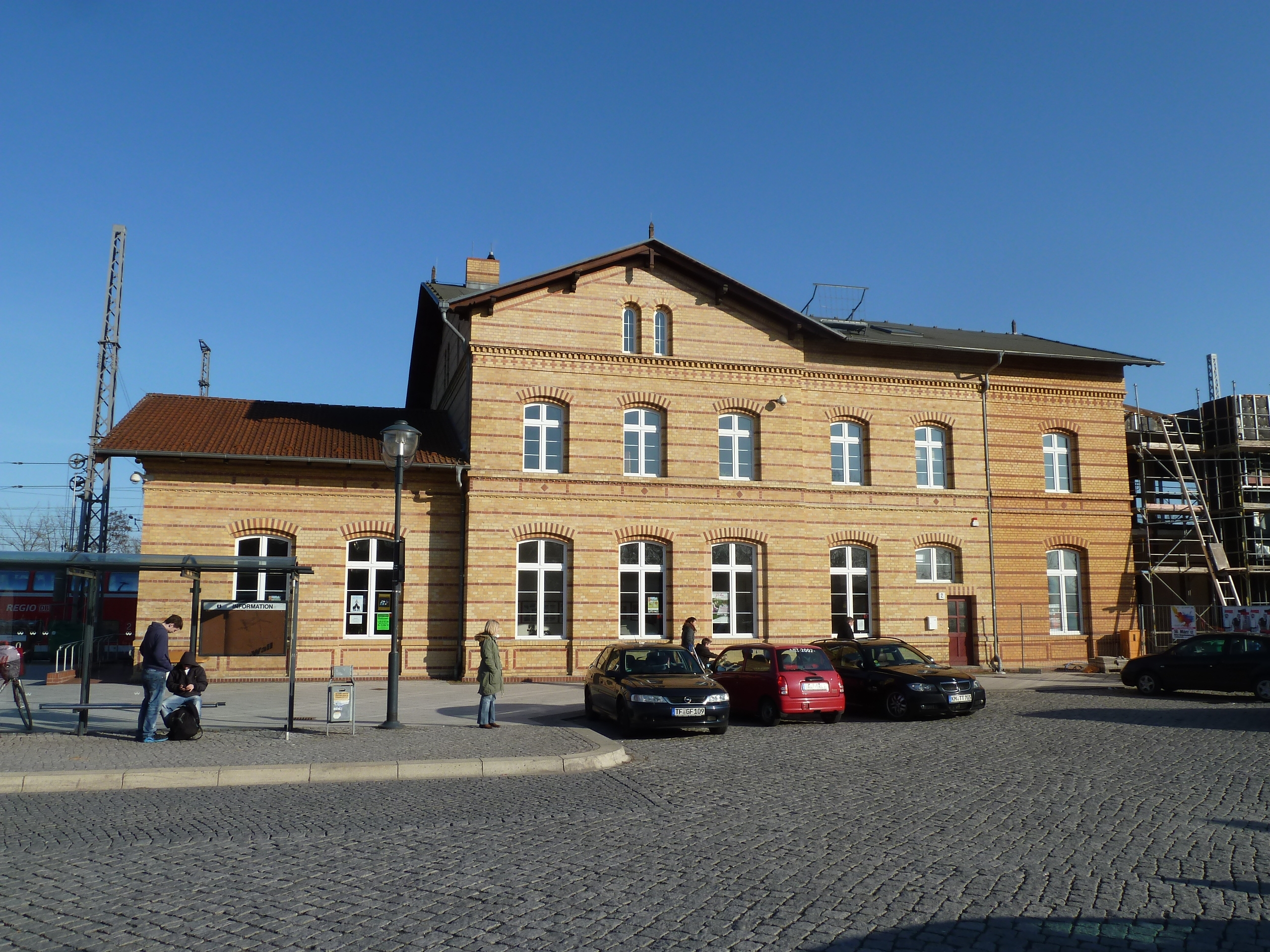
Entrance building in 2012, to the right an exhibition building is under construction

The listed station building, which is located on the western side of the railway tracks, dates from 1886. It is a two-story building of yellow brick with a pitched roof. It was developed on an axis to the south. The building is no longer used for railway purposes. It was renovated and now houses the town museum and Ludwigsfelde technical centre. After 2010 it was supplemented by an annex on its south side.

=== Platforms and tracks ===
Until the 1930s, there was one side platform next to the station building for the line towards Halle and a small island platform for trains heading to Berlin, which could only be reached by passengers by crossing the track. Behind the passenger facilities there was a freight yard. After 1939, the station has had a side platform on the passing tracks for freight trains, which could be reached by a footbridge. After that the island platform was out of service.

In 1943 a suburban railway station was opened on a separate bay platform to the north of the entrance building; on the northeast side of the station tracks there were sidings. After 1945 the terminal tracks were only used for storing carriages.

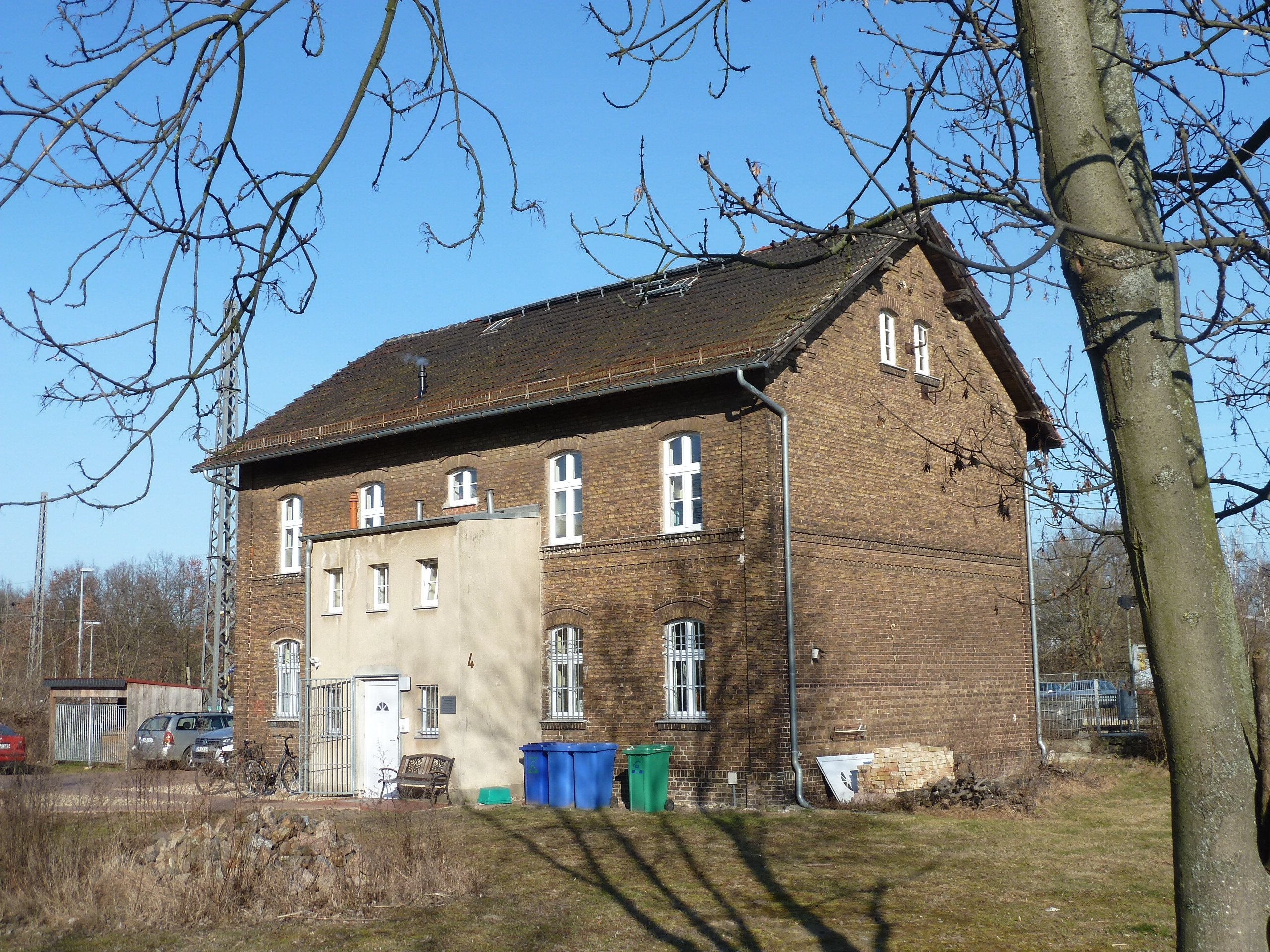
Listed railway workers' residence north of the entrance building

The wooden pedestrian bridge was replaced by a steel bridge around 1980 as part of the electrification of the line. It led not only to the island platform but continued to the freight facilities on the east side of the station area.

The freight tracks to the east of the station have mostly been removed.

After 2000, the footbridge was removed and the island platform has since been reached by a tunnel. Today, the platform next to the entrance building is used for trains heading south and the island platform with its two platform edges is used for trains heading north and for overtaking movements. North of the station building there is still a platform on the track used for overtaking movements, which is used mostly for trains beginning or ending in Ludwigsfelde and running to and from Berlin. This is connected to the main track to the south of the platform next to the station building.

By 1980, the signalling systems had been upgraded on the Berlin–Halle line in preparation for the electrification of the line. Ludwigsfelde station received a new interlocking of the GS II sp64 class, with an existing signalbox being used as the operations room. Automatic block signalling was installed on the line towards Thyrow. During upgrading the line to 200 km/h, the relay interlocking was taken out of service in 2000 after just twenty years of operation and replaced by an electronic interlocking of the Simis C class.

=== Official residences ===
Three official residences and an associated stable in the station area are heritage-listed. These are three two-storey brick buildings that date back to 1886.
