= Basdorf =

- Ortsteil of Wandlitz
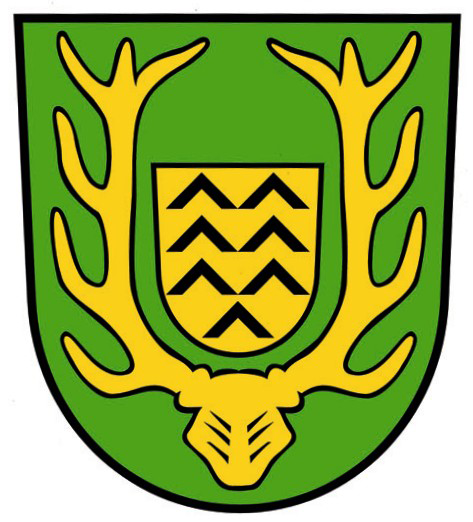
- Coat of arms
- Interactive map of Basdorf
- Location within Germany Location within Brandenburg
- Coordinates: 52°43′3″N 13°26′7.44″E
- Country: Germany
- State: Brandenburg
- District: Barnim
- Municipality: Wandlitz

Area
  - Total: 13.35 km^{2} (5.15 sq mi)
- Elevation: 58–69 m (190–226 ft)

Population (2010-12-31)
  - Total: 5,274
  - Density: 395.1/km^{2} (1,023/sq mi)
- Time zone: UTC+01:00 (CET)
  - Summer (DST): UTC+02:00 (CEST)
- Postal codes: 16348
- Dialling codes: 033397
- Vehicle registration: BAR

Basdorf (German pronunciation: [ˈbaːsdɔʁf]) is a village 20 minutes by car from Berlin, in the German federal state of Brandenburg. Since 2003, Basdorf is a district of the municipality of Wandlitz.

== History ==
From 1815 to 1947, Basdorf was part of the Prussian Province of Brandenburg, from 1947 to 1952 of the State of Brandenburg, from 1952 to 1990 of the East German Bezirk Frankfurt and since 1990 again of Brandenburg.

== Transportation ==
Basdorf railway station is served by the Heidekrautbahn operated by the Niederbarnim Railway (NEB).
