= Siemens Mireo =

Family of electric multi-unit railcars

Siemens Mireo family
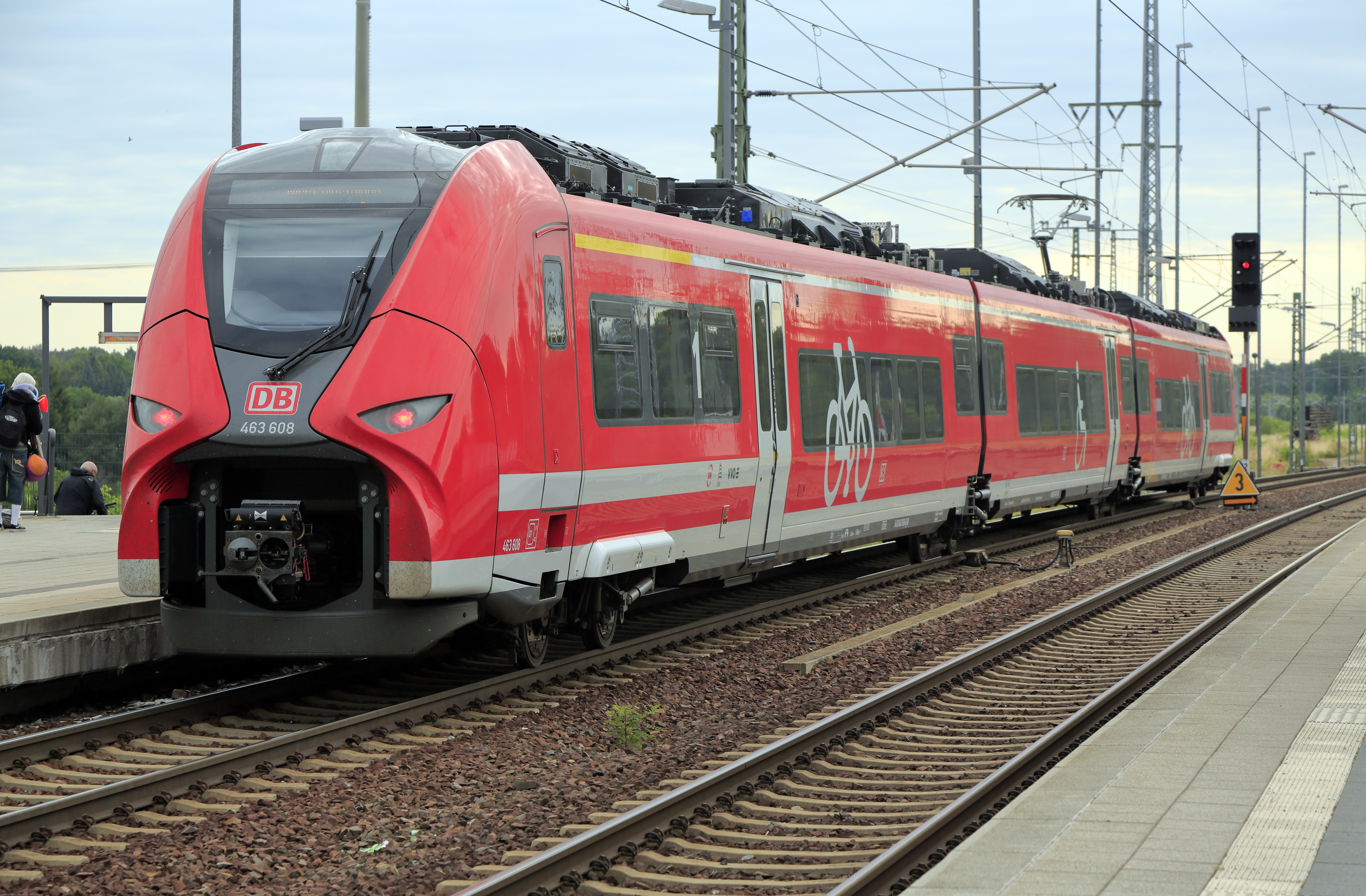
- Mireo of DB Regio operating for the VBB at Falkenberg/Elster in June 2023
- Stock type: Electric Multiple Unit (EMU)
- Manufacturer: Siemens Mobility
- Built at: Waggonfabrik Uerdingen, Krefeld, NRW, Germany
- Number built: 93 (two-car sets); 189 (three-car sets); 49 (four-car sets)
- Predecessor: Desiro ML

Specifications
- Height: 4.208 m (13 ft 9.7 in)
- Wheel diameter: New: 880 mm (35 in); Worn: 810 mm (32 in)
- Wheelbase: Motor bogie: 2,300 mm (7 ft 7 in); Jacobs bogie: 2,600 mm (8 ft 6 in)
- Weight: 112 t (110 long tons; 123 short tons) (three-car sets)
- Axle load: 20 t (20 long tons; 22 short tons)
- Traction system: Siemens IGBT-VVVF
- Power output: 2,600 kW (3,500 hp)
- Tractive effort: 300 kN (67,000 lb_{f})
- Acceleration: around 1.2 m/s (3.9 ft/s)
- Electric system: 15 kV 16.7 Hz AC from overhead catenary
- Current collection: Pantograph (electric)
- Bogies: Siemens SF7500

Siemens Mireo is a family of electric multiple units (EMU) designed by Siemens Mobility. It is designed to be a successor to the "Desiro ML (MainLine)" variant of the company's Desiro EMUs.

Siemens introduced the first Mireo railcars at the 2016 InnoTrans trade fair. The first units were ordered in February 2017 by DB Regio, which ordered 24 three-car trainsets with a passenger capacity of 220 for service on its routes in the Rhine valley in southwestern Germany. DB Regio ordered a further 57 three-car high-density sets for S-Bahn service. Production of Mireo trainsets began in 2018, with the first completed set unveiled in early December. Following testing, Mireo trains are expected to enter revenue service in June 2020.

== Overview ==
Siemens SF7500 Jacobs bogie on the Mireo

The railcars have an articulated design and aluminum carbodies, with 26 meters (85 ft) cab cars on each end of a trainset and 19 meters (62 ft) passenger cars between them, with trainsets between two and seven cars long. The use of aluminum, combined with new control systems, is intended to reduce energy use by up to 25% compared to previous Siemens EMUs. The railcars can reach a top speed of up to 160 km/h (100 mph).

== Variants ==
=== Mireo (Baseline) ===
Mireo (Baseline)
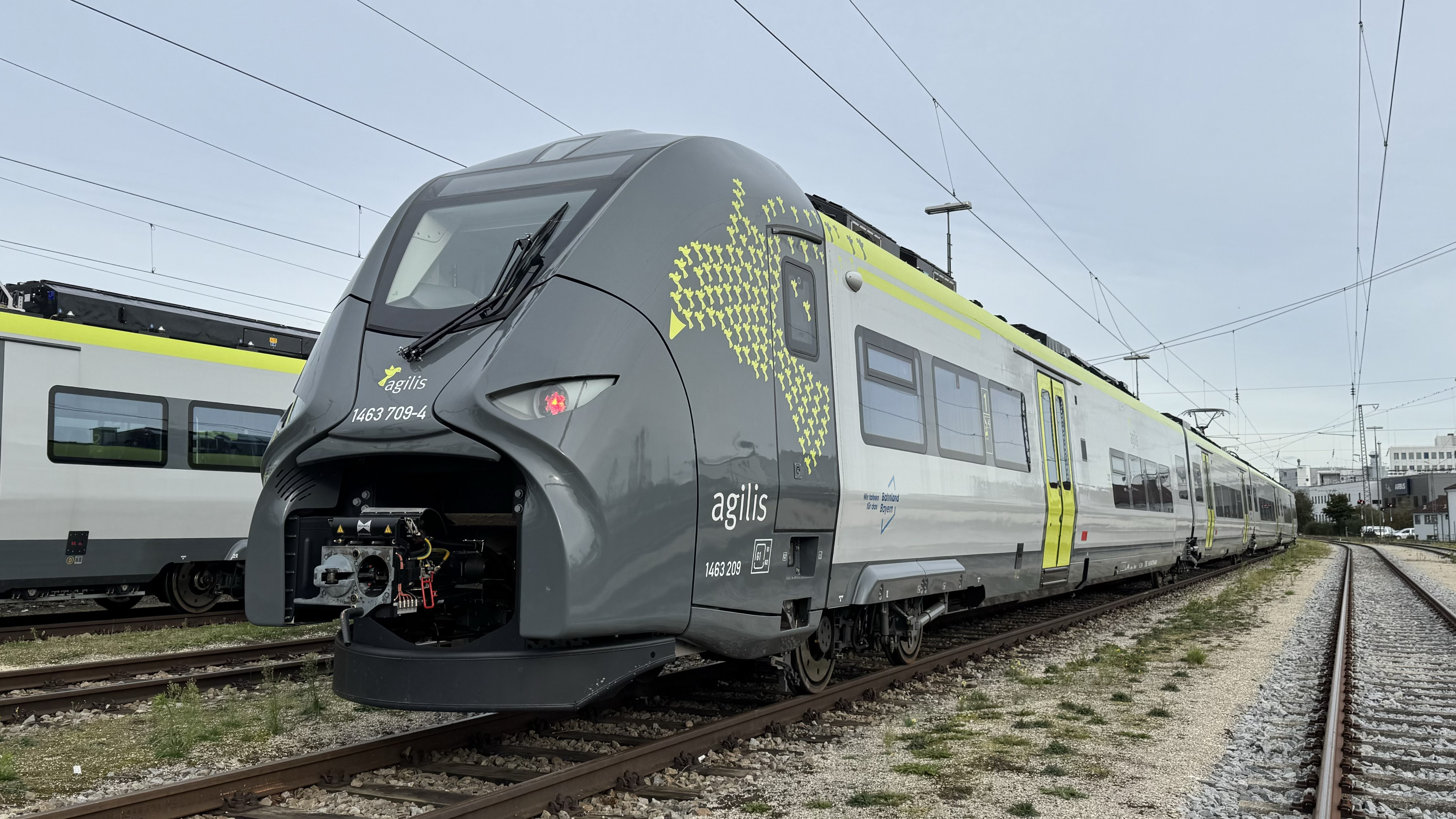
- Mireo (Baseline) with 3 front windows
- Stock type: Electric multiple unit
- Fleet numbers: 3-car: 0463, 2463; 4-car: 1463; Smart 3-car: 3464

Specifications
- Train length: 3-car: 69.86 metres (229.2 ft); 4-car: 89.66 metres (294.2 ft)
- Width: 2.808 m (9 ft 2.6 in)
- Maximum speed: 160 kilometres per hour (99 mph)
- UIC classification: Bo′(2′)(2′)(2′)Bo′; Bo′(2′)(2′)(Bo′)Bo′
- Safety systems: ETCS, LZB, PZB, Sifa

This is the standard and baseline version of the Mireo family, designed for electrified tracks, it is highly modular and optional to fit for customer needs.

In 2021, German Regensburg-based private operator Agilis ordered 23 four-car Mireo units for the Mitte-network. The last Mireo (1463 223) was delivered on February 5, 2025.

On September 25, 2026, during the Innotrans 2026 trade fair, Agilis’ mother company BeNEX ordered a further 30 three-car Mireo units for the upcoming Mainfranken-network which will be take over from DB Regio Bayern at timetable change in 2030, it is part of a bigger contract signed with Siemens Mobility which contains 56 regional trains.

==== Mireo Smart ====
In November 2020, Siemens unveiled the Mireo Smart. This is a standardized Mireo baseline product which only comes in the 3-car configuration and a fixed cabin layout and standard STL livery, aiming for attractive pricing and faster delivery. It includes features such as more advanced CCTV systems, improved passenger information systems, and full testing before delivery.

Mireo Smart operated by Transdev Hannover GmbH (TDH) in STL livery

Siemens Mobility founded the subsidiary company “Smart Train Lease GmbH“ (STL) in February which allows for near-term leases of Mireo-Smart trainsets. The vehicle fleet for the German market will be established during 2024 comprising initially of 12 Mireo Smart, two Plus B and six Plus H. Smart Train Lease expects a common lease to run for one to eight years with a lead time of several months.

=== Mireo Plus ===
Mireo Plus
- Mireo Plus B with four front windows
- Stock type: Electric multiple unit
- Fleet numbers: Plus B/H: 0563; Smart Plus B: 2564

Specifications
- Train length: 46.56 metres (152.8 ft)
- Width: 2.808 m (9 ft 2.6 in)
- Maximum speed: 140 kilometres per hour (87 mph)
- Safety systems: ETCS, PZB, Sifa

The Mireo has two variants to run on unelectrified sections. These can be distinguished by their longer high-floor section at the start of the train (four windows instead of three) where the additional devices are placed underneath. They are in passenger service since 2024.

==== Mireo Plus H ====
Mireo Plus H is the hydrogen powered version of the Mireo Plus. It is powered by Ballard Power Systems’ FCrail fuel cell engine, which is expected to be operational in 2021.

On 15 December, 2024, the Mireo Plus H started commercial operation with Niederbarnimer Eisenbahn Betriebsgesellschaft (NEB) in Berlin-Brandenburg and Bayerische Regiobahn (BRB) in Bavaria. A total of seven units has been ordered by the NEB and the last one was delivered on 31 January, 2025.

In October 2026, the Railway Reform Authority (ARF) of Romania ordered 12 Mireo Plus H, it is the first order of the type outside of Germany. The FCrail fuel cell engines will be delivered in 2027 and 2028 with expected commercial entry of the units set in 2029.

==== Mireo Plus B ====
Mireo Plus B is the battery powered version of the Mireo Plus. It can run on both electrified lines (taking current from the catenary) and unelectrified lines (using the batteries). It can travel 80 kilometres (50 mi) on unelectrified lines.

In August 2019, NV Baden-Württemberg ordered 20 battery-electric Mireos. They will be used on the electrified Offenburg-Freudenstadt/Hornberg line (Kinzig Valley Railway) and on several unnelectrified lines (Rench Valley Railway, Harmersbach Valley Railway and Acher Valley Railway). This was later entended to 28 units.

These trains use Lithium-titanate batteries (LTO). Toshiba guaranteed 15,000 cycles at 10C by 2019 and 40,000 cycles at 10C by 2022. The LTO batteries are replacing prior usage of supercaps in trains to store the energy from braking.

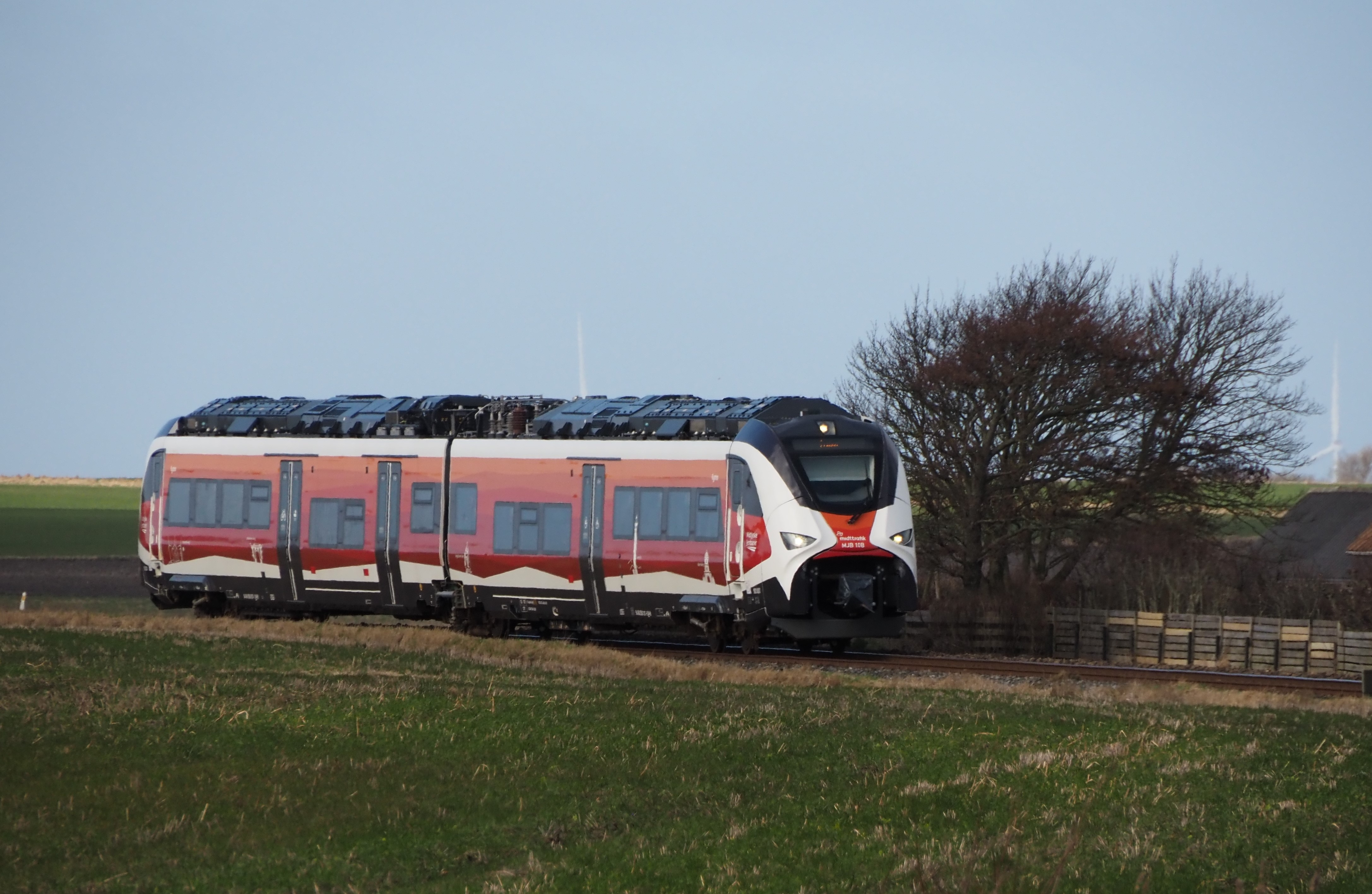
Mireo Plus B of Midtjyske Jernbaner

In 2025, Danish railway operator Midtjyske Jernbaner started operating the Mireo Plus B.

In October 2026, the state of Lower Saxony in Germany ordered 113 units of 2-car configured Mireo Plus B through the Landesnahverkehrsgesellschaft Niedersachsen (LNVG), it is expected to commence service at timetable change in 2031, starting on the unnelectrified Weser-Leine-Network und Harz-Heide-Network.

==== Mireo Smart Plus B ====
The Mireo Smart Plus B is a pre-configured 122-seat Mireo Plus B that's available for leasing from Siemens’s subsidiary Smart Train Leasing GmbH (STL), enabling faster delivery cycle for customer with tight time and cost restrictions. It only comes in a standard STL livery and preconfigured with ETCS and PZB.

In Summer 2026, the Mireo Smart Plus B entered commercial service with operator Regiobahn GmbH on the Düssel-Wupper-Express (RE47) line in the state of North-Rhine-Westphalia on behalf of the VRR. a total of 3 units has been leased from STL for 5.5 years.

=== Mireo ÖBB ===
Mireo ÖBB
- Mireo ÖBB with two front windows
- Stock type: Electric multiple unit
- Constructed: 2025-present
- Fleet numbers: 4884 001-031 (4-car)

Specifications
- Train length: 73–106 m (239 ft 6 in – 347 ft 9 in)
- Width: 3 m (9 ft 10 in)
- Maximum speed: 160 kilometres per hour (99 mph)
- UIC classification: Bo’2’+2’2’+2’Bo’+2’Bo’
- Safety systems: ETCS, LZB, PZB, Sifa

The Mireo specially customized for the Austrian Federal Railways (ÖBB) features a reengineered undercarriage design with classic bogies that is similar to its predecessor Desiro ML, replacing the Jakob bogies seen on the standard Mireo lineup. It also open up more space in the under-carriage section for additional equipment. The body is also 20cm wider than the standard Mireo.

A total of 100 sets were ordered by the Austrian carrier including 31 4-car trainsets (Class 4884) dedicated to long-distance services (Railjet), 33 4-car and 36 3-car trainsets for regional services (Cityjet).

=== Mireo City ===
Mireo City
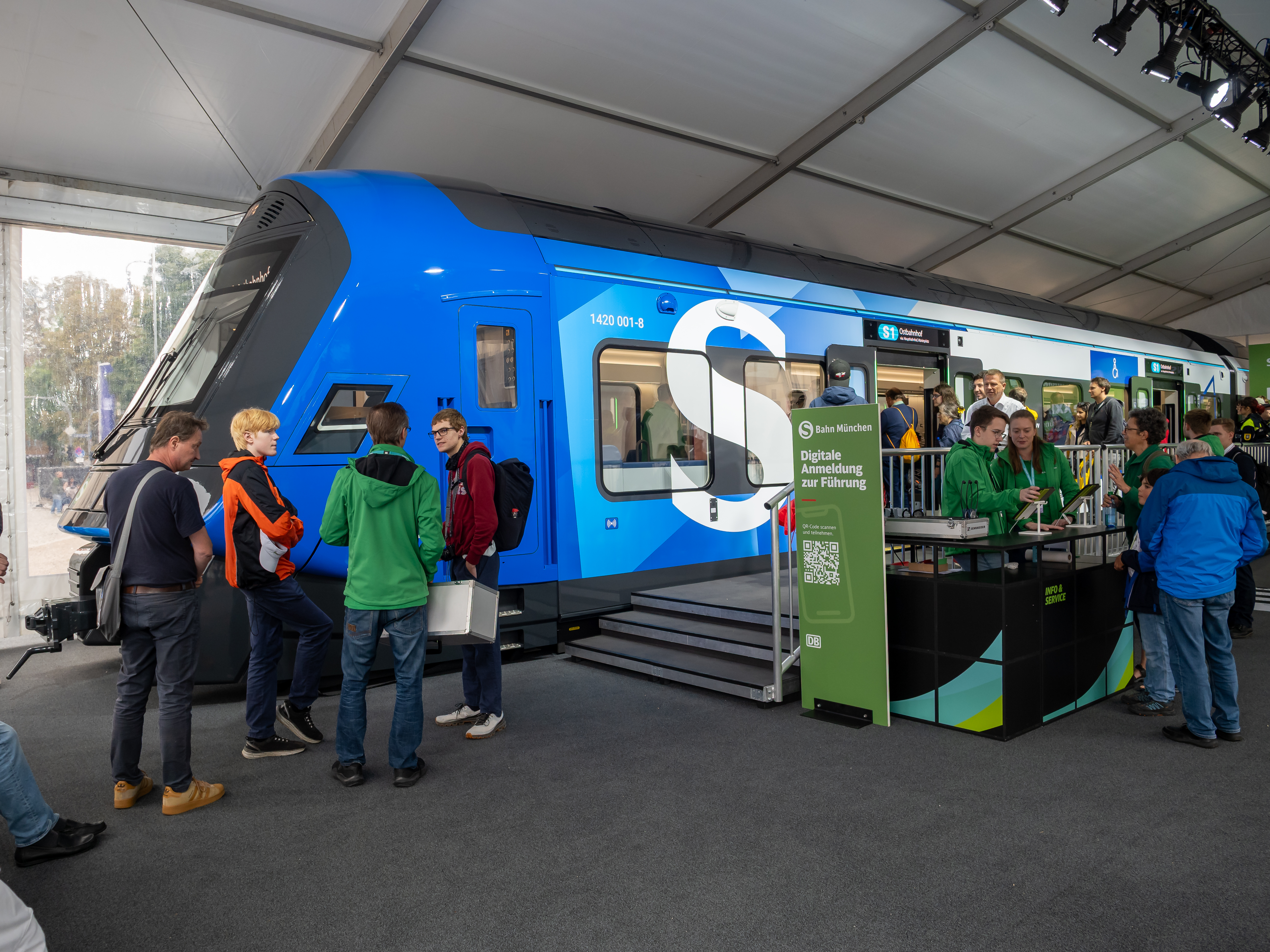
- Mockup of the Mireo City for Munich S-Bahn

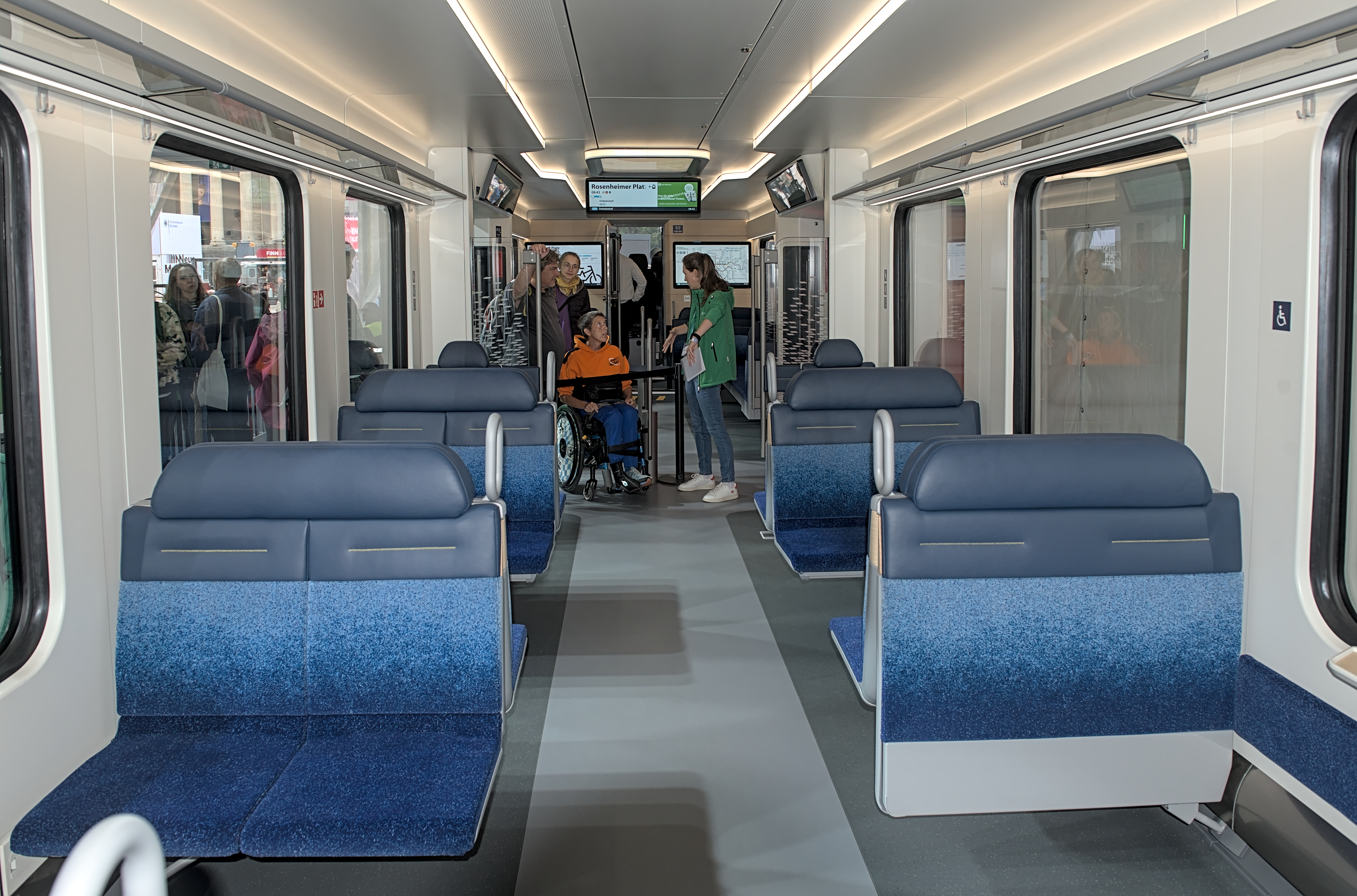
- Stock type: Electric multiple unit
- Designer: Benno Schiefer (head form)
- Number under construction: 90
- Fleet numbers: 1420 001-090
- Operator: Munich S-Bahn

Specifications
- Train length: 202.2 metres (663 ft)
- Safety systems: ETCS, LZB, PZB, Sifa

The Mireo City is a sub class focused on suburban rail transport.

The Munich S-Bahn ordered 90 13-car variant of the Mireo City and has an option for 90 sets more.

The head form of the Mireo City for Munich S-Bahn is aerodynamically optimized by a design team at Siemens Mobility led by Benno Schiefer for both directions in order to reduce drag and save energy costs.

== Orders ==
Variant	2-car	3-car	4-car	13-car
Mireo		agilis Averio Bayern DB Regio SFBW Smart Train Leasing TransRegio	agilis DB Regio	
Mireo Plus B	Midtjyske Jernbaner Smart Train Leasing	LNVG		
Mireo Plus H	ARF HEB			
Mireo ÖBB		ÖBB	ÖBB	
Mireo City				BEG

== See Also ==
Families of multiple units with similar design sold in the EU:

- Alstom Coradia
- CAF Civity
- CRRC ZEMU03
- Hitachi A-Train
- Newag Implus
- Pesa Elf
- Stadler FLIRT
