= Templin Stadt station =

Railway station in Templin, Germany

Templin Stadt
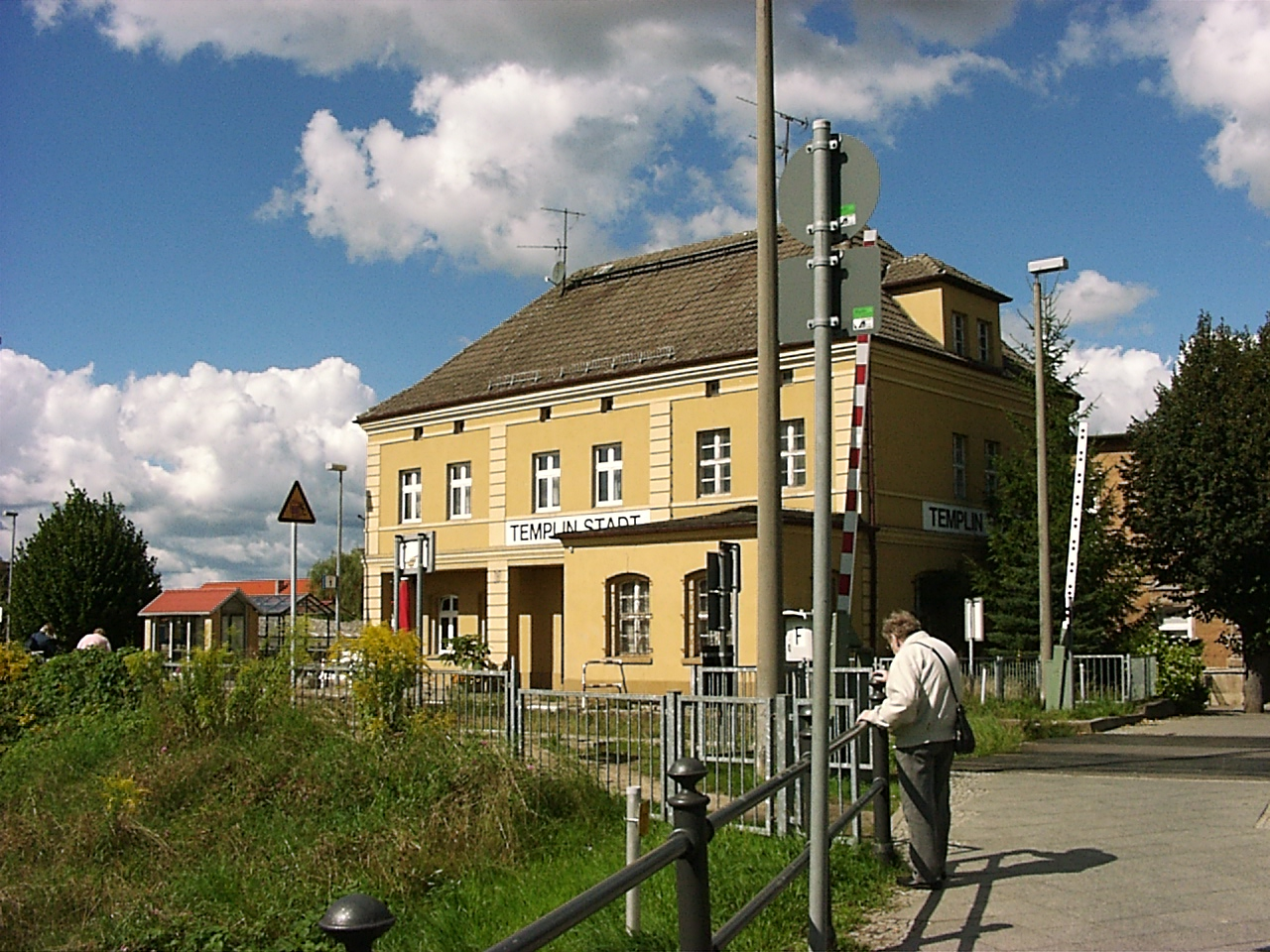
- 2006

General information
- Location: Robert-Koch Straße 16; 17268 Templin; Brandenburg; Germany
- Coordinates: 53°07′00″N 13°30′33″E
- Owner: Deutsche Bahn
- Operator: DB Station&Service
- Lines: Löwenberg–Prenzlau railway (KBS 209.12); Britz–Fürstenberg railway (KBS 209.60)
- Platforms: 2 side platforms
- Tracks: 2
- Train operators: Niederbarnimer Eisenbahn

Other information
- Station code: 6168
- DS100 code: WTV
- IBNR: 8010117
- Category: 6
- Fare zone: VBB: 4157
- Website: www.bahnhof.de

History
- Opened: 1 May 1900; 126 years ago
Location

Templin Stadt (German: Bahnhof Templin Stadt) is a railway station in the town of Templin, Brandenburg, Germany. The station lies of the Löwenberg–Prenzlau railway and the train services are operated by Niederbarnimer Eisenbahn. The station used to be known as Templin Vorstadt.

== Train services ==
The station is served by the following service(s):

Line	Route	Frequency	Operator	Material
RB 12	Templin Stadt – Templin – Löwenberg (Mark) – Oranienburg – Berlin-Ostkreuz	1x per hour	Niederbarnimer Eisenbahn	Talent, Link
