= Birkengrund station =

Railway station in Ludwigsfelde, Germany

Birkengrund
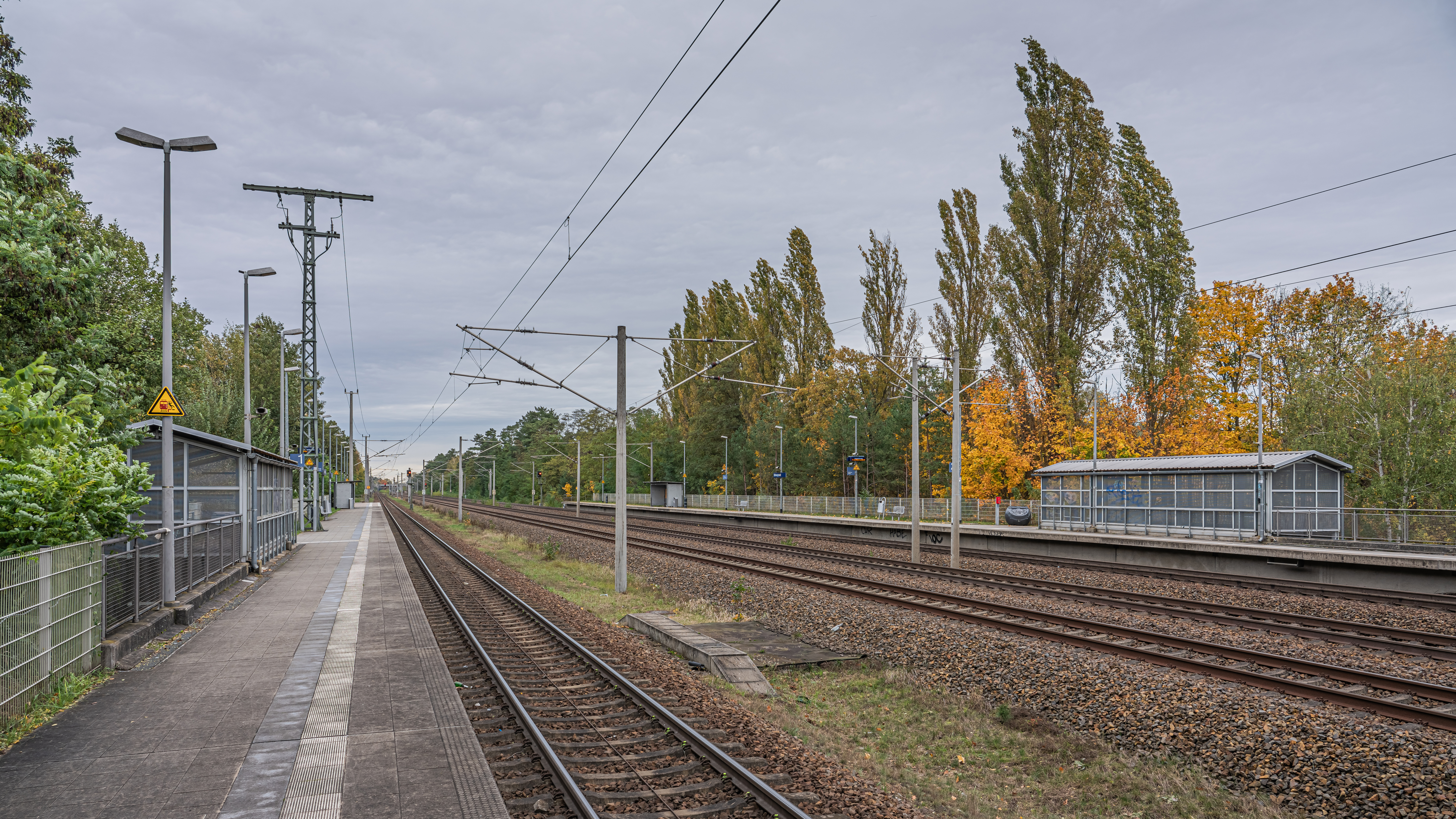
- Birkengrund railway station

General information
- Location: Ludwigsfelde, Brandenburg; Germany
- Coordinates: 52°18′58″N 13°16′24″E
- Line: Anhalt Railway
- Platforms: 2
- Tracks: 4

Construction
- Accessible: Yes

Other information
- Station code: 659
- DS100 code: BBGN
- Category: 6
- Fare zone: VBB: Berlin C/6053
- Website: www.bahnhof.de

History
- Opened: 1 December 1938
- Former names: Birkengrund Süd

Services
Preceding station	DB Regio Nordost	Following station
Großbeeren towards Rathenow or Stendal Hbf	RE 4	Ludwigsfelde towards Jüterbog or Falkenberg (Elster)
Location

Birkengrund (German: Bahnhof Birkengrund) is a railway station in the town of Ludwigsfelde, Brandenburg, Germany. The station lies on the Anhalt Railway and the train services are operated by Deutsche Bahn.

The station was served by the following service in 2026:

RE 4 (Stendal –) Rathenow – Berlin-Spandau – Berlin – Berlin Potsdamer Platz – Ludwigsfelde – Jüterbog (– Falkenberg (Elster))
