= Niederbarnimer Eisenbahn =

Railway company in Berlin and Brandenburg, Germany

Niederbarnimer Eisenbahn AG
- Logo of the NEB Betriebsgesellschaft subsidiary

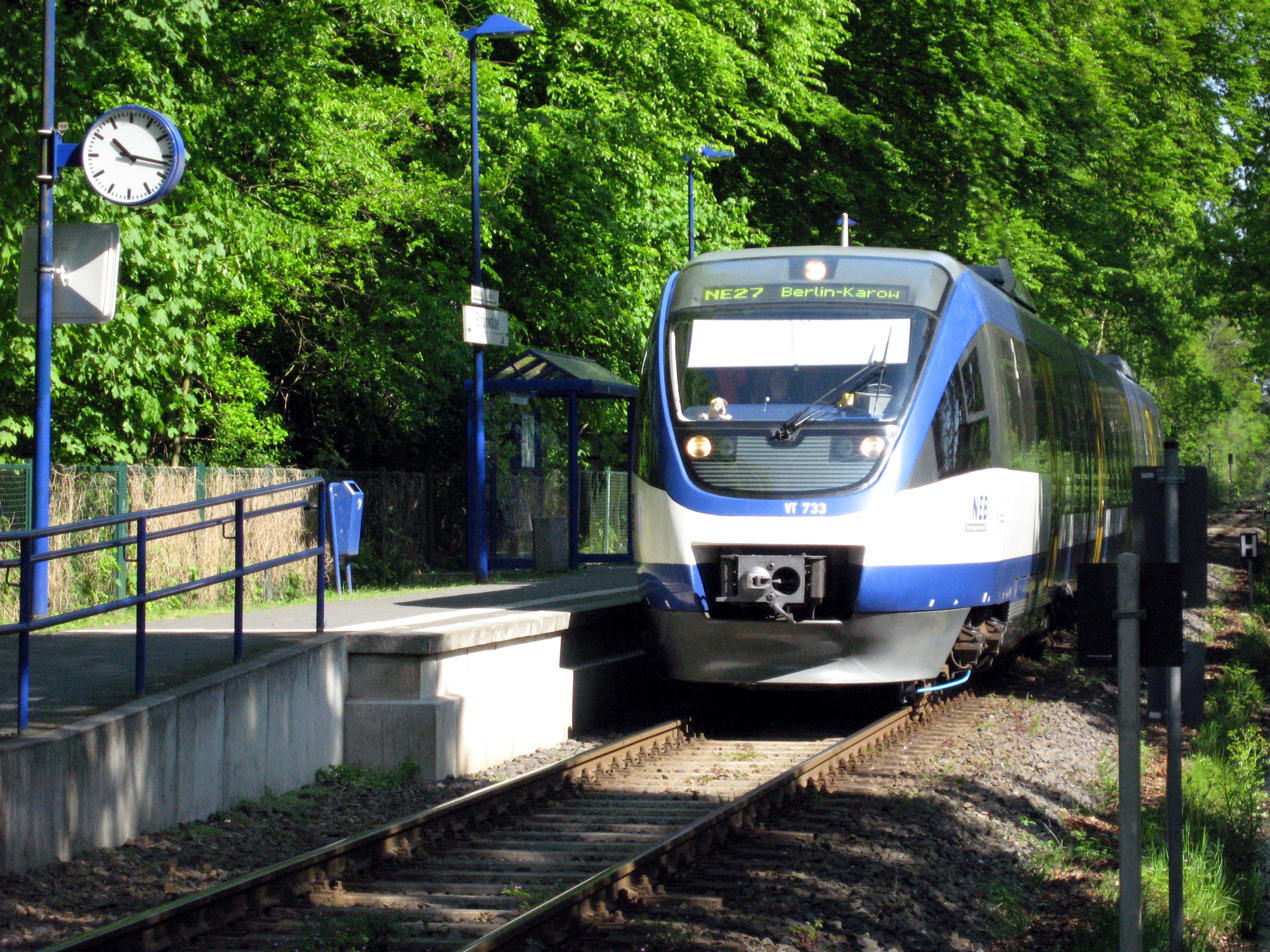
- NEB train on the Heidekrautbahn in 2008
- Company type: AG
- Industry: rail transport
- Founded: February 12, 1900; 126 years ago
- Headquarters: Basdorf, Germany
- Area served: Berlin, eastern Brandenburg, Lubusz Voivodeship
- Key people: Detlef Bröcker, Sebastian Achtermann
- Services: Passenger transportation, railway infrastructure management
- Website: www.neb.de

Niederbarnimer Eisenbahn AG (NEB) is a private regional railway company in Berlin and Brandenburg, eastern Germany and as well as bordering areas in Poland. It manages railway infrastructure, and, via its subsidiary NEB Betriebsgesellschaft GmbH, operates regional train services on its own, DB and PKP infrastructure.

== Ownership ==
The company is owned by various shareholders:

- Industriebahn-Gesellschaft Berlin (66.92%), which is itself 50.2% owned by the Captrain group (part of the SNCF group) and 49.8% by BEHALA (Port and Warehouse Authority of Berlin).
- districts of Oberhavel (8.86%), Barnim (6.9%), Märkisch-Oderland (6.87%) and Oder-Spree (3.37%),
- Association of Brandenburg Cities and Municipalities (6.16%),
- municipalities of Wandlitz, Basdorf, Schönwalde, Klosterfelde, Zerpenschleuse, Groß Schönebeck, Wensickendorf, Zehlendorf, Kreuzbruch and Marienwerder (together 0.92%).

NEB Betriebsgesellschaft GmbH, which operates trains, is a 100% subsidiary of Niederbarnimer Eisenbahn AG. Additionally, Niederbarnimer Eisenbahn AG holds 70% of Schöneiche-Rüdersdorfer Straßenbahn GmbH, the company operating the Schöneiche-Rüdersdorf and Woltersdorf trams.

== History ==
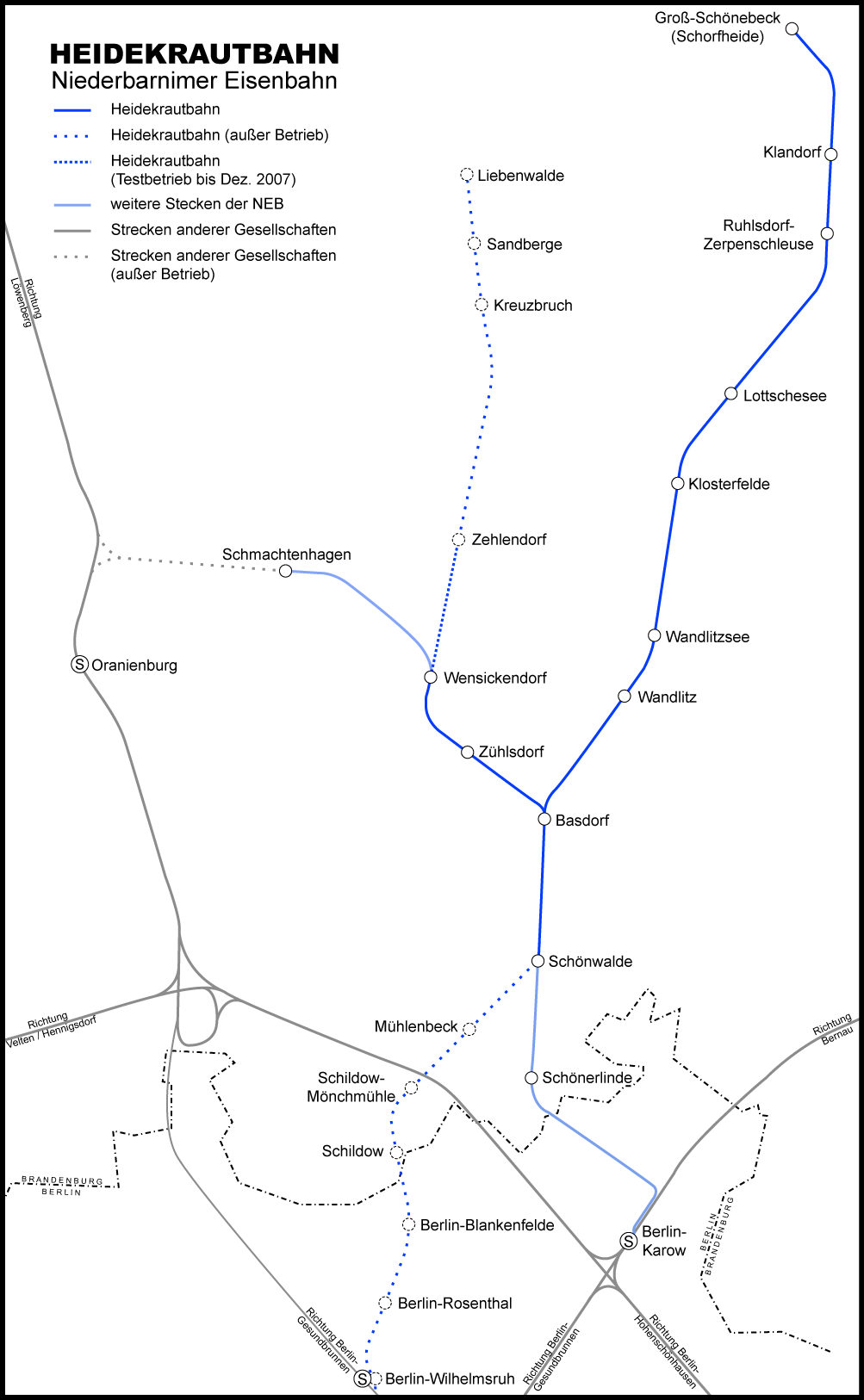
Map of the original NEB lines from Berlin to Liebenwalde and Groß Schönebeck

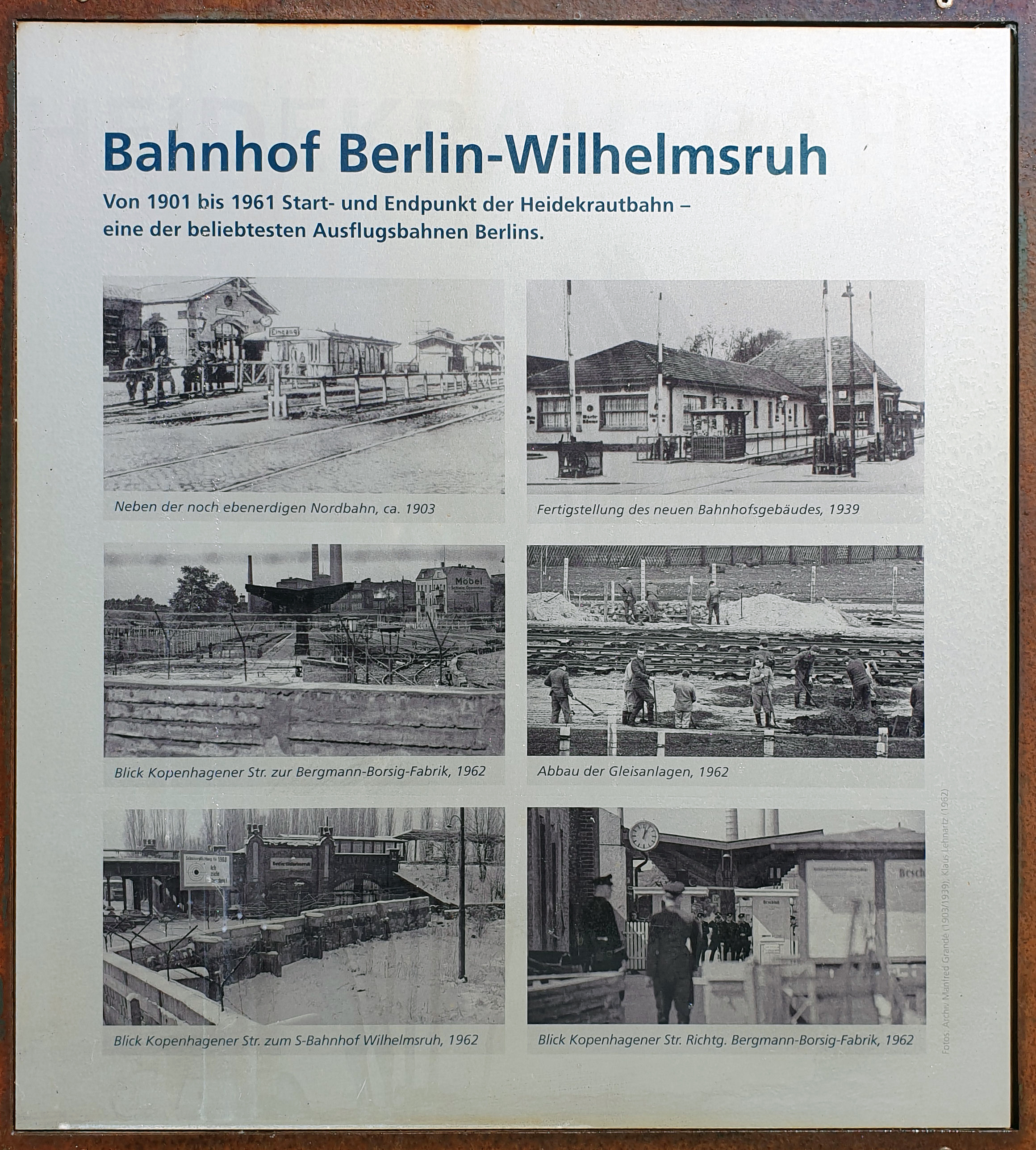
Memorial plate about the Heidekrautbahn at Wilhelmsruh station

The company was founded on 12 February 1900 as Reinickendorf-Liebenwalde-Groß Schönebecker Eisenbahn AG to build and operate a local railway line linking Berlin-Wilhelmsruh (known then as Reinickendorf station) with Liebenwalde and Groß Schönebeck via a junction at Basdorf. Said railway opened on 21 May 1901. On 8 January 1927, the company received its current name, Niederbarnimer Eisenbahn-Aktiengesellschaft. Becoming a popular excursion line for Berliners, the nickname Heidekrautbahn (“the heather train”) was coined in the 1920s.

After the Second World War, NEB found itself running from Soviet-occupied Brandenburg into West Berlin. As part of the socialist reforms of East Germany, all private railways in the country were seized and nationalised into the Deutsche Reichsbahn. Uniquely, as it also held assets in West Berlin, NEB kept being a legal entity and only conferred the "management and right of use" of all its assets to Deutsche Reichsbahn by contract in 1950. This contract contained a clause about a renegotiation in the case of the reunification of Berlin.

Effectively, the trains and infrastructure on the former NEB network were run as part of the nationwide DR network from that point onwards. The NEB lines were connected to the main DR network via a newly built link from Berlin-Karow (East Berlin) to Schönwalde and from Wensickendorf via Schmachtenhagen to the Berlin Northern Railway as part of the Berlin Outer Freight Ring. After the construction of the Berlin Wall in August 1961, DR passenger train service was curtailed at Berlin-Blankenfelde station in East Berlin, with the West Berlin sections of the NEB line falling into disuse apart from minor goods traffic. In 1983, the stub from Schönwalde junction to Berlin-Blankenfelde closed for passenger traffic.

After German and Berlin reunification in 1990, the NEB company became active again, starting running goods trains in 1993. After lengthy negotiations, Deutsche Bahn AG wholly returned the infrastructure and other assets to Niederbarnimer Eisenbahn on 1 September 1998 as negotiated in the 1950 contract. In 1994, organisation of regional train services had been regionalised, with DB Regio, successor of DR passenger operations, continuing to run passenger trains on NEB infrastructure until its contract with Verkehrsverbund Berlin-Brandenburg (VBB) ran out in 2005. In 1997/98, passenger and goods traffic ended between Wensickendorf and Liebenwalde. In 2000, NEB acquired the Berlin-Karow to Schönwalde line from DB Netz, followed in 2001 by the Wensickendorf to Schmachtenhagen line. Since 2001, NEB has planned to reconstruct its original main line from Schönwalde to Berlin-Wilhelmsruh.

In 2004, NEB won the tender by Verkehrsverbund Berlin-Brandenburg (VBB) to run the RB27 train service from Berlin-Karow to Schmachtenhagen and Groß Schönebeck over its historic network from December 2005 to December 2020. To comply with EU regulations, the train operations have been delegated to a separate legal entity, subsidiary NEB Betriebsgesellschaft mbH, which was founded on 17 December 2004. On 11 December 2005, NEB started running passenger trains again after 55 years. In December 2006, NEB also started running passenger trains on the RB26 route between Berlin and Kostrzyn in Poland, a tender it had won in 2005.

On two occasions, NEB has been part of unsuccessful attempts to reactivate passenger traffic on previously closed lines: between April and December 2007, a trial passenger train service operated between Wensickendorf and Zehlendorf. It was discontinued for a lack of usage with 40 passengers in total on 18 daily trains and the otherwise necessary infrastructure investment. Between December 2018 and December 2022, the RB63 route from Eberswalde was temporarily extended from its terminus at Joachimsthal to Templin to investigate the possibility of a permanent reinstation of passenger trains, which had ceased on that line in 2006. Again, the experiment failed due to low ridership in contrast with high infrastructure renovation costs. Instead, bus service in the area has been increased.

== Current operations ==
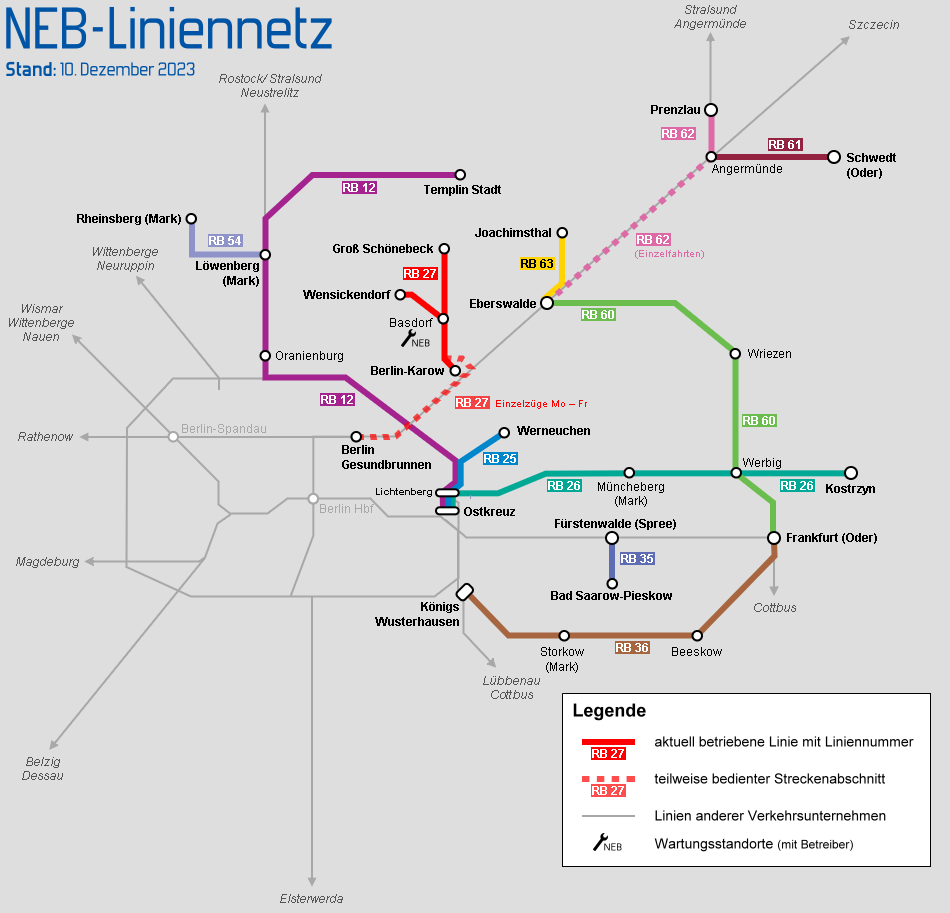
Map of the train services operated by NEB, as of 2024

After the previous RB26 contract ran out, NEB won the tender of the Netz Ostbrandenburg package, comprising the RB26 route, as well as the RB12, RB25, RB35, RB36, RB54, RB60, RB61, RB62 and RB63 routes, a number of passenger services on non-electrified railway lines in Eastern Brandenburg. The contract is running from December 2014 and 2015 until December 2024. In 2021, NEB won the renewed Netz Ostbrandenburg 2 contract for the period from December 2024 until December 2034.

The original Heidekrautbahn RB27 route was given to NEB as a direct award from December 2020 until December 2022, from December 2022 until December 2024 and again from December 2024 until December 2034. The most recent direct award includes the reinstation of passenger service on the original NEB line, with an RB28 route running from Berlin-Wilhelmsruh to Basdorf once the infrastructure has been reconstructed.

In both of these two contracts, NEB will switch from using diesel trains to trains using alternative energy supplies by December 2024: the Netz Ostbrandenburg 2 services will use battery-electric multiple units (Siemens Mireo+B; apart from the line Berlin-Kostrzyn which will continue to use some Pesa Link diesel trains), while the Heidekrautbahn service will use hydrogen trains (Siemens Mireo+H).

Since September 2023, NEB has operated a free and public shuttle train service on behalf of Tesla, Inc. from Erkner station to its plant at Fangschleuse. Since August 2024, this service has been running using battery trains instead of the previous diesel trains, using Siemens Mireo+B trains leased from Baden-Württemberg.

Currently the following twelve passenger rail services are operated by NEB:

- Local services RB 12 Berlin – Oranienburg – Löwenberg – Templin
- Local services RB 25 Berlin – Ahrensfelde – Werneuchen
- Local services RB 26 Berlin – Strausberg – Werbig – Kostrzyn (– Gorzów Wielkopolski – Krzyż)
- Local services RB 27 Berlin – Basdorf – Wensickendorf – Schmachtenhagen / Groß Schönebeck
- Local services RB 35 Fürstenwalde (Spree) – Bad Saarow
- Local services RB 36 Königs Wusterhausen – Beeskow – Frankfurt (Oder)
- Local services RB 54 (Berlin – Oranienburg –) Löwenberg – Rheinsberg (Mark)
- Local services RB 60 Eberswalde – Werbig – Frankfurt (Oder)
- Local services RB 61 Angermünde – Schwedt (Oder)
- Local services RB 62 (Eberswalde –) Angermünde – Prenzlau
- Local services RB 63 Eberswalde – Joachimsthal
- Local services TES Erkner – Fangschleuse Tesla Süd

The following public railway infrastructure is owned and managed by NEB:

- Berlin-Karow (infrastructure boundary) – Abzw. Schönwalde junction – Basdorf
- Basdorf – Groß Schönebeck
- Basdorf – Schmachtenhagen
- Abzw. Schönwalde junction – Berlin-Wilhelmsruh (km 1.2)

== Fleet ==
NEB currently operates a fleet of 31 Siemens Mireo+B battery electric multiple units, 7 Siemens Mireo+H hydrogen multiple units and 11 PESA LINK diesel multiple units. In addition, 16 Bombardier Talent DMUs, 10 Stadler Regio-Shuttle RS1 railcars have been used. A further 3 Stadler GTW are on loan from ODEG, and loco-hauled stock from DB Regio.

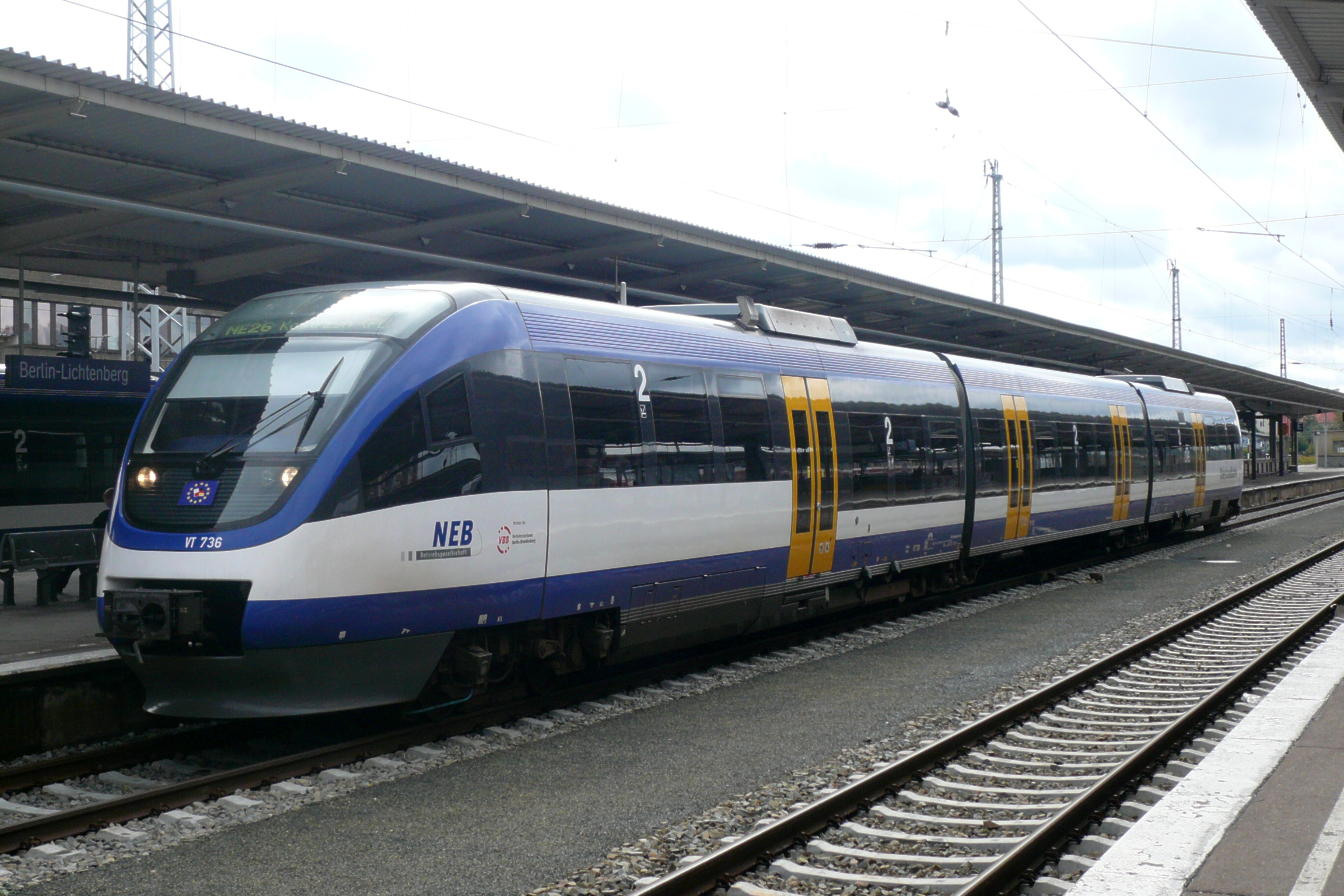
A Bombardier Talent operated by NEB at Berlin-Lichtenberg.

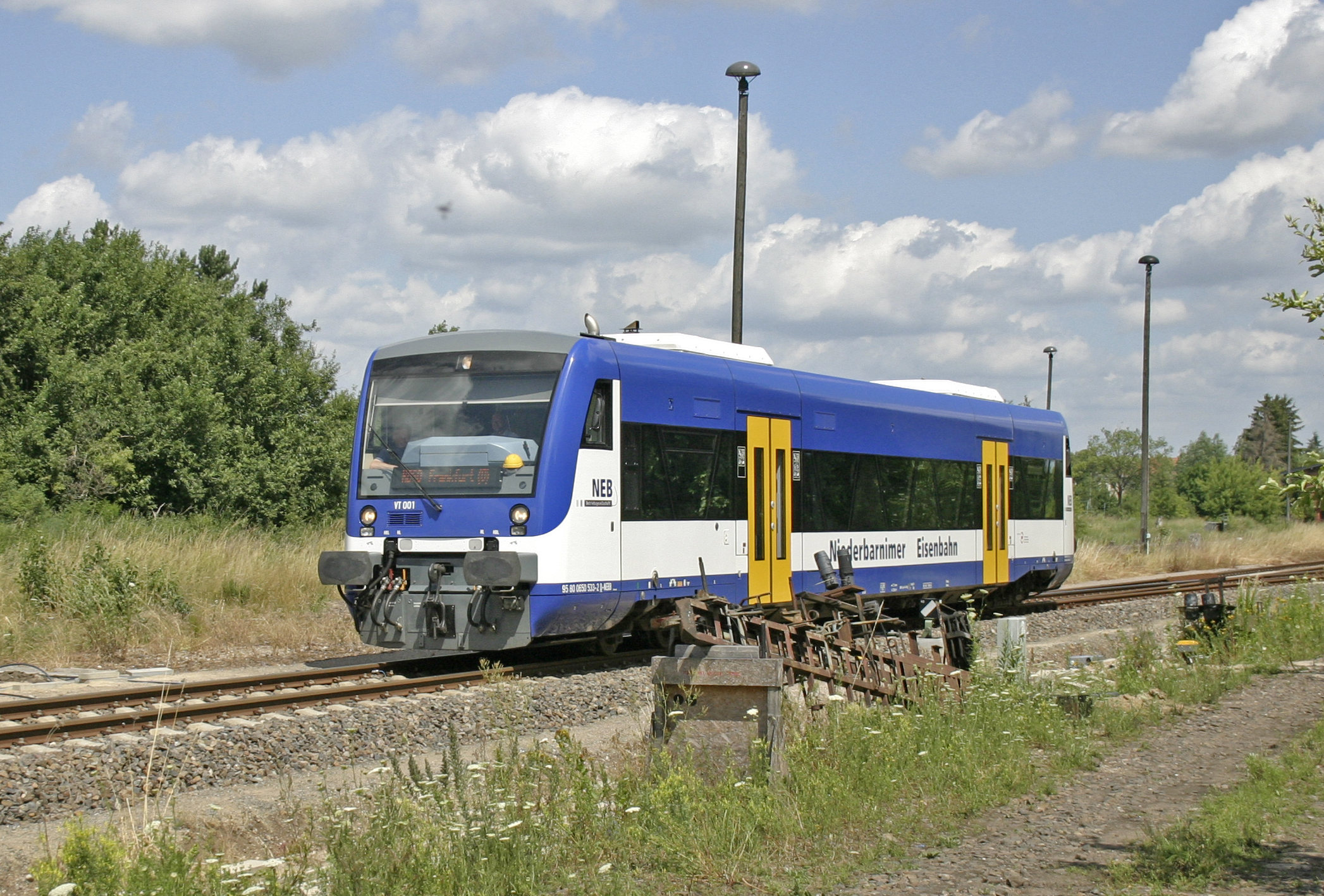
A Regio Shuttle operated by NEB.

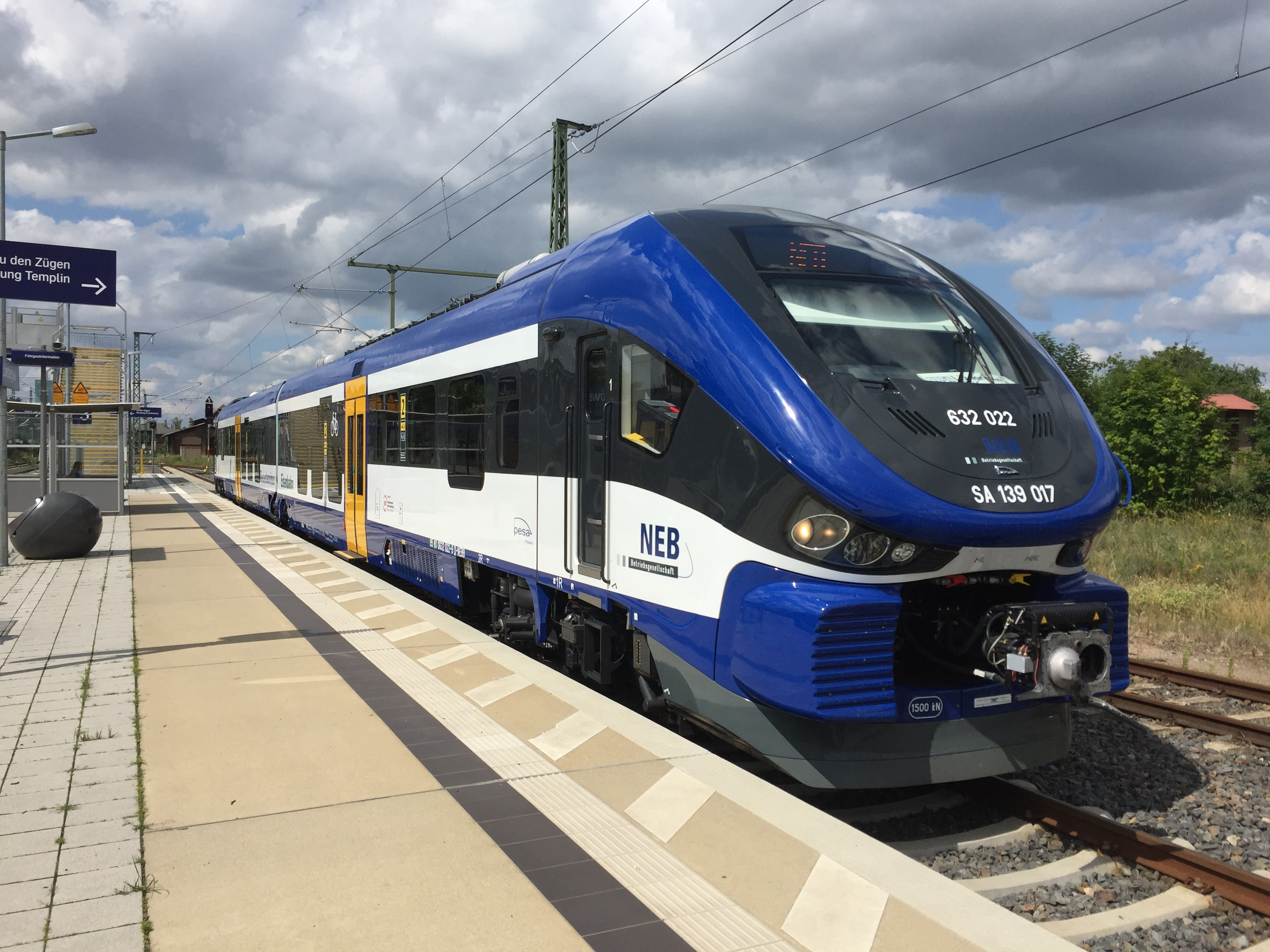
A PESA Link DMU operated by NEB.
