= Verkehrsverbund Berlin-Brandenburg =

Transit district serving Berlin and Brandenburg, Germany

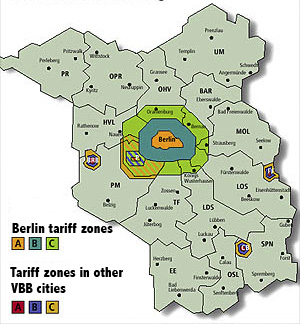
VBB fare structure

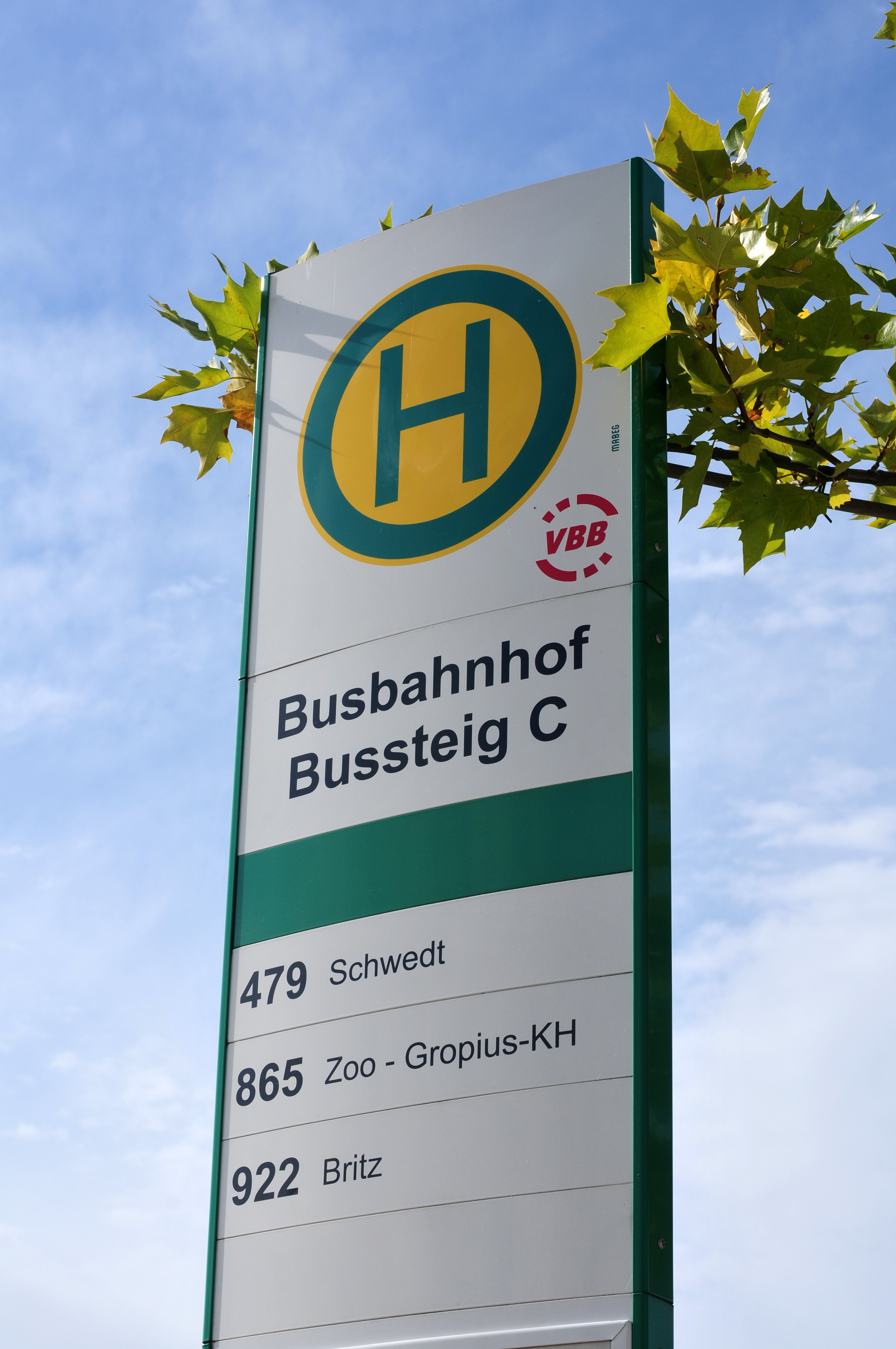

Ridership between 2000 and 2013

The Verkehrsverbund Berlin-Brandenburg (VBB) is a transport association run by public transport providers in the German states of Berlin and Brandenburg. It is a private limited company owned jointly by the states of Berlin and Brandenburg (with one third each) and the 18 districts and district-free cities of Brandenburg with 1.85% each. It was founded on 30 December 1996. VBB claims to be one of the largest transport associations in Europe based on the area covered of 30,367 km^{2} with nearly 6 million inhabitants. Common ticketing was launched on 1 April 1999. The 2005 number of passengers transported was 1.23 billion, with 3.37 million passengers per day.

== Lines in the VBB ==
Many lines are operated under the VBB fare structure. This includes all local traffic in Berlin, such as the Berlin S-Bahn and Berlin U-Bahn, as well as all regional train services, most of them RegionalExpress and RegionalBahn lines. There are also several trolleybus and ferry lines within the VBB area. The number of lines, as of 2005, is as follows:

- 43 Regional rail lines
- 16 Berlin S-Bahn lines
- 9 Berlin U-Bahn lines
- 41 Tram lines (26 Berlin, 15 Brandenburg)
- 949 Omnibus lines (204 Berlin, 745 Brandenburg)
- 2 Trolleybus lines (Brandenburg)
- 7 Ferries (6 Berlin, 1 Brandenburg)

The Berlin S-Bahn network amounted for 32.43 million train kilometres in 2005. Regional trains accumulated a total amount of 38.07 million train kilometres. The percentage of rail passengers transported per company is

- 47.16% for DB Regio
- 45.79% for Berlin S-Bahn
- 4.80% for Ostdeutsche Eisenbahn
- 1.33% for Prignitzer Eisenbahn
- 0.52% for Niederbarnimer Eisenbahn
- 0.40% for LausitzBahn (operated by Connex)

== See also ==
- List of German transport associations
