= Polregio (Lubusz) =

Rail operator in Lubusz Voivodeship, western Poland

- Polregio (oddział Lubuski)
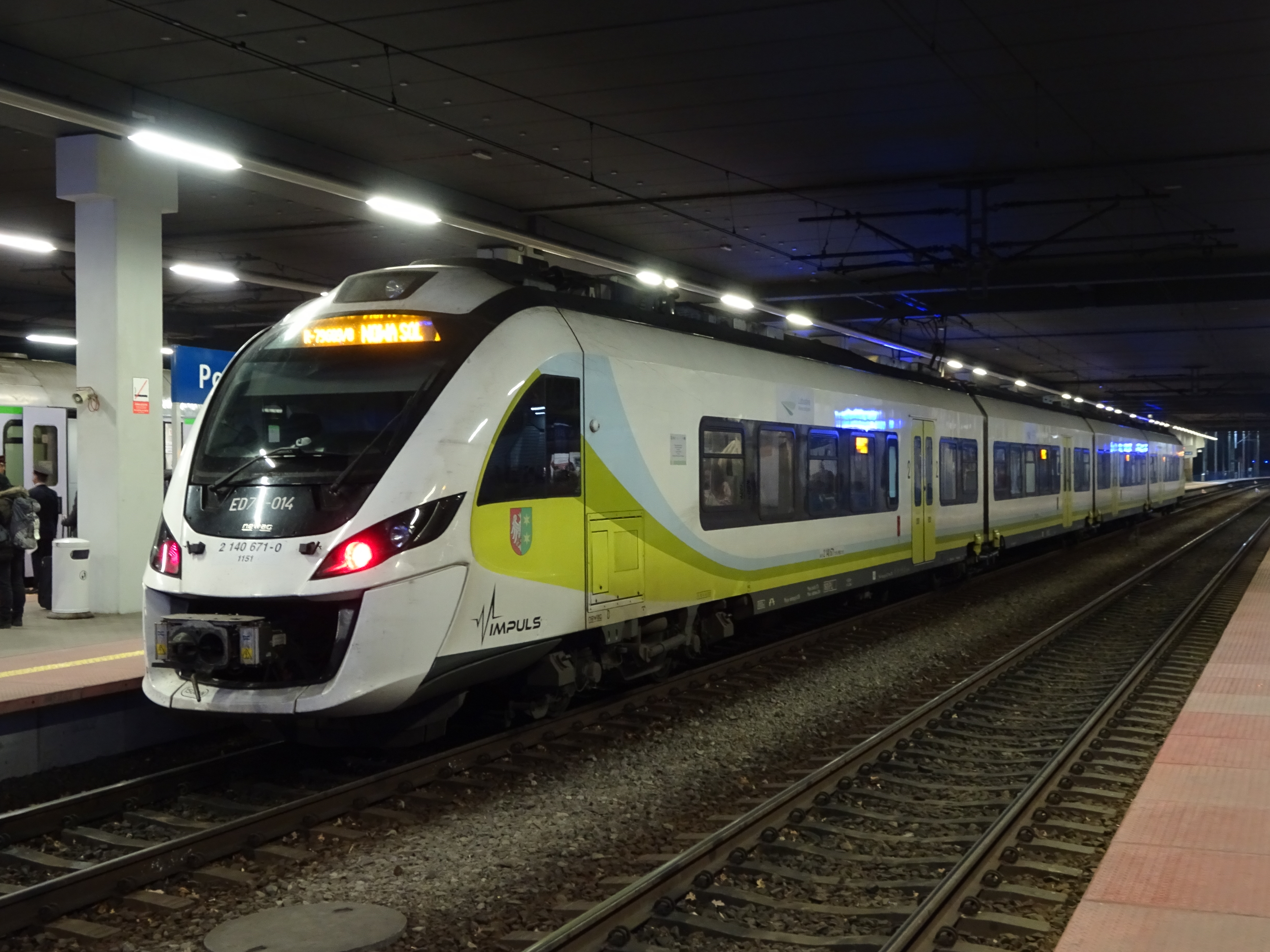
- Newag Impuls ED76 at Poznań Główny in November 2017

Overview
- Franchise: Polregio
- Main region: Lubusz Voivodeship
- Fleet: 25 trains
- Headquarters: Zielona Góra, Poland
- Dates of operation: 22 December 2008–
- Successor: Lubusz Public Transport (planned)

The Lubusz branch of Polregio is a regional rail operator mainly serving the Lubusz Voivodeship in western Poland. Services are operated by Polregio, under a contracts with the Lubusz Voivodeship, which acts as the organiser of the branch. The voivodeship also owns rolling stock used for its services.

== History ==
The modern-day Lubusz branch of Polregio came into being after the regionalisation of Polregio (at the time Przewozy Regionalne) on 22 December 2008, when the ownership of the company was transferred from Polish State Railways (PKP) to Poland's 16 voivodeships. The Lubusz Voivodeship received 55,462 shares, representing 3.6% of the company's share capital.

Following the transfer, the Lubusz Voivodeship became a shareholder of Przewozy Regionalne and the organiser of its services in the voivodeship, commissioning their operation from the company's Lubusz regional branch, which is based in Zielona Góra. It was already operating in the region before the transfer as the Lubuski Zakład Przewozów Regionalnych (lit. 'Lubusz Regional Transport Company').

In June 2010, the Lubusz Voivodeship conducted studies to analyse the feasibility of establishing its own regional passenger railway company, or an "independent division within the existing [Lubusz] Przewozy Regionalne company".

The study has been prepared. It examined seven potential options regarding the ownership structure and operational model of the new entity. Since the analysis of the study is not yet complete, the voivodeship board has not yet made any decisions on the matter.

— Lubusz Voivodeship, Rynek Kolejowy

The operator had its first electric multiple units, the Newag Impuls ED78, delivered in November 2014. The trains began operating on the Poznań Główny–Zielona Góra Główna route; their ceremonial presentation took place on 31 October in Zielona Góra. The remaining units were delivered before 2016, totalling to three trains.

=== Planned replacement ===
In late 2025, the Lubusz Voivodeship established Lubusz Public Transport (Polish: Lubuski Transport Publiczny; LTP), which is intended to become the region's primary rail operator, though initially, it will focus on maintaining trains. The voivodeship also plans the takeover and revitalisation of disused railway lines. The voivodeship noted Polregio's "unreliable service", presenting statistics showing since the beginning of 2021, Polregio had cancelled over 17,500 trains in the region—specifically 17,861 services.

Alongside passenger trains, LTP will also operate buses. It is currently in the process of receiving permits to operate from the Ministry of Transportation, and is considering to establish a depot at the existing facility in Gorzów Wielkopolski. It hopes to commence passenger train services as early as 2028.

As of late August 2026, the project has effectively stalled, with a complete lack of executive decisions. A preliminary list of routes has not been written, and the company is yet to take over the depot in Gorzów or purchase or lease rolling stock for its services.

== Rolling stock ==
The rolling stock of the operator is owned by the Lubusz Voivodeship. The following rolling stock is used:

| Type | Family | Class | Picture | Cars | Top speed | | Number in service | Builder | Year(s) delivered | Ref |
| Type | Family | Class | Picture | Cars | km/h | mph | Number in service | Builder | Year(s) delivered | Ref |
|---|---|---|---|---|---|---|---|---|---|---|
| DMU | ZNTK Poznań Regio Tramp | SA105 | | 1 | 100 | 60 | 4 | ZNTK Poznań | 2002–2006 | |
| DMU | ZNTK Poznań Regio Tramp | SA108 | | 2 | 100 | 60 | 1 | ZNTK Poznań | 2002–2006 | |
| DMU | Pesa 218M | SA133 | | 2 | 120–130 | 75–80 | 4 | Pesa | 2006–2008 | |
| DMU | Pesa 218M | SA134 | | 2 | 120–130 | 75–80 | 2 | Pesa | 2011 | |
| DMU | Newag 220M/221M | SA137 | | 2 | 120 | 75 | 1 | Newag | 2012 | |
| DMU | Pesa Link | SA139 | | 2 | 120 | 75 | 6 | Pesa | 2013–2019 | |
| DMU | Newag Impuls | SA95 | | 3 | 160 | 100 | 2 | Newag | 2020 | |
| EMU | Newag Impuls | ED78 | | 4 | 160 | 100 | 3 | Newag | 2014–2015 | |
| BMU | FPS Plus | 227M | | 2 | 160 | 100 | 1 | H. Cegielski – Poznań | 2024 | |
| BMU | FPS Plus | 228M | | 3 | 160 | 100 | 1 | H. Cegielski – Poznań | 2024 | |

== Routes ==
Source: Rozkład jazdy, Polregio [Timetable] (in Polish)

- Głogów – Zielona Góra Główna
- Görlitz – Żary – Zielona Góra Główna
- Małomice – Forst (Lausitz)
- Kostrzyn nad Odrą / Frankfurt (Oder) – Rzepin – Zielona Góra Główna
- Gorzów Wielkopolski / Poznań – Zbąszynek – Zielona Góra Główna
- Kostrzyn nad Odrą – Krzyż
- Rzepin – Zbąszynek
- Guben – Zielona Góra Główna
- Żagań – Cottbus
