= FPS Plus =

Polish family of bi-mode multiple units

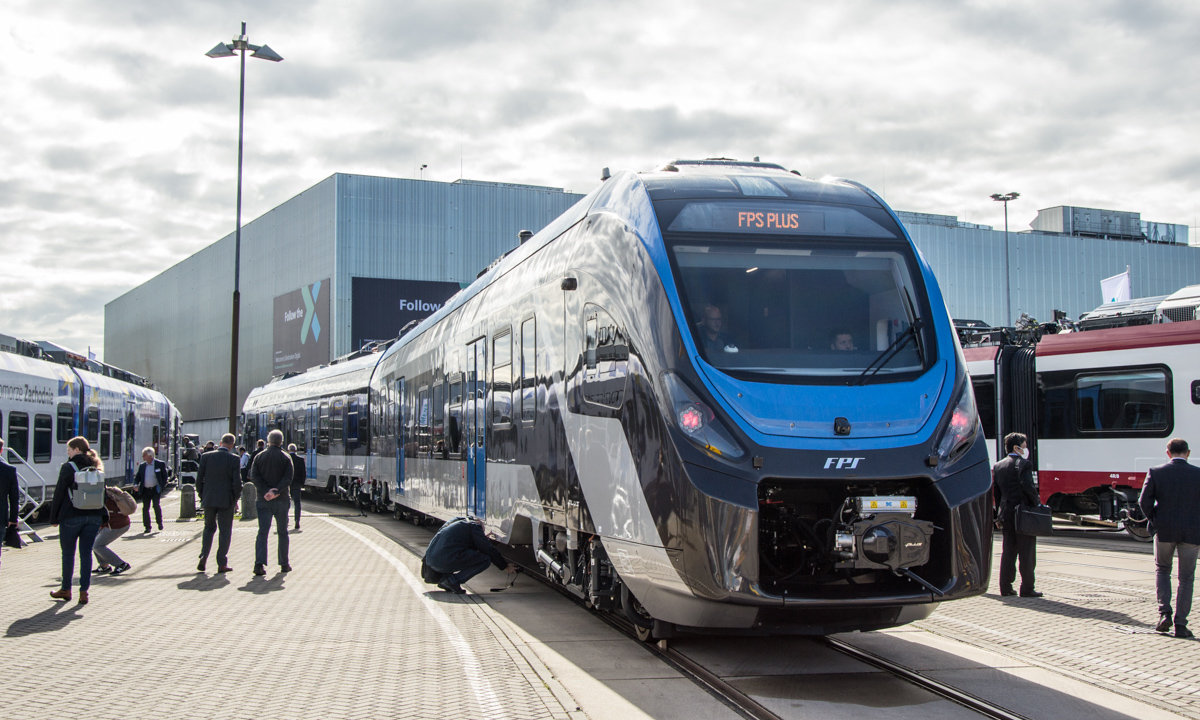
- 227M-001 at Trako 2021
- Stock type: Bi-mode multiple unit
- In service: 2024–present
- Manufacturer: H. Cegielski – Poznań
- Assembly: Poznań, Poland
- Constructed: 2019–present
- Number under construction: 6
- Number built: 2
- Number in service: 2
- Operator: Lubusz branch of Polregio

Specifications
- Maximum speed: 120 km/h (75 mph) (diesel); 160 km/h (100 mph) (electric)
- Power supply: 3 kV DC
- Current collection: Pantograph
- Track gauge: 1,435 mm (4 ft 8 1/2 in) standard gauge

FPS Plus (Note: FPS Plus, sometimes stylised as FPS PLUS, is an abbreviation Fabryka Pojazdów Szynowych Plus (lit. 'Rail Vehicle Factory Plus'.) is a Polish family of bi-mode multiple unit trains built by H. Cegielski – Poznań in Poznań, Poland.

== History ==
Plans for the FPS Plus family of trains were first announced in 2017. Three Polish companies from the rail vehicle industry—H. Cegielski, Tabor Railway Vehicle Institute, and Fabryka Wagon—were responsible for the project, which was co-financed by the National Centre for Research and Development. Initially, two variants were announced: the shorter, two-car 227M, a bi-mode multiple unit (BMU), and the longer, three-car 228M, initially intended to be powered either by a battery (BEMU) or hydrogen propulsion system (ZEMU). The operator Polregio expressed interest in purchasing the vehicle by signing a letter of intent. Ultimately, the operator withdrew from the purchase; consequently, the 228M-001—initially painted in Polregio’s red livery—had to be repainted before being handed over to a new customer.

The presentation of the first prototype, 227M-001, took place at Trako in 2021. Test runs began in early 2023 at the Żmigród test track, continuing intermittently until type approval was obtained in the summer of 2024. Contrary to earlier announcements, 228M-001 was ultimately a BMU, just like its shorter twin version. Initial testing of the unit began in December 2023, and a year later, on 19 December 2024, it received authorisation for service. Shortly after its acquisition, the vehicle was handed over to the Lubusz Voivodeship for operation.

== Variants ==
=== 227M ===
The 227M, which does not have official PKP class designation, is 2 cars in length and has a top speed of 160 km/h (100 mph) in its electric mode and 120 km/h (75 mph) in its diesel mode. The train has a total capacity of 229 passengers, 84 of which are seated.

=== 228M ===
The 228M, which also lacks official PKP class designation, is 3 cars in length and has the same top speeds as the 227M.

== Operation ==
Image	Variant	Operator	No of cars	No built	Entered service	Years built
	227M	Lubusz branch of Polregio	2	1	17 September 2024	2019–present
	228M	Lubusz branch of Polregio	3	1	31 January 2025	2019–present

=== Lubusz branch of Polregio ===
In the Lubusz branch of Polregio, 227M-001, the first train of the family, entered regular passenger service on 17 September 2024, on the route between Gorzów Wielkopolski and Witnica. 228M-001 was presented at Gorzów Wielkopolski on 15 January 2025; it did not transport passengers. The 228M entered regular passenger service on 31 January.

On 16 May 2025, the Lubusz Voivodeship placed an order for an additional six units, at a cost of 245.7 million PLN. 127 million PLN of which was funded by the European Union; the trains are scheduled to be delivered by 2029.
