= Pesa Link =

Diesel multiple unit train type

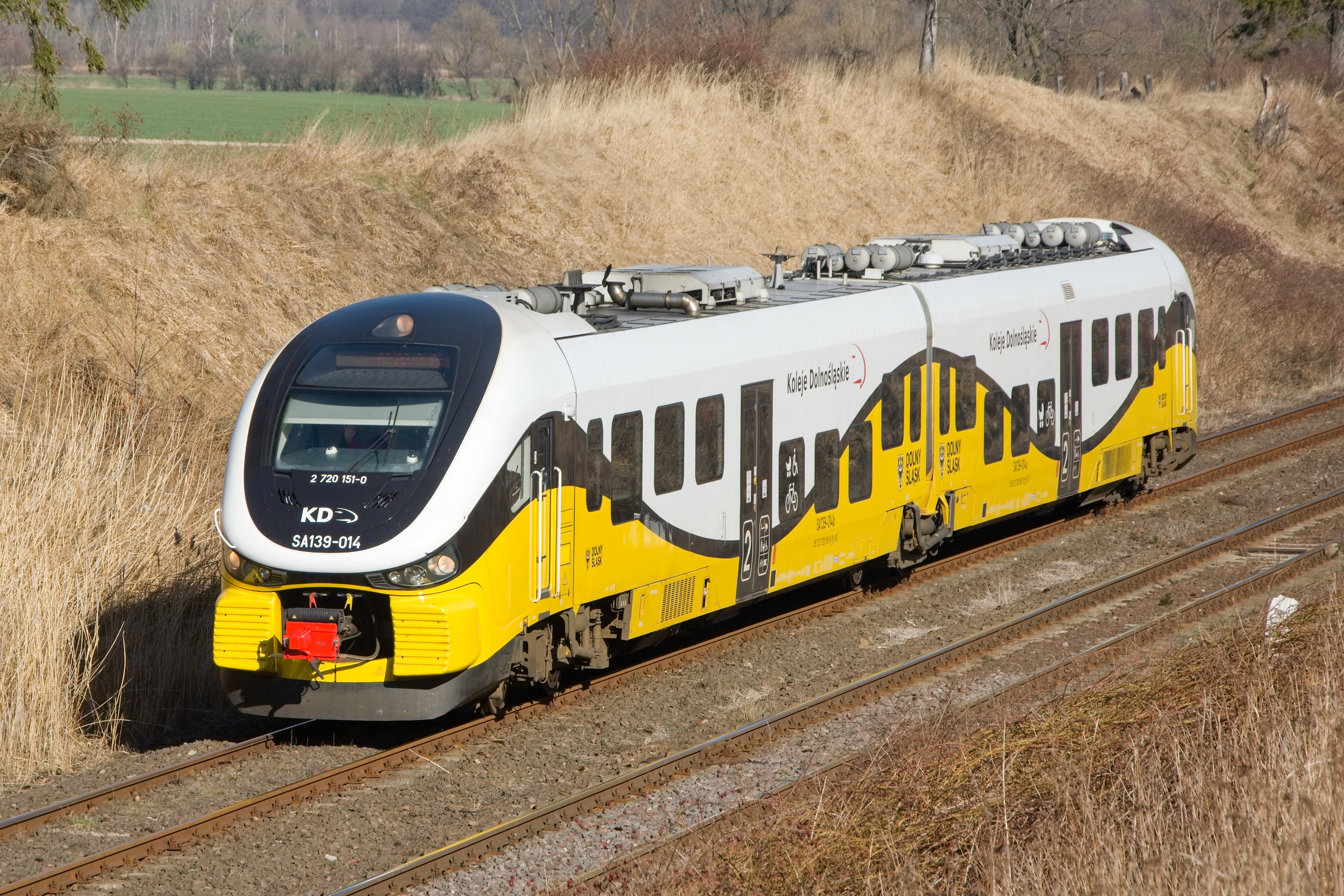
- Pesa Link as SA139-014 of Lower Silesian Railways on the Sudeten Main Line between Jaworzyna Śląska and Bolesławice in 2022

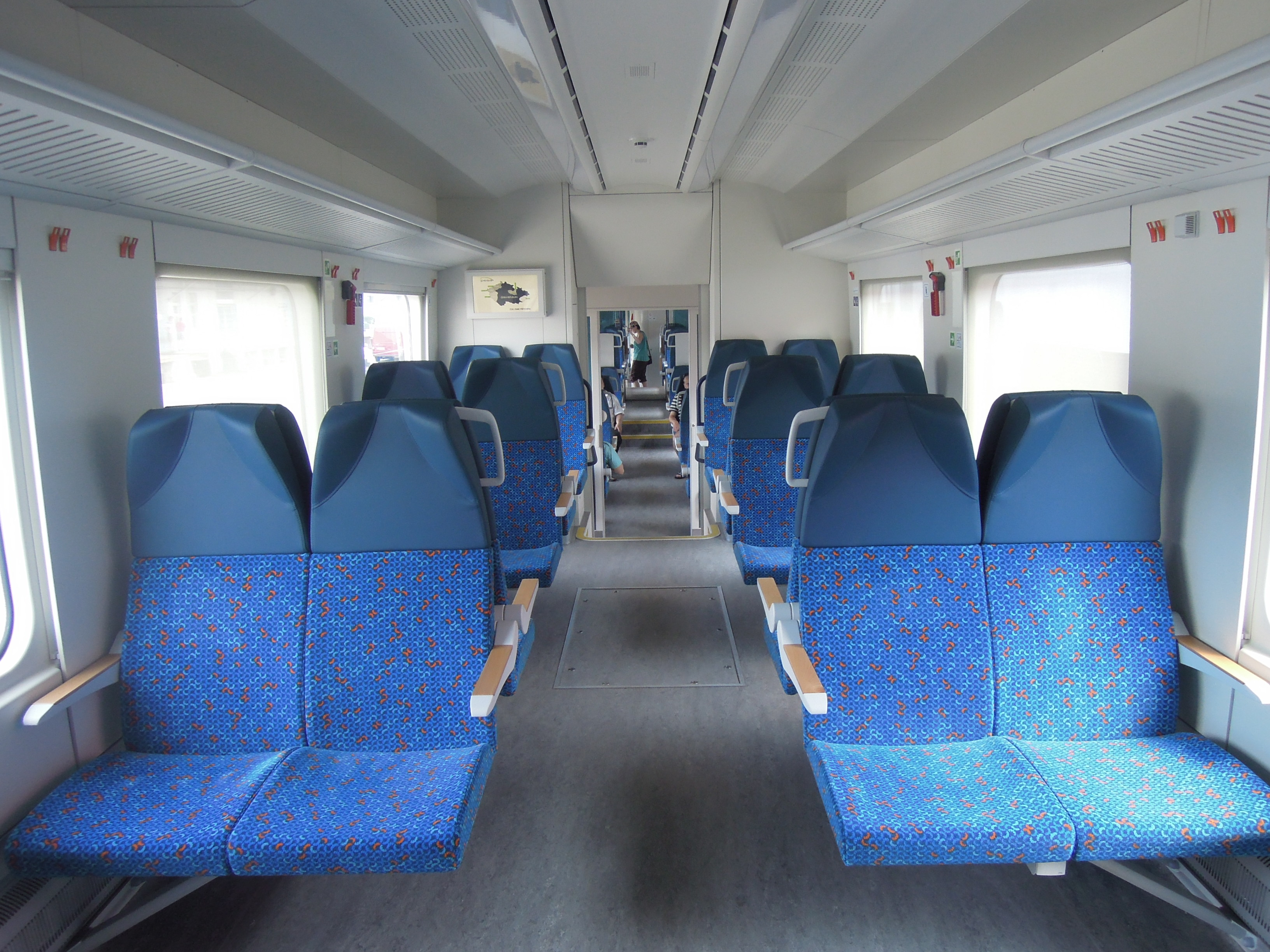
- České dráhy Pesa Link interior in 2013
- Stock type: Diesel multiple unit
- In service: 2012–present
- Manufacturer: Pesa
- Designers: Bartosz Piotrowski; Mariusz Gorczyński
- Replaced: Czech Republic: ČD class 810; ČD class 842; ČD class 852; locomotive hauled trains; Poland: PKP class SA101; PKP class SA102
- Entered service: 2012
- Number built: 136
- Formation: 2 cars 3 cars 4 cars
- Fleet numbers: 001-032 (PKP); 001-031 (ČD); 632.001-632.034; 633.001-633.049 (DB); 002 (GRC)
- Capacity: 150 (single car version); 250 (double car version); 350 (triple car version); 450 (quadruple car version)
- Operators: České dráhy; Greater Poland Railways; Lower Silesian Railways; Polregio; Niederbarnimer Eisenbahn; DB Regio; Ghana Railway Company

Specifications
- Train length: 43.73 m (143 ft 6 in) (single car version); 43.73 m (143 ft 6 in) (double car version); 57.13 m (187 ft 5 in) (triple car version); 70.53 m (231 ft 5 in) (quadruple car version)
- Width: 2.90 m (9 ft 6 in)
- Height: 4,185 mm (13 ft 8.8 in)
- Floor height: 600 mm (2 ft 0 in); 760 mm (2 ft 6 in)
- Doors: 4 (single and double car version); 6 (triple car version)
- Maximum speed: 120–160 kilometres per hour (75–99 mph) (operational speed); 140–160 kilometres per hour (87–99 mph) (design speed)
- Weight: 84.4–89 tonnes (186,000–196,000 lb)
- Prime movers: MTU 6H 1800 R85L; MTU 6H 1800 R84P
- Power output: 1x 565 kW (1x 757 hp) (single car units); 2x 390 kW (2x 523 hp) (double car units); 2x 565 kW (2x 757 hp) (triple and quadruple car units)
- Transmission: Hydro-mechanical
- UIC classification: B'2'; B'2'B'; B'2'2'B'; B'2'2'2'B
- Bogies: 32MNb traction bogies 42ANb Jacobs trailing bogies
- Braking system: Air
- Multiple working: Yes
- Track gauge: 1,435 mm (4 ft 8 1/2 in)

The Pesa Link is a family of Polish diesel multiple units developed by the Polish rolling-stock manufacturer Pesa SA, built in Bydgoszcz, Poland. The single, double and triple car units were built, but the manufacturer also plans a quadruple car version. The Pesa Link trains currently operate in the Czech Republic (České dráhy), Poland (Lower Silesian Railways, Greater Poland Railways, and Polregio), Germany (Niederbarnimer Eisenbahn and Deutsche Bahn) and Ghana (Ghana Railway Company Limited).

== History ==
=== Origins ===
In 2001, a type 214M Partner diesel railbus was introduced, followed in 2004 by its double car version, the type 218M. In 2008, Pesa introduced another model – the triple car type 219M Atribo. The Link family represents the third generation of diesel multiple units in Pesa's range. The exterior and interior designs of the multiple unit family were designed by Bartosz Piotrowski, while the driver's cab was designed by Mariusz Gorczyński.

=== Orders ===
- 17 March 2011 – signing a contract for the delivery of 31 diesel multiple units for České dráhy
- 20 December 2011 – signing a contract for the delivery of 12 diesel multiple units for Regentalbahn, 25 February 2015 the order was cancelled
- 2 July 2012 – signing a contract for the delivery of 2 diesel multiple units for West Pomeranian Voivodeship Marshal's Office
- 19 September 2012 – signing a framework contract for the supply of up to 470 diesel multiple units for Deutsche Bahn
  - 22 November 2013 – signing an implementing contract for the delivery of 36 diesel multiple units
  - 12 March 2014 – signing an implementing contract for the delivery of 9 diesel multiple units
  - 24 September 2014 – signing an implementing contract for the delivery of 26 diesel multiple units
  - 24 October 2018 – signing an implementing contract for the delivery of 1 diesel multiple unit
- 15 March 2013 – signing a contract for the delivery of 4 diesel multiple units for Lubusz Voivodeship Marshal's Office
  - 2 October 2017 – A court settlement was reached, under which the Marshal's Office will receive 2 additional multiple units.
  - 1 October 2021 – signing a contract for the delivery of 1 diesel multiple unit to the Marshal's Office, previously used by Greater Poland Railways
- 24 September 2013 – signing a contract for the delivery of 9 diesel multiple units for Niederbarnimer Eisenbahn
  - 2016 – 2 ordered multiple units, triple car changed to 4 double car multiple units
- 9 February 2015 – signing a contract for the supply of 4 diesel multiple units to Greater Poland Railways under a lease arrangement
- 7 September 2015 – signing a contract for the delivery of 4 diesel multiple units for Lower Silesian Railways
- February 2017 – signing a contract for the delivery of 3 diesel multiple units for Przewozy Regionalne (with an option for the next 2, which later were used)
- 13 October 2017 – signing a contract for the delivery of 9 diesel multiple units for Greater Poland Voivodeship Marshal's Office
- September 2022 – signing a contract for the delivery of diesel multiple units for the Ghana Railway Company

=== Promotional exhibits ===
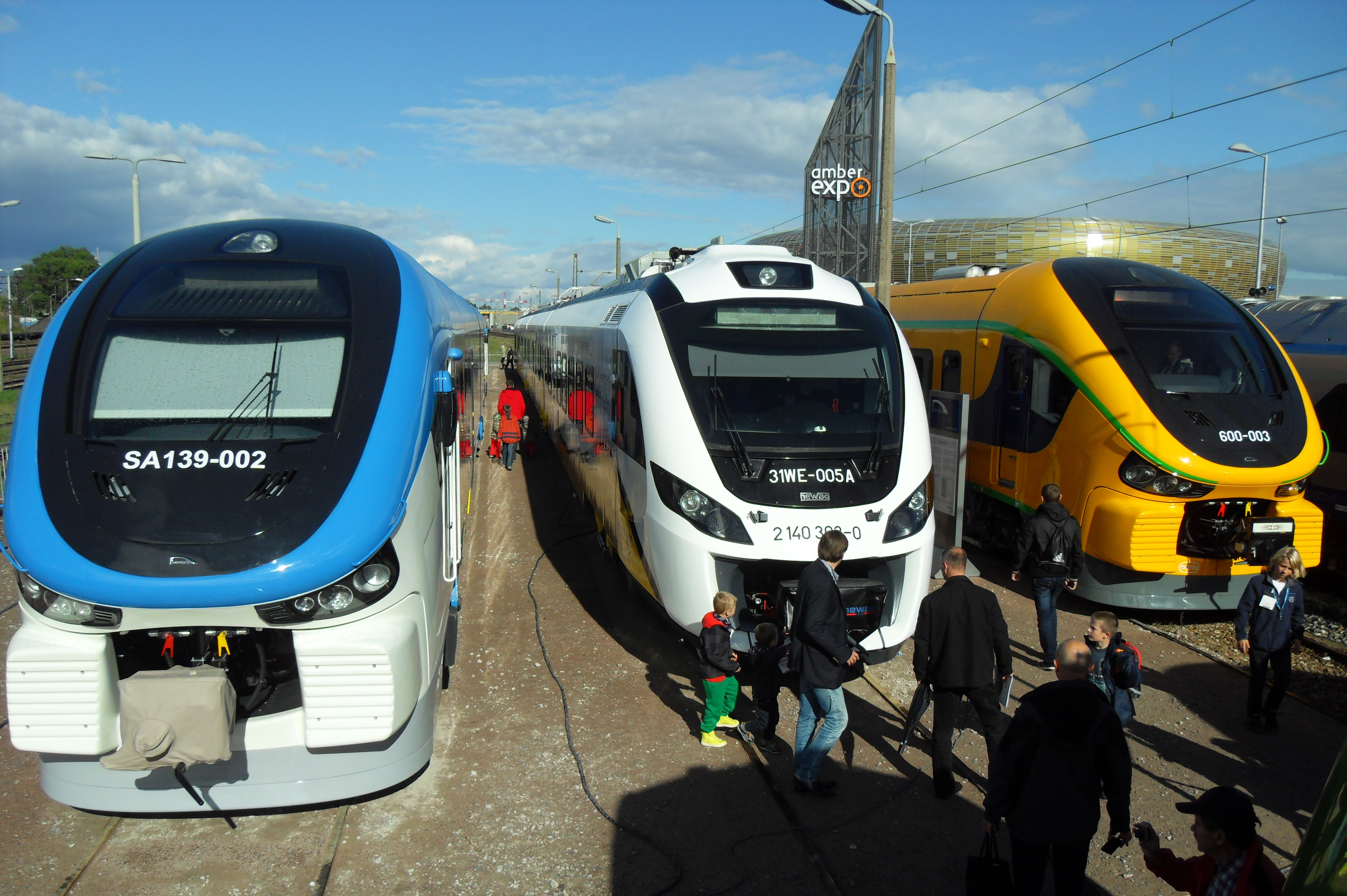
Two Pesa Link multiple units at the Trako trade fair (on the left and the right)

The Link family was first showcased at InnoTrans in Berlin on 18 September 2012. Pesa showcased a double car Link (223M-001/600-001 (Note: There were different designations on opposite sides of the multiple unit.)) in the livery of Oberpfalzbahn (Upper Palatinate Railway – a Regentalbahn brand). Later however, the multiple unit was not intended for the operator; after InnoTrans, it was sent for modification and sold to the West Pomeranian Voivodeship. Between 18 to 20 June 2013, The Link unit, numbered 844-017 was showcased at the Czech Raildays in Ostrava. In September 2013, two units were showcased simultaneously at Trako in Gdańsk (600-003 for Oberpfalzbahn and SA139-002 for the West Pomeranian Voivodeship). Meanwhile, in September 2014 at InnoTrans, Pesa and Deutsche Bahn jointly showcased a single car unit – the first multiple unit in DB livery. Two years later in 2016, a double car unit for NEB was unveiled at InnoTrans.

=== Obtaining type approval in Germany ===
The test runs for the first multiple units built for the German operator – a double car unit for Regentalbahn, occurred in November 2012. The multiple units were intended for over a year of testing, in particular for type approval in Germany. On 5 February 2013, the multiple unit numbered 600-001 arrived at the test track center in Żmigród, and operated in Germany from April to the part of May, where it returned to Żmigród at the end of May. In June, the second and third multiple units joined it, and the tests were conducted on a trainset consisting of three units.

Pesa obtained permits for test runs without passengers on the DB network, for example: test runs for multiple units numbered 632-004 and 005 on 28 September 2014, and training German train drivers; however, full authorization for operation wasn't secured in 2014. The manufacturer attributed the delays to a change in German regulations regarding wheelset assessment that occurred whilst the company was seeking type approval.

In the second half of 2014, Pesa manufactured a single car and triple car Links intended for testing. The first triple car link (633-001) was in Görlitz in October (following the completion of tests for TÜV Süd Rail certification), and in December, it was sent for testing in the climate chamber at Rail Tec Arsenal facility in Vienna. The process for their authorization (multiple units numbered 631-001 and 633-001) for operation on PKP PLK and DB networks was scheduled to begin in April 2015' Between 2015 and 2016, the Link units for DB underwent testing at the test track center near Żmigród, where propulsion and braking systems were tested at that time. In May 2016, the triple car Link was tested again at the IK test track. On 3 June, the Authority issued an authorization for service for the Link diesel multiple unit operated by Niederbarnimer Eisenbahn (NEB). It is the second diesel multiple unit manufactured outside Germany to receive type approval for operation in that country. Despite securing authorization for the NEB Link units, the work continued on obtaining approval for the double car Link version for DB; the process involved testing at the test track near Żmigród and in the climate chamber in Minden during the second half of the year. In autumn 2016, Pesa also signed an agreement with DB Systemtechnik regarding cooperation on the type approval process.

In June 2017, tests conducted by TÜV SÜD Rail took place near Innsbruck, Salzburg, and Vienna. The testing included the operation of a double car unit in a multiple unit configuration with a triple car unit, multiple unit stability at high speeds, and multiple unit status on tight-radius curves. The tests were successful.

On 30 May 2018, the German railway authority granted type approval for the double car Link unit for DB. In June, the multiple units were showcased in Dortmund for the first time, and on 11 July the first passenger services took place on the route between Dortmund and Lüdenscheid. Authorization for triple car Links was issued on 30 July.

In August, the tests of double car Links operating in a quadruple unit formation took place on the track near Żmigród.

In April 2020, the triple car version for the Allgäu region received approval.

=== Successor ===
On 26 February 2021, Pesa signed a framework agreement with the Czech railway operator České dráhy for the supply of 160 diesel multiple units; however, the agreement no longer concerned the Link multiple units, but rather multiple units based on the Link design.

== Technical details ==
=== General characteristics ===
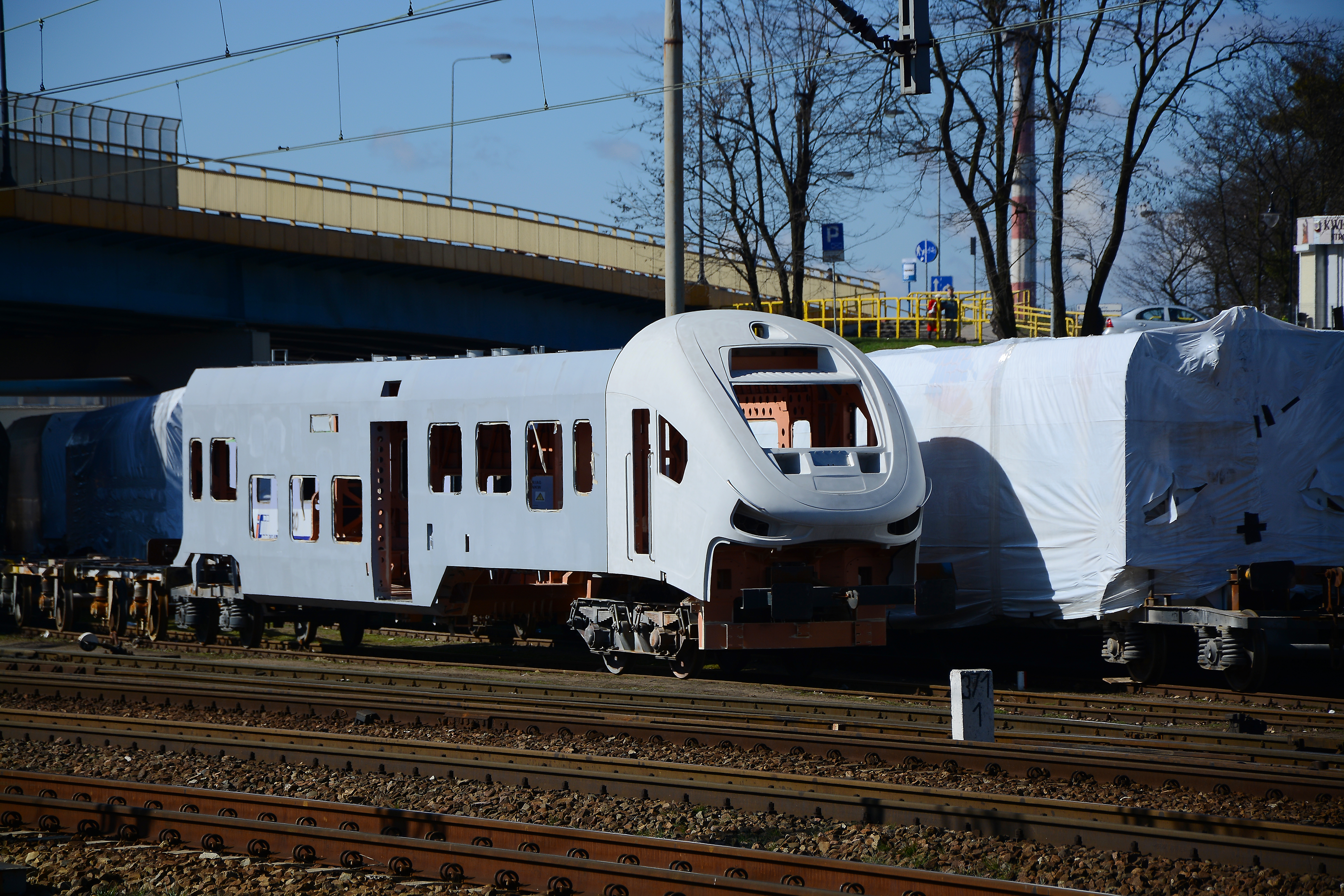
Pesa Link single unit frame

The Link family includes the Link I diesel railbus and double and triple car diesel multiple units (Link II and Link III). Quadruple car units were also subsequently added to the product range.

Number of units	Type	UIC class	Number and power output of engines	Length	Number of seats	Capacity
1		B'2'	1x565 kW	28,65 m (28,05 m)	70–80	150
2	223M	B'2'B'	2x390 kW	43,73 m (43,75 m)	100–150	250
3		B'2'2'B'	2x565 kW	57,13 m (60,77 m)	150–190	350
4		B'2'2'2'B'	2x565 kW	70,53 m		450
Source, in brackets the information according from the second source is given

==== Interior and passenger area ====
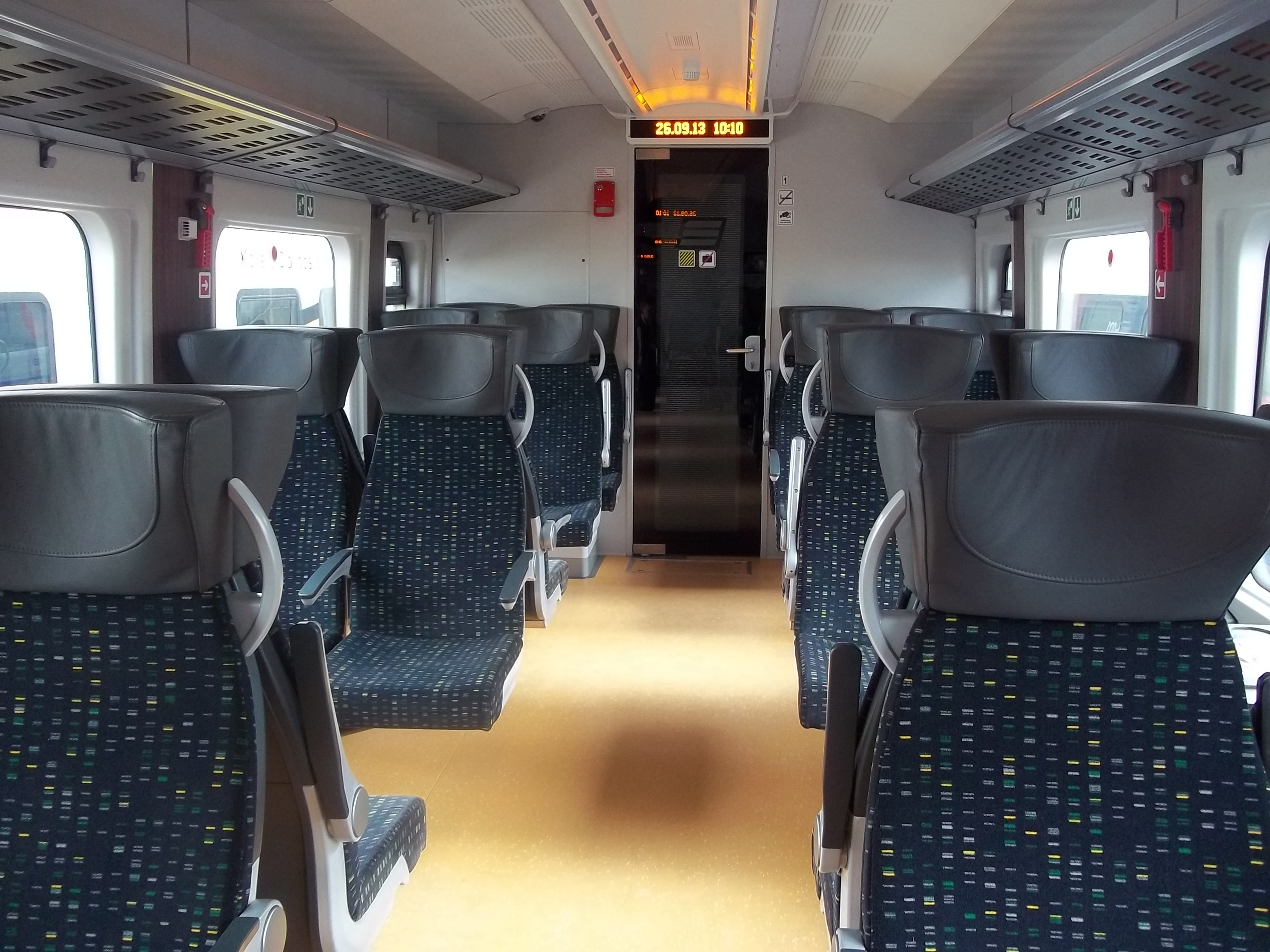
Interior

The multiple units feature a partially low-floor design with entrances (1,300 mm (4 ft 3 in) wide) located 600 mm (24 in) above the top of the rail (a 760 mm (30 in) version is also available). An additional step allows boarding from platforms as low as 230 mm (9.1 in) above the track. The access from the height is also possible for wheelchair users via a portable ramp. The low-floor section includes a designated area for wheelchair users, an accessible toilet, and space for transporting strollers and bicycles. Noise levels comply with the Technical Specification for Interoperability (TSI) regarding noise.

==== Traction and suspension ====
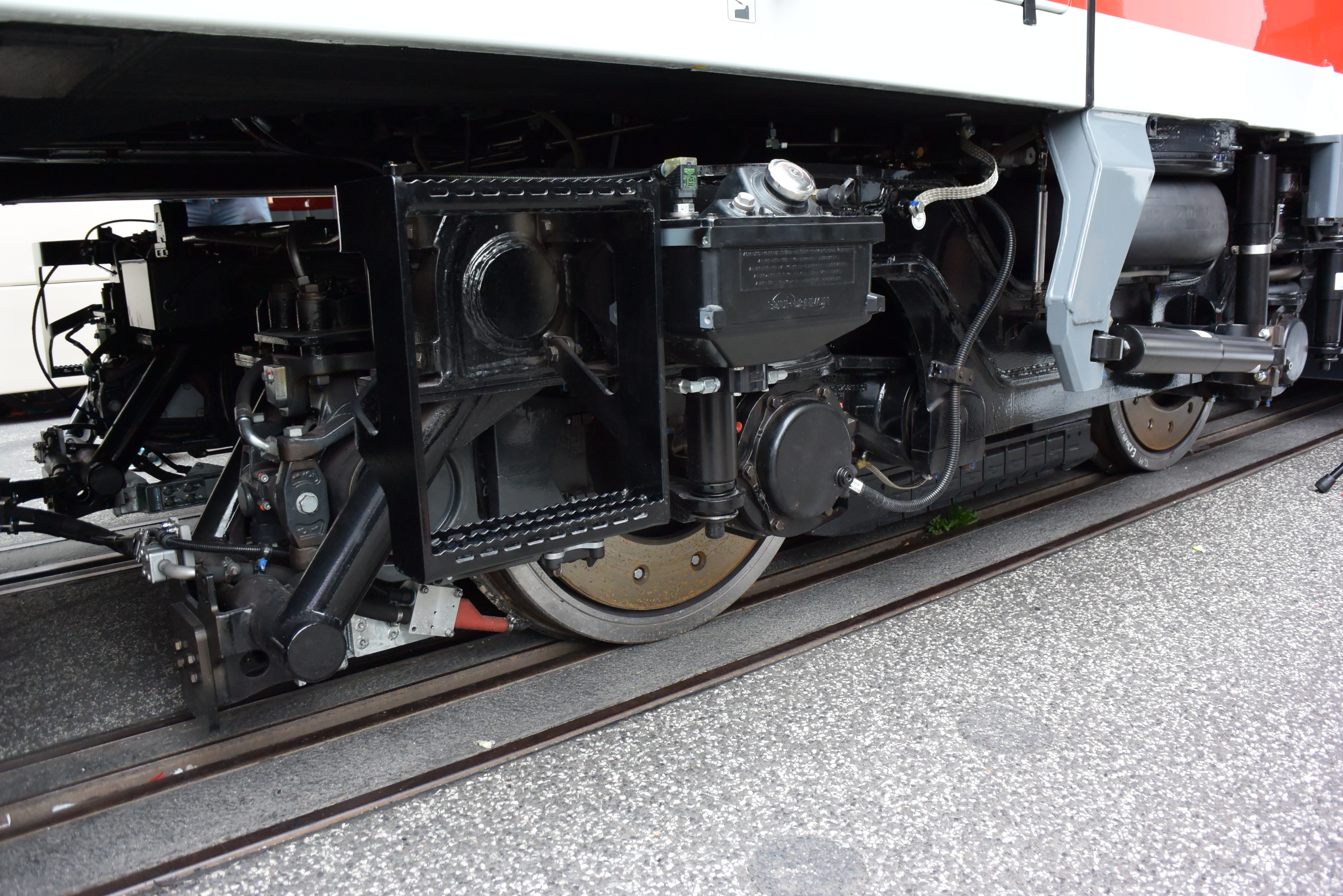
Traction bogie

The double car Link units are powered by two diesel engines, each with a power output of 390 kW (523 hp). These engines are manufactured by MTU and comply with the Euro IIIB emission standard. ZF transmissions are specified for the MTU power units. The manufacturer also offers the option of installing MAN engines paired with Voith transmissions. In the double car version, each fuel tanks have a capacity of 780 L (210 U.S. gallons) (the configuration for Greater Poland Railways).

The basic model of Link units are designed for speeds of up to 120 km/h (75 mph), they can also be adapted for speeds of up to 140 km/h (87 mph) or 160 km/h (99 mph).

The Link units can operate in multiple-unit mode (up to three units), including with older Pesa diesel models (for example, 214Ma, 219M).

The Link units run on conventional type 32MNb traction bogies and type 42ANb Jacobs trailing bogies. The primary suspension stage of the bogies consists of coil springs with hydraulic dampers, while the secondary stage uses air springs.

==== Safety ====
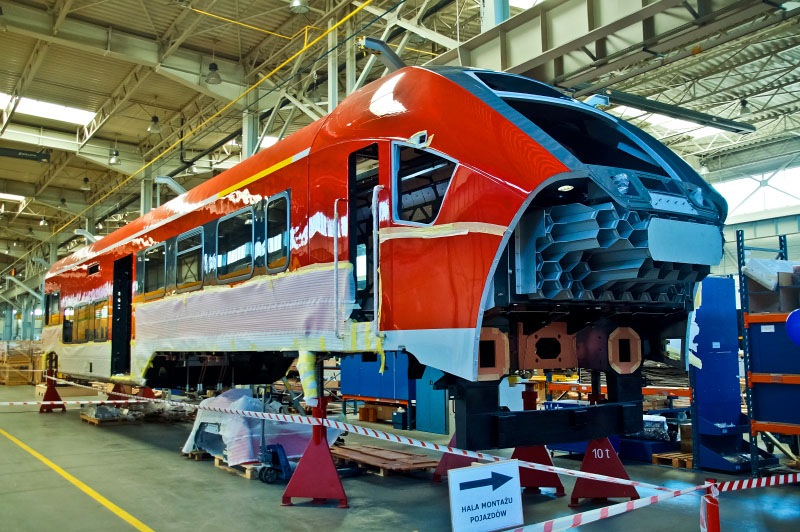
Pesa Link under production, visible Honey Comb

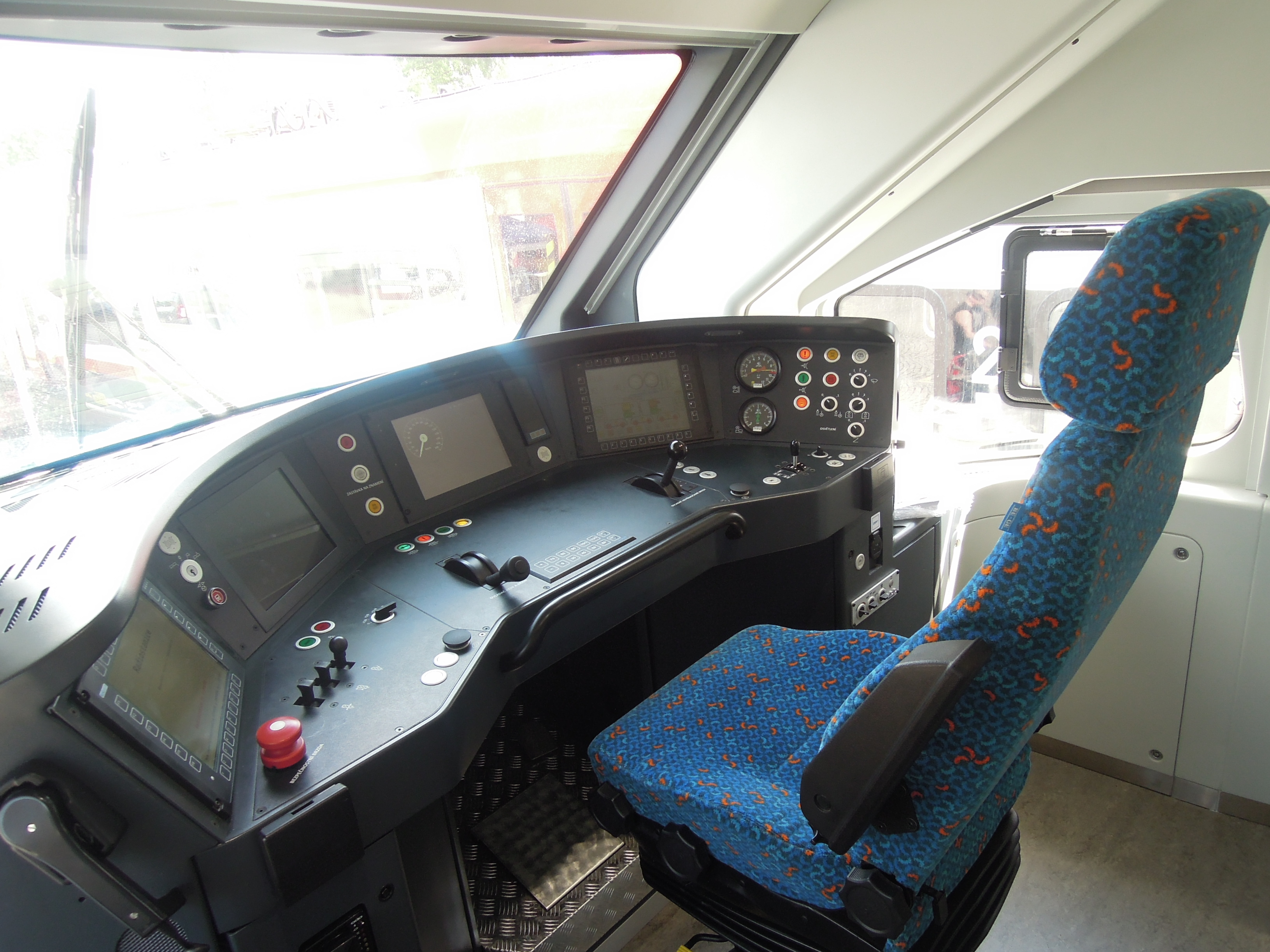
Driver's cab

The Pesa Link structure meets the requirements of the EN-12663 structural strength standard (Cat. P II) and the EN-15227 crashworthiness standard (Cat. C-1), which covers four event scenarios. The Link exceeds the requirements of the first standard – its high-strength steel structure is designed to withstand an axial compressive force of 6,000 kN (compared to the required 1,500 kN). The Link was the first diesel multiple unit in the world to comply with the second of these standards. To meet the EN-15227 criteria, the design incorporates (as in the Elf model) a driver's cab safety cage, front-mounted energy absorbers with an anti-climb system and a cellular aluminum (Honey Comb) block, and an under-frame obstacle deflector with a strength of 300 kN. The Link’s framework is designed to remain undeformed during a collision under the third scenario conditions at speeds of up to 110 km/h. Additionally, the interior materials meet the EN-13501 fire safety standard, and the multiple unit is equipped with a fire detection system.

==== Components ====
The German company SMA Railway Technology supplies SMARTcharger battery chargers for multiple units operated by Oberpfalzbahn and České dráhy. Knorr-Bremse supplies braking systems for these operators' multiple units.

=== Versions ===
Customer	Number of units	Class	Number of seats		Additional equipment	Weight	Entrance height (above the tracks)	Numper and power output of engines	Engine type	Transmission type	Top speed	Source
Customer	Number of units	Class	1st class	2nd class	Additional equipment	Weight	Entrance height (above the tracks)	Numper and power output of engines	Engine type	Transmission type	Top speed	Source
České dráhy	2	844	9	96+15	AC, bicycle racks, WIFI	84,4 t	600/760 mm (different sources)	2x 390 kW	MTU 6H 1800 R85L	Hydro-mechanical	120 km/h	
West Pomeranian Voivodeship	2	SA139	–	103	AC, bicycle racks, WIFI, electrical outlets	84,5 t	600 mm	2x 390 kW	MTU 6H 1800 R84P		120 km/h	
Lubusz Voivodeship	2	SA139	–	108+26	AC, bicycle racks						120 km/h	
Greater Poland Railways	2	SA139	–	126		89 t		2x 390 kW	MTU 6H 1800 R85L	ZF Ecolife	120 km/h	
~~Regentalbahn~~	2		–	103+21	AC, bicycle racks		600 mm	2x 390 kW	MTU 6H 1800 R85L		120 km/h	
Niederbarnimer Eisenbahn	2	BR632	–	140	AC, bicycle racks				MTU		140 km/h	
Niederbarnimer Eisenbahn	3		–	200	AC, bicycle racks				MTU		140 km/h	
Deutsche Bahn Hessen	2	BR632	8	102	AC, bicycle racks		600 mm	2x 390 kW			140 km/h	
Deutsche Bahn Hessen	3	BR633	12	148	AC, bicycle racks		600 mm	2x 390 kW			140 km/h	
Polregio	2	SA139	–	130	AC, bicycle racks							
AC – passenger area air conditioning, WIFI – wireless Internet access

==== Class 844 České dráhy ====
The Czech multiple units are equipped with air conditioning, closed-circuit toilet systems, surveillance cameras, and passenger information systems, and feature designated areas for larger luggage, strollers, and bicycles. This version utilizes wheelsets from the Czech manufacturer Bonatrans.

==== West Pomeranian Voivodeship ====
The two multiple units ordered by the West Pomeranian Voivodeship are double car units capable of holding at least 100 seated passengers (in a 2+2 layout) and 140 standing passengers. Additional equipment includes, among other things, a Wi-Fi internet access point. The multiple units were scheduled to obtain authorization for operation on German railway lines by August 2014.

==== Deutsche Bahn ====
The multiple units for Deutsche Bahn consist of two or three cars and reach speeds of up to 120 km/h (contract Lot 1) or 140 km/h (contract Lot 2). The Link units serving the Sauerland region reach a speed of 140 km/h; each is equipped with two spaces for passengers with disabilities, 36 bicycle spaces, ticket machines, and electrical outlets for passengers. Double and triple car units capable of reaching 140 km/h were ordered for Hesse.

The versions for Deutsche Bahn are powered by MTU engines. Under a framework agreement, up to 940 traction units from this manufacturer were to be delivered to the Bydgoszcz factories by 2021. The 12V 1600 R70 engine (565 kW) was selected for single and triple car units, while the 6H 1800 R85L version (390 kW) was chosen for double car units.

==== Niederbarnimer Eisenbahn ====
For Niederbarnimer Eisenbahn, Pesa prepared double and triple car versions; in addition to seating and spaces for passengers with disabilities, the passenger areas are equipped to accommodate 12 or 24 bicycles, respectively.

== Service ==
Country	Rail carrier	Number of multiple units by the number of units			Multiple unit designation by the number of units			Year(s) of delivery	Number of multiple units by each country
Country	Rail carrier	1	2	3	1	2	3	Year(s) of delivery	Number of multiple units by each country
Czech Republic	České dráhy	–	30 (31)	–		844		2012–2014	31
Ghana	Ghana Railway Company	–	1	–		none (Note: Ghana railways do not use class designation, instead it uses designation with side numbers.)		2024	1
Germany	Deutsche Bahn	0	23	49	631	632	633	2018-2020	83
Germany	~~Regentalbahn~~	–	~~12~~	–		600		~~from 2014~~ cancelled	83
Germany	Niederbarnimer Eisenbahn	–	11	–		632 SA139		2016–2018	83
Poland	Polregio Lubusz Branch	–	6	–		SA139		2013–2019	21
Poland	Greater Poland Railways	–	3 (4)	–		SA139		2015, 2022	21
Poland	Lower Silesian Railways	–	4	–		SA139		2015	21
Poland	Polregio	–	9	–		SA139		2017–2018, 2021	21
Total number of multiple units: 136

=== České dráhy ===
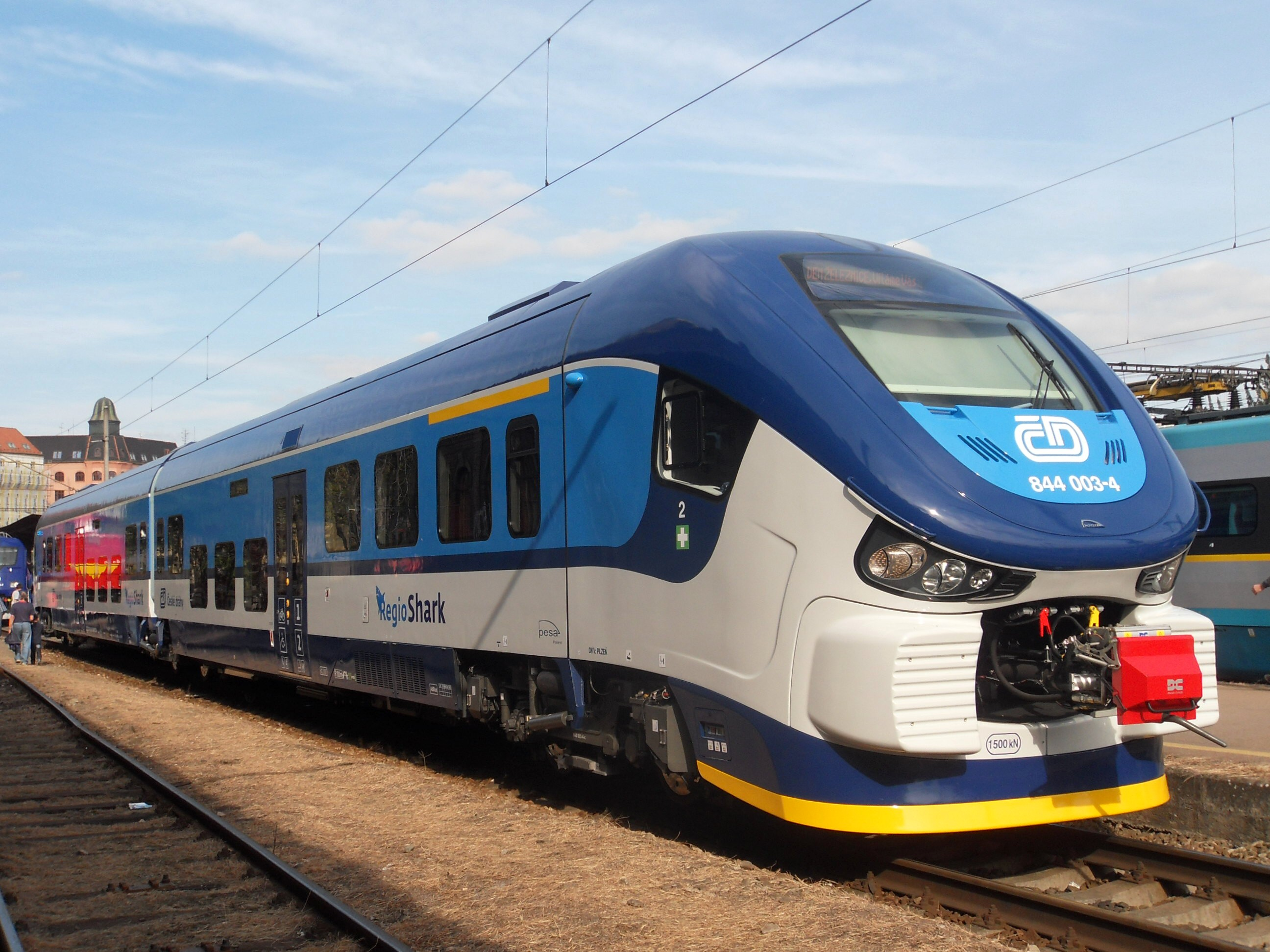
Pesa Link presentation at Brno hlavní nádraží

On 17 March 2011, a contract was signed for the delivery of 31 Pesa Link multiple units to the operator České dráhy. The multiple units were intended for service on regional routes in the Karlovy Vary, Plzeň, Ústí nad Labem, and Zlín regions. The Link units replaced older Class 810, 842, and 854 railcars, as well as some locomotive-hauled trains.

The prototype 844-001 arrived on 10 May 2012, for a month of testing at the Velim test track in the Czech Republic. Following the publication of the first photos, the multiple unit was nicknamed "Shark" by rail enthusiasts, prompting ČD management to give the Czech Link units the official name RegioShark. The name echoes the designations of the Czech electric multiple units CityElefant and RegioPanter.

On 10 September 2012, the first two units (001 and 002) arrived at the Česká Třebová locomotive depot. Multiple unit 844-003 was delivered to the same location on 14 September. The ceremonial inauguration of passenger service took place on 21 September 2012, on the Plzeň–Domažlice route. The final unit was delivered on 16 January 2014.

=== Ghana Railways Company ===
In September 2022, a contract was signed with a Ghanaian operator for the delivery of two diesel multiple units of two different types, with an option for additional ten multiple units, whereby one was to be based on the Regio160 platform and the others, including those covered by the option, on the Link platform.

At night in 26–27 September 2024, multiple unit 002 was transported by a car transporter to the Hamburg port, from where it left by sea to the customer. In November, both units supplied by Pesa took part in the ceremonial opening of the Tema–Mpakadan railway line, thereby officially entering revenue service.

=== Deutsche Bahn ===
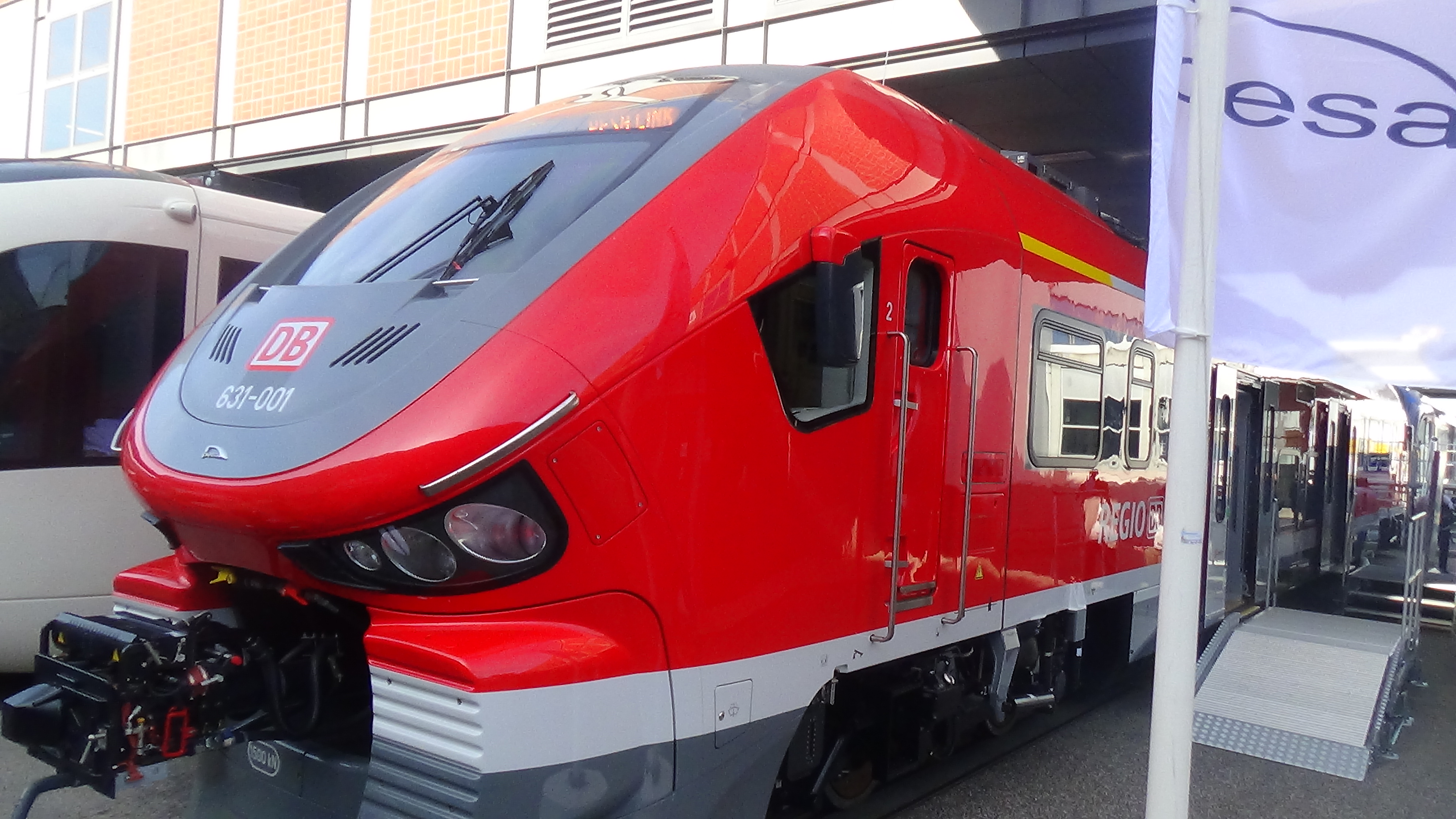
Premiere of the Link I for DB

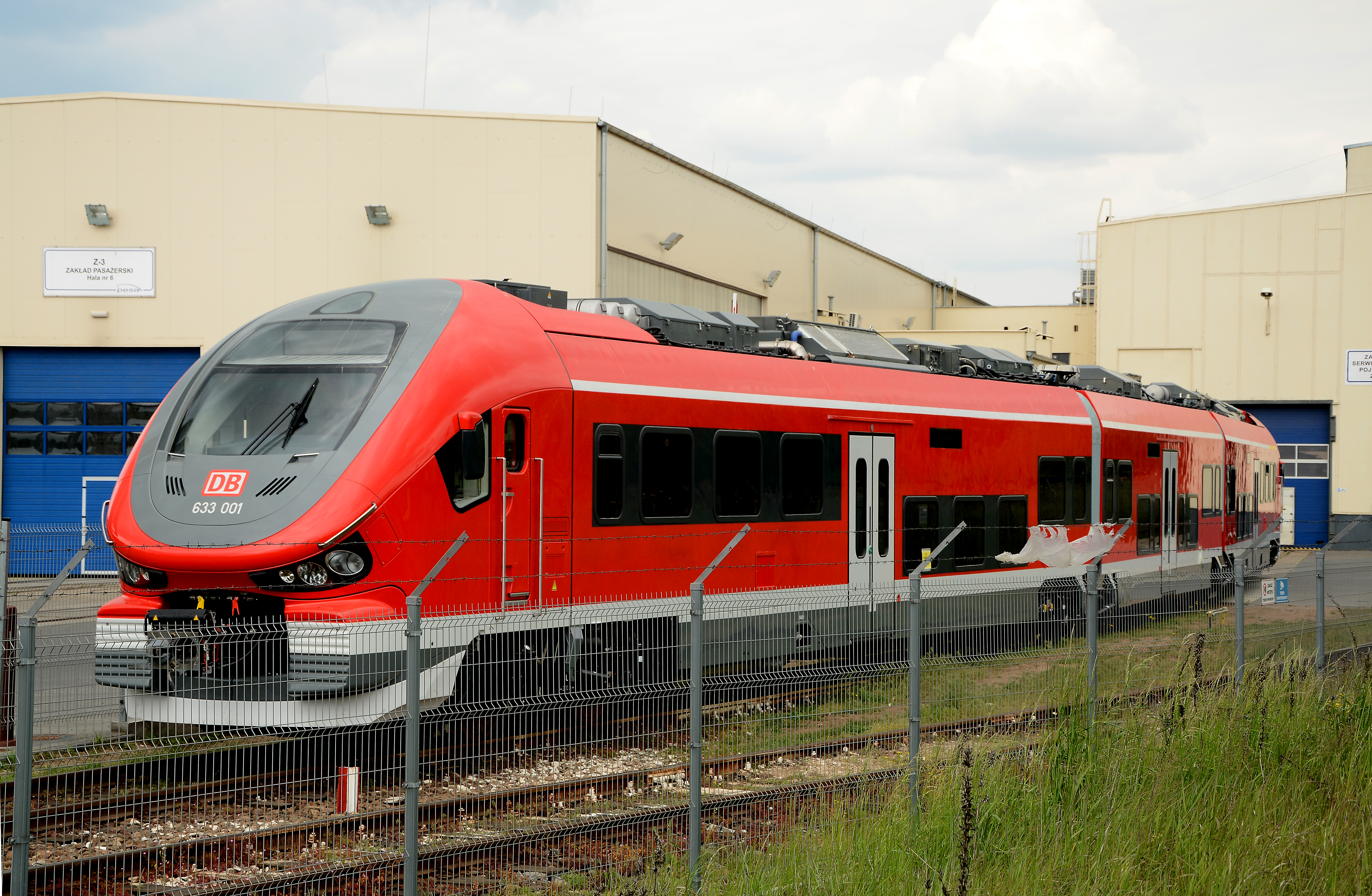
Triple car Link for DB

On 19 September 2012, a framework agreement was signed for the supply of Link multiple units to Deutsche Bahn. Under this agreement, the operator could order up to 470 vehicles by 2018 and contract the manufacturer to maintain them for a period of up to 10 years. Pesa had up to three years to deliver a vehicle from the moment a specific order was placed. The first two units (a single car and a triple car version) were scheduled for delivery by October 2015, accompanied by certification for operation on the German railway network. By July 2013, these multiple units were already in production. The single car Link in DB livery was unveiled at InnoTrans 2014. Production of the triple car prototype was also completed in October.

On 22 November 2013, a contract for 36 Link multiple units was signed following DB's successful bid to operate services in the Sauerland region. The German operator ordered 20 double car and 16 triple car units with a top speed of 120–140 km/h, with operations scheduled to begin in late 2016 (though this date was later pushed back to late 2017). On March 12, 2014, a contract was signed for the delivery of another 9 Link multiple units (2 double car and 7 triple car) to operate services in Hesse. They were scheduled to run on the Dreieich railway (No. 61), connecting Frankfurt am Main and Dieburg, starting 30 December 2016. On 24 September 2014, during the InnoTrans trade fair in Berlin, a contract was signed for the delivery of 26 triple car Link multiple units to operate services in Bavaria. In that state, the Link multiple units were intended to serve the Allgäu region specifically, starting in December 2017.

By the end of July 2018, 6 Link units had been delivered to DB, and by mid-August, 10 had arrived, with some serving passengers in the Dortmund region as part of trial operations. By the end of September, 16 multiple were delivered. In late October, the order was expanded to include one additional double car unit for the Allgäu region. In early November 2018, Deutsche Bahn held an official presentation of the Link multiple units to mark the 75th anniversary of the DB depot in Dortmund. At that time, 20 multiple units were operating on the Emschertal, Volmetal, Ardey, and Hönnetal lines. By the end of 2018, 21 double car units and 4 triple car units were delivered. A presentation of the Link multiple units took place in Frankfurt on 31 January 2019. Negotiations regarding penalties for delivery delays were concluded in February. By April 2019, 42 multiple units were in service (36 in Dortmund and 6 in Frankfurt). Deliveries of triple car Link units for the Allgäu region, which had ordered 26 such vehicles, began on 24 April 2020. Numerous technical issues arose during the initial weeks of service, leading to delays. Consequently, Class 644 diesel multiple units remained in service on the lines at least until August. The multiple units experienced software failures related to the traction control system, causing trains to come to a halt while en route. In July 2019, the operator announced that the persistently low availability of Pesa vehicles had led to a drop in passenger numbers in the Sauerland region. In addition to contractual penalties, the Westphalia-Lippe Local Transport Association is demanding compensation for passengers. Between 2016 and 2018, the association recorded a decline in annual passenger numbers from 3.4 million to 3 million, as well as stagnant revenues. Furthermore, it reported unsatisfactory punctuality and exceptionally poor reliability rates.

On 29 September 2020, the last Link multiple units manufactured for Deutsche Bahn departed from Bydgoszcz. In total, Pesa delivered 72 Link multiple units: 23 are double car units designated by the operator as BR632, while 49 are triple car units designated as BR633.

=== Niederbarnimer Eisenbahn ===
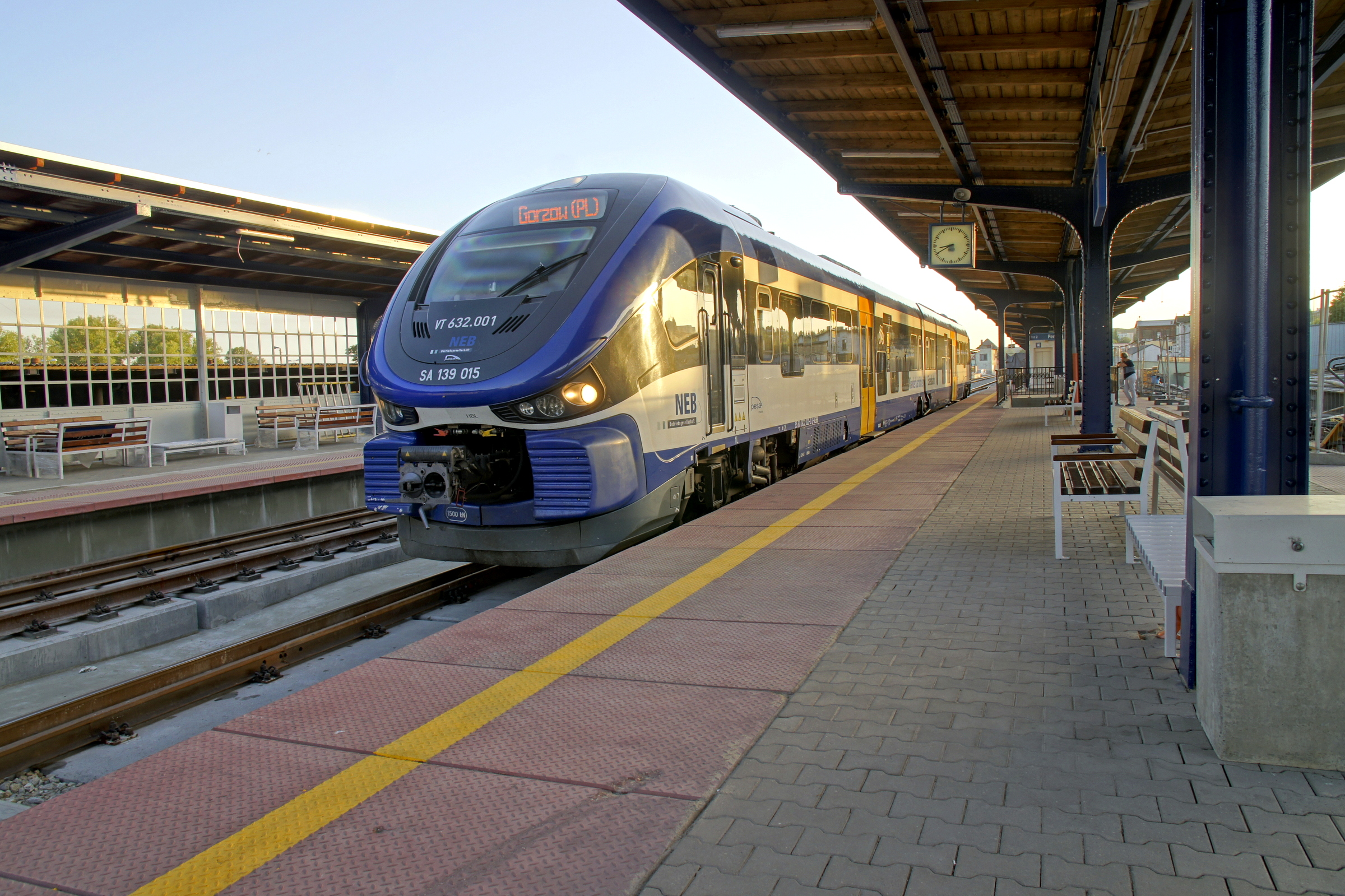
Multiple unit owned by the railway carrier Niederbarnimer Eisenbahn at Gorzów Wielkopolski railway station in 2019

On 24 September 2013, a contract was signed for the delivery of 7 double car and 2 triple car Link multiple units to Niederbarnimer Eisenbahn for services on the routes from Berlin to Templin and Kostrzyn nad Odrą. The multiple units were scheduled for delivery by December 2015. On 19 August 2015, the multiple units reached a top speed of 120 km/h while operating in multiple-unit mode. By mid-April, all 9 multiple units were ready and homologation testing was completed; the process was then awaiting type approval from the Eisenbahn-Bundesamt (Federal Railway Authority), which was granted on June 3. In February 2016, the first two Link multiple units were used to train train drivers and maintenance staff at the operator's depot in Basdorf near Berlin, and on May 19, they underwent preliminary acceptance by NEB. A ceremonial handover of the Link to the German operator took place in Berlin on June 16. The multiple unit then set off on its first promotional run to Potsdam. At that time, 5 of the 7 ordered double car units were already in Germany. Due to the lack of projected date for obtaining certification for the triple car Link multiple units in Germany, the operator modified the remainder of the order to 4 additional double car Link multiple units, which were delivered in 2018.

In July 2016, the multiples operated services from Basdorf to Berlin, Münchberg, Kostrzyn, Küstrin-Kietz, Lichtenberg, Rheinberg, and Löwensberg. In the middle of the month, the multiple units were assigned to the route to Kostrzyn, where they transported attendees of the Przystanek Woodstock festival. On 11 December 2016, coinciding with the introduction of a new timetable, the Link multiple units began operating the Berlin-Lichtenberg – Gorzów Wielkopolski route. The service is co-financed by the Polish side.

In late April, it emerged that the operator had refused to accept delivery of 4 multiple units due to software issues. Managing Director Detlef Bröcker criticized the manufacturer's attitude toward the matter and threatened legal action. The operator decided against placing further orders for multiple units from the Bydgoszcz plant.

=== Regentalbahn ===
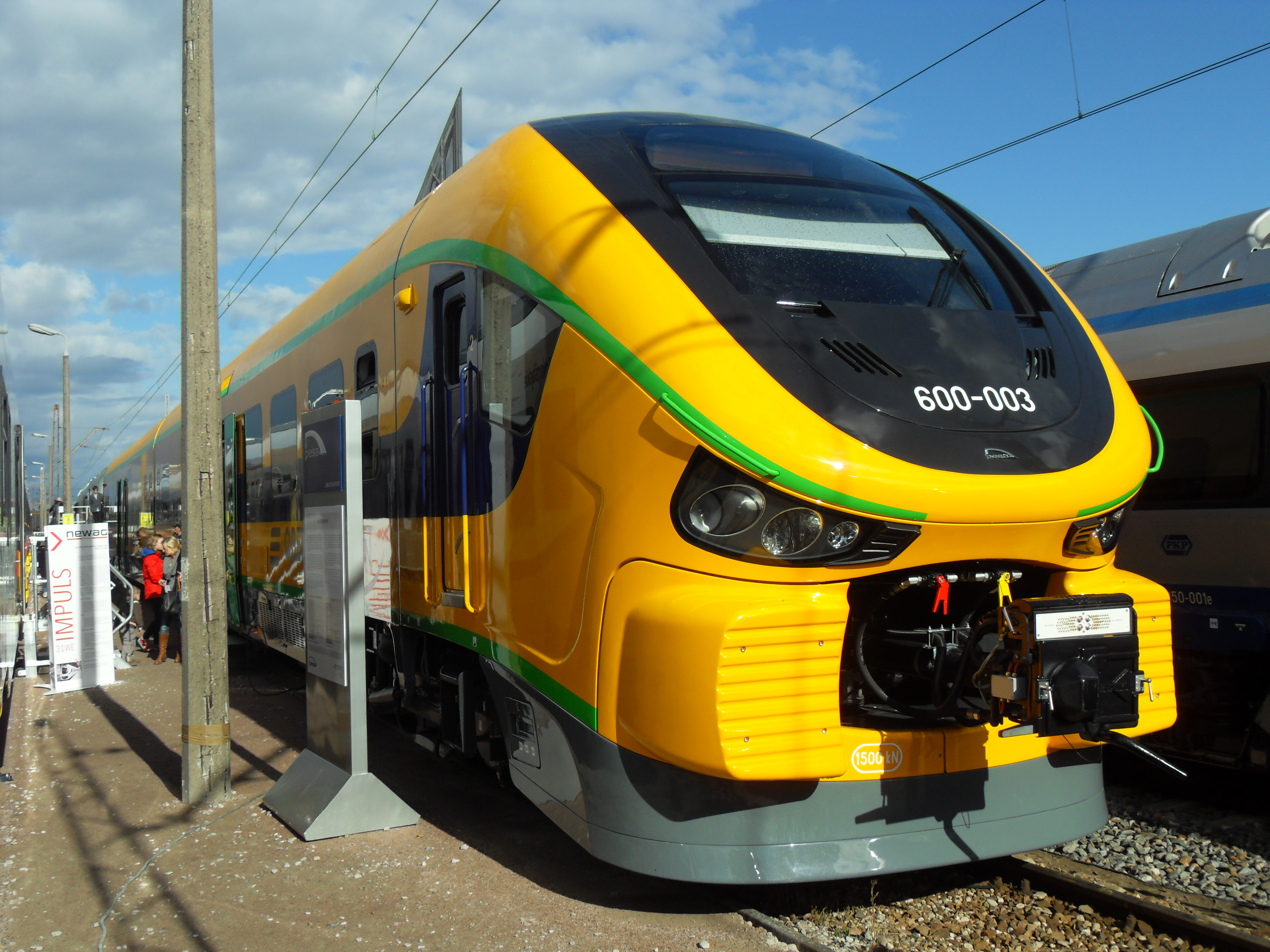
Pesa Link in Oberpfalzbahn livery at InnoTrans in 2012

On 20 December 2011, the German operator Regentalbahn (part of the Netinera Group) ordered 12 double car Link multiple units. The delivery of the first multiple units was scheduled on 9 June 2014. From December 2014, the Link units were intended to operate the Regensburg – Marktredwitz – Schirnding route.

The manufacturer failed to deliver the ordered vehicles on time due to the lack of required authorization for railway operation in Germany. On 14 December 2014, Oberpfalzbahn began operating new routes (for which it had ordered the Link units) using substitute rolling stock: Siemens Desiro and Stadler Regio-Shuttle multiple units. Ultimately, the operator cancelled the order with Pesa and announced on 25 February 2015 that to avoid further delays in introducing brand-new rolling stock, it had ordered Alstom Coradia Lint 41 multiple units, scheduled for delivery between March and June 2016.

=== Polregio (Lubusz) ===
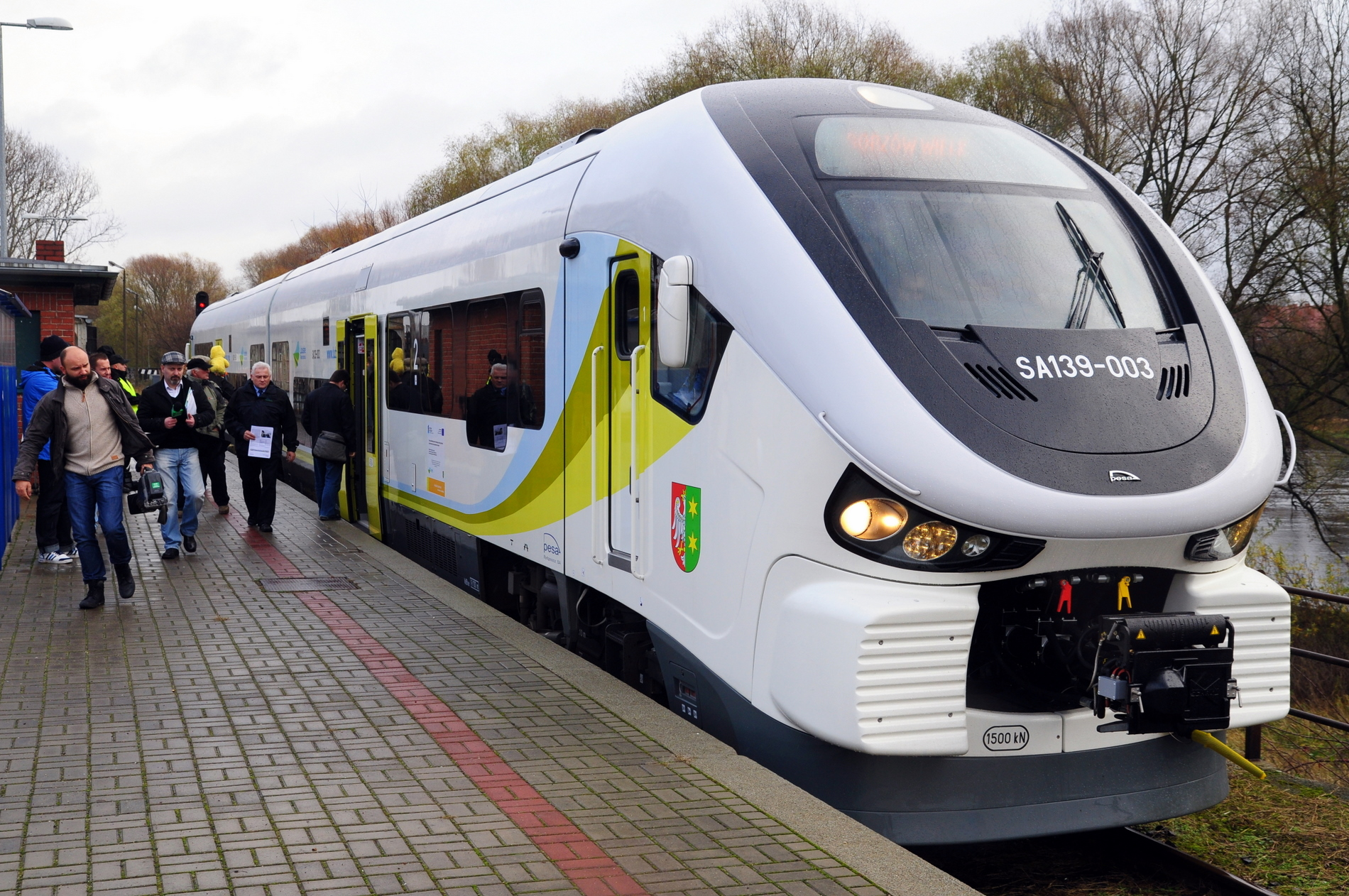
Class SA139-003 of the Lubusz branch of Polregio, during its test runs

On 15 March 2013, a contract was signed in Zielona Góra for the delivery of 4 double car Link multiple units to Polregio by 13 December 2013. The contract stipulated that the Link units would obtain homologation for the German railway network by December 2015.

The first multiple unit arrived on October 31, and the inaugural run on the Zielona Góra – Gorzów Wielkopolski route took place on November 24, marking the launch of a direct rail connection between the two provincial capitals. Two of the ordered Link units were designated to serve this connection, while the other two were assigned to the Kostrzyn – Krzyż route (pending German type approval). Following that period, one of the multiple units was scheduled to operate the Krzyż – Gorzów Wielkopolski – Kostrzyn – Berlin route, and the other the Zielona Góra – Frankfurt (Oder) route.

In late November 2015, Pesa informed the Lubusz regional authorities that obtaining authorization for the SA139 multiple units to operate on the German railway network by the end of 2015 was impossible. Consequently, the launch of direct Gorzów Wielkopolski–Berlin services, originally scheduled for 13 December 2015, could not proceed, and the Lubusz region began levying contractual penalties, which ultimately totaled 19 million PLN. Due to the refusal to pay the penalties, the matter went to court. On 2 October 2017, a court settlement was reached under which the voivodeship was to receive two additional multiple units certified for operation on the German railway network. The multiple units were ready by late September 2019, and the first one was handed over to the ordering party in early October.

=== Polregio (West Pomerania) ===
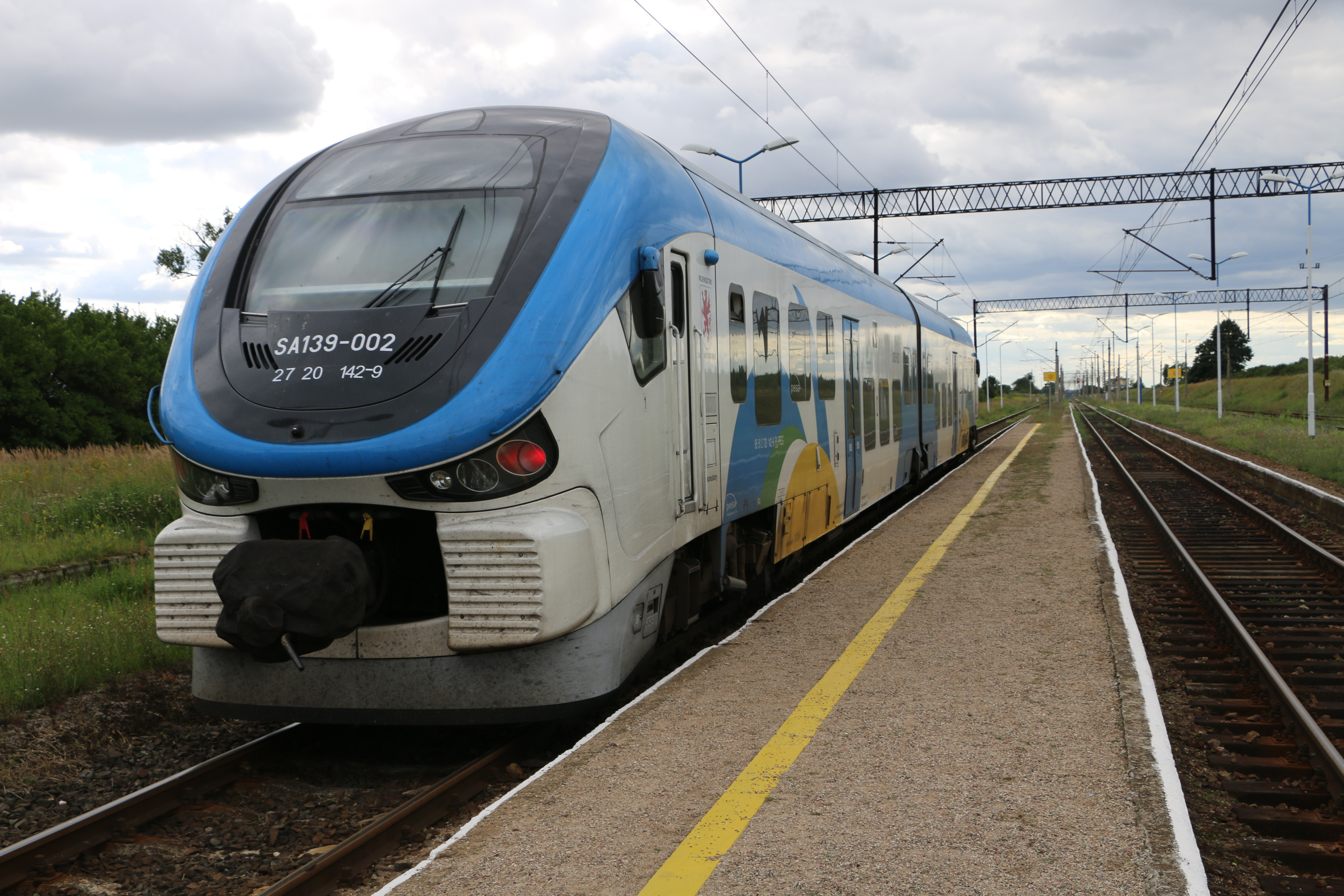
SA139-002 in Ulikowo

On 2 July 2012, a contract was signed for the delivery of 2 double car Link multiple units for the West Pomeranian Voivodeship. The contract stipulated that the Link multiple units obtain homologation for the German railway network by 31 August 2014.

The first multiple was scheduled for delivery by 5 December 2012, and its technical acceptance took place on that very day. In the next day, it was officially unveiled at Szczecin Główny railway station before entering service on the Szczecin–Kołobrzeg route. The second ordered Link multiple unit was meant to arrive in the West Pomeranian region by 5 December 2013. However, it was delivered ahead of schedule; on August 8, ceremonies similar to the previous ones were held, again concluding with a trip to Kołobrzeg, though this time involving both Link multiple units coupled together.

The deadline for the manufacturer to obtain type approval for the multiple units for the German railway network expired on 31 August 2014, but it failed to do so. Consequently, Pesa paid the applicable financial penalty.

On 12 August 2021, both multiple units were put up for sale by the Marshal's Office of the West Pomeranian Voivodeship, alongside SA109-001. Both Link multiple units, as well as the Regiovan, were acquired by Polregio.

=== Greater Poland Railways ===
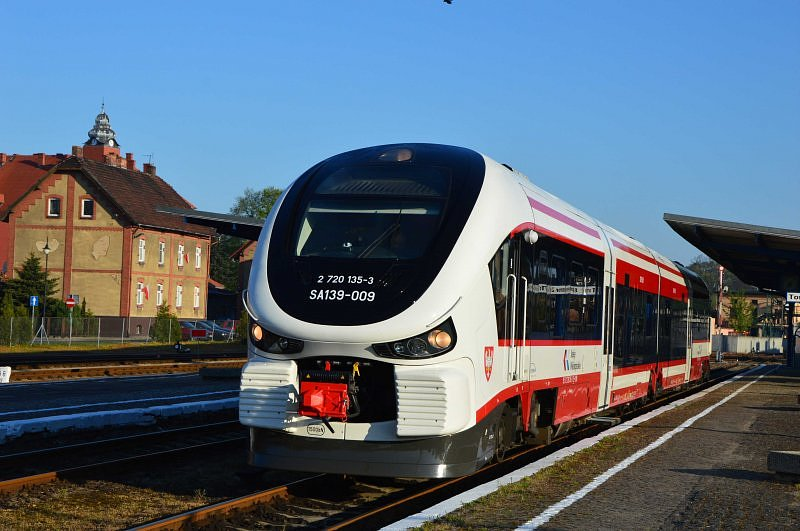
SA139-009 in Wolsztyn

In December 2014, Greater Poland Railways announced a tender for the supply and lease of four double car diesel multiple units intended for service on the Poznań Główny – Gołańcz route. The tender specifications included a requirement for the trains to be certified for operation on the Deutsche Bahn network. Pesa Rental won the tender with a bid offering four double car Link multiple units. Under the agreement, the Link multiple units were to operate in the Greater Poland Railways livery from 18 to 24 months, with an option for Greater Poland Railways to purchase the multiple units later. The contract for this order was signed on February 9. Pesa delivered the first 3 multiple units to the regional operator in the first half of March 2015, and they entered service on March 31. On August 26, the last mulriple unit of the class (SA139-010) joined the operator's fleet. The operator received multiple units that were meant to be delivered for Regentalbahn.

At the end of the lease period, the Voivodeship decided not to purchase the multiple units, instead it announced a tender for a four-month lease of three diesel multiple units, which was won by Pesa Rental with an offer to lease Link multiple units. The contract was signed on 15 March 2017.

On 13 October 2017, the Marshal's Office of the Greater Poland Voivodeship signed a contract with Pesa for the delivery of two double car diesel multiple units manufactured after 1 January 2015. By the second half of December, both ordered multiple units were already in the fleet of Greater Poland Railways, and they were the same units the operator had previously used.

On 4 August 2021, the Marshal's Office of the Greater Poland Voivodeship announced a tender for the purchase of a used diesel multiple unit; Pesa submitted a bid offering the used SA139-008, a multiple unit that previously operated on Greater Poland's railway lines. The multiple unit entered service with Greater Poland Railways in January 2022.

=== Lower Silesian Railways ===
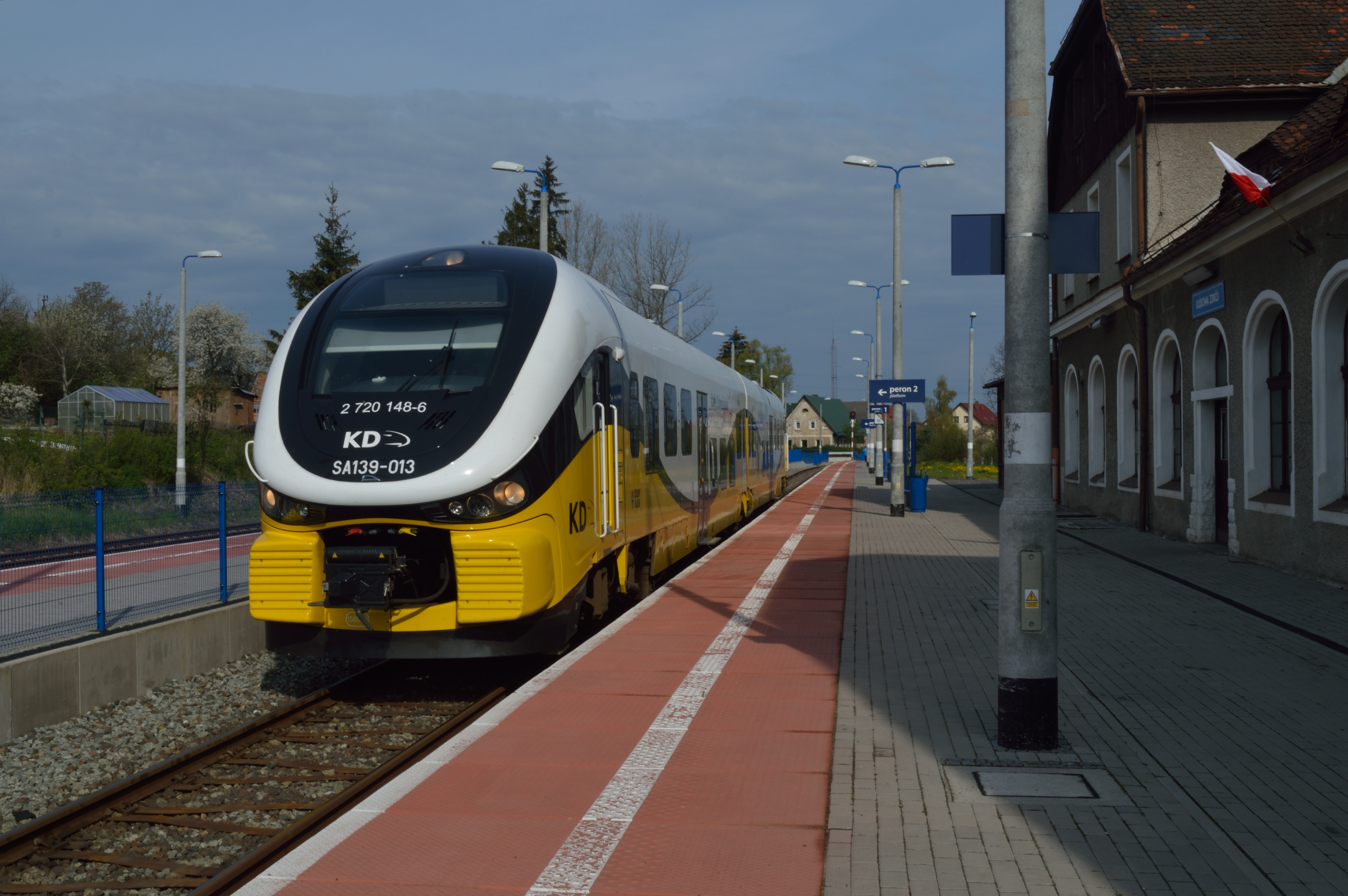
SA139-013 in Kudowa-Zdrój

On 7 September 2015, Lower Silesian Railways purchased four 223M type multiple units, which were delivered on 25 and 26 October. The operator received multiple units originally built for Regentabahn.

On 22 November, one of the multiple units was unveiled in Legnica during the Lower Silesian Railways open day.

In early October 2017, due to a shortage of rolling stock, the operator leased SA139-010 multiple unit from Pesa, which had previously been leased by Greater Poland Railways.

On 8 October 2019, Lower Silesian Railways leased SA139-008 multiple unit from the manufacturer for a period of 123 days.

=== Polregio ===
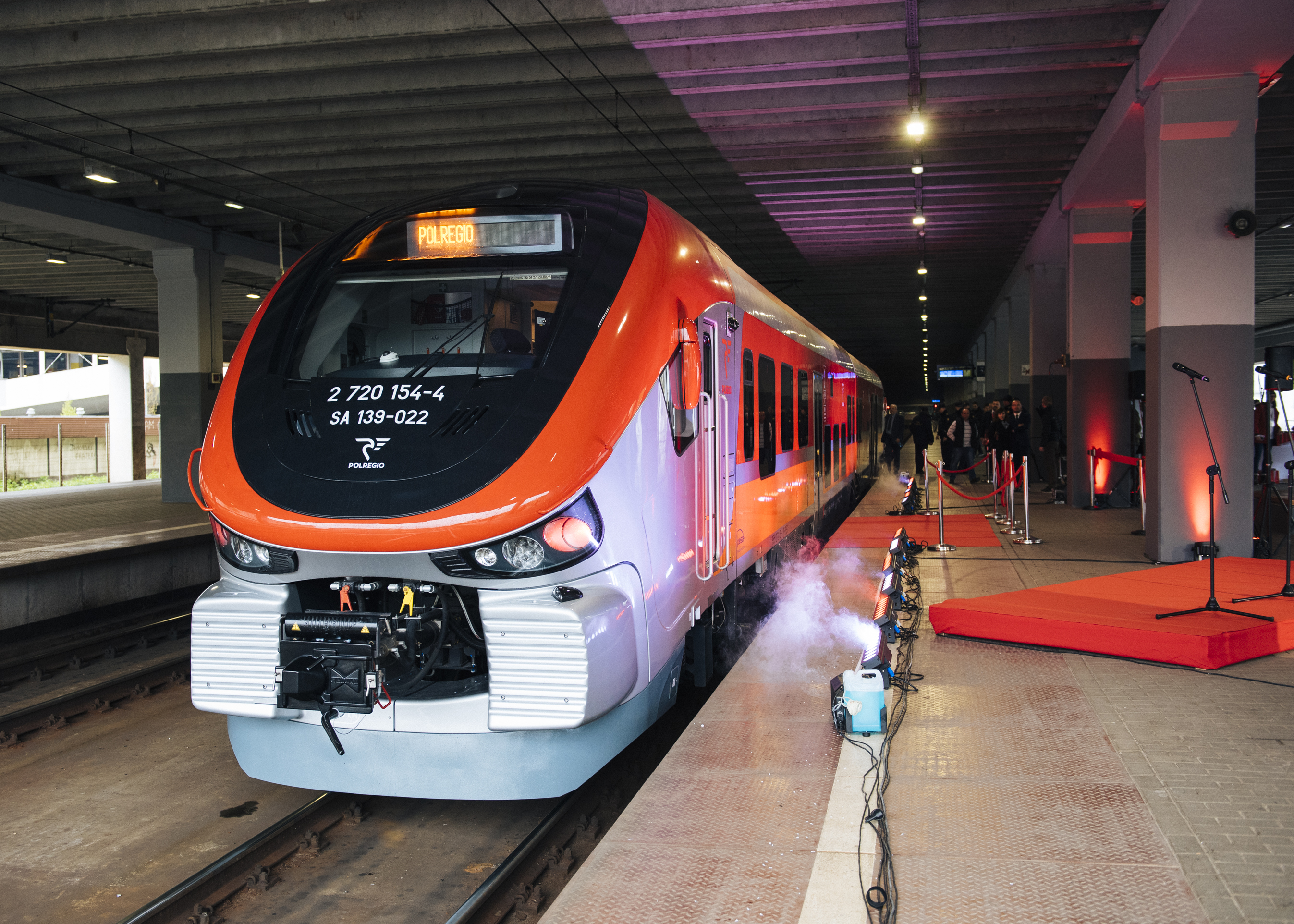
SA139-022 during presentation

At the end of February 2017, Polregio signed a contract with Pesa for the delivery of 3 double car Link multiple units, with an option to extend the order by additional two multiple units. On 27 April, the presentation and handover of the first multiple unit took place at Warszawa Wileńska railway station. The multiple unit then travelled to Chojnice, where the second multiple unit had also arrived in the meantime. In mid-May, the third multiple unit was delivered and all three multiple units were tested. It was announced that these multiple units would replace ZNTK Poznań 207M multiple units built in the 1990s. A presentation took place on 29 May at Gdańsk Wrzeszcz railway station, on 1 June at Olsztyn Główny railway station, and on 22 June at Łódź Kaliska railway station (during which the fifth and last multiple unit was handed over). Once the deliveries were done, 3 multiple units were allocated to the Pomeranian Voivodeship, whilst the remaining individual multiple units entered service in the Warmian-Masurian and Łódź Voivodeships.

At the end of September 2018, Przewozy Regionalne leased another Link multiple unit from Pesa, which was deployed to operate services in the West Pomeranian Voivodeship. On 19 February 2020, Polregio purchased the multiple unit outright. In late May, it was transported to the rolling stock depot in Chojnice. In November 2021, Polregio purchased the first two SA139s ever produced from the West Pomeranian Voivodeship.

== Accidents and incidents ==
=== Poland ===
- On 10 July 2014, SA139-002 operating as R88723 from Kołobrzeg to Szczecin Główny collided with a Scania truck. The multiple unit was damaged and was unable to continue its journey. The railway line was blocked and a TLK train was stranded.
- On 5 November 2014, SA139-005 collided with a Paver in Motylewo and derailed, leaving 4 people injured. The multiple unit had to be sent for emergency repairs.

=== Outside Poland ===
- On 7 July 2020, ČD Class 844 unit 844 005 was involved in a head-on collision at Pernink. Two people were killed and 24 were injured.
- On 4 August 2021, ČD Class 844 unit 844 006 was involved in a head-on collision at Milavče that killed three people.
- On 22 November 2025, ČD Class 844 unit 844 018 derailed after it was diverted to a dead-end track and overran the buffer stops at Johanngeorgenstadt. No injuries were reported.
