= Gorzów Wielkopolski Wieprzyce railway station =

Railway station in Gorzów Wielkopolski, Poland

Coordinates: 52.7178°N 15.1807°E

Gorzów Wielkopolski Wieprzyce
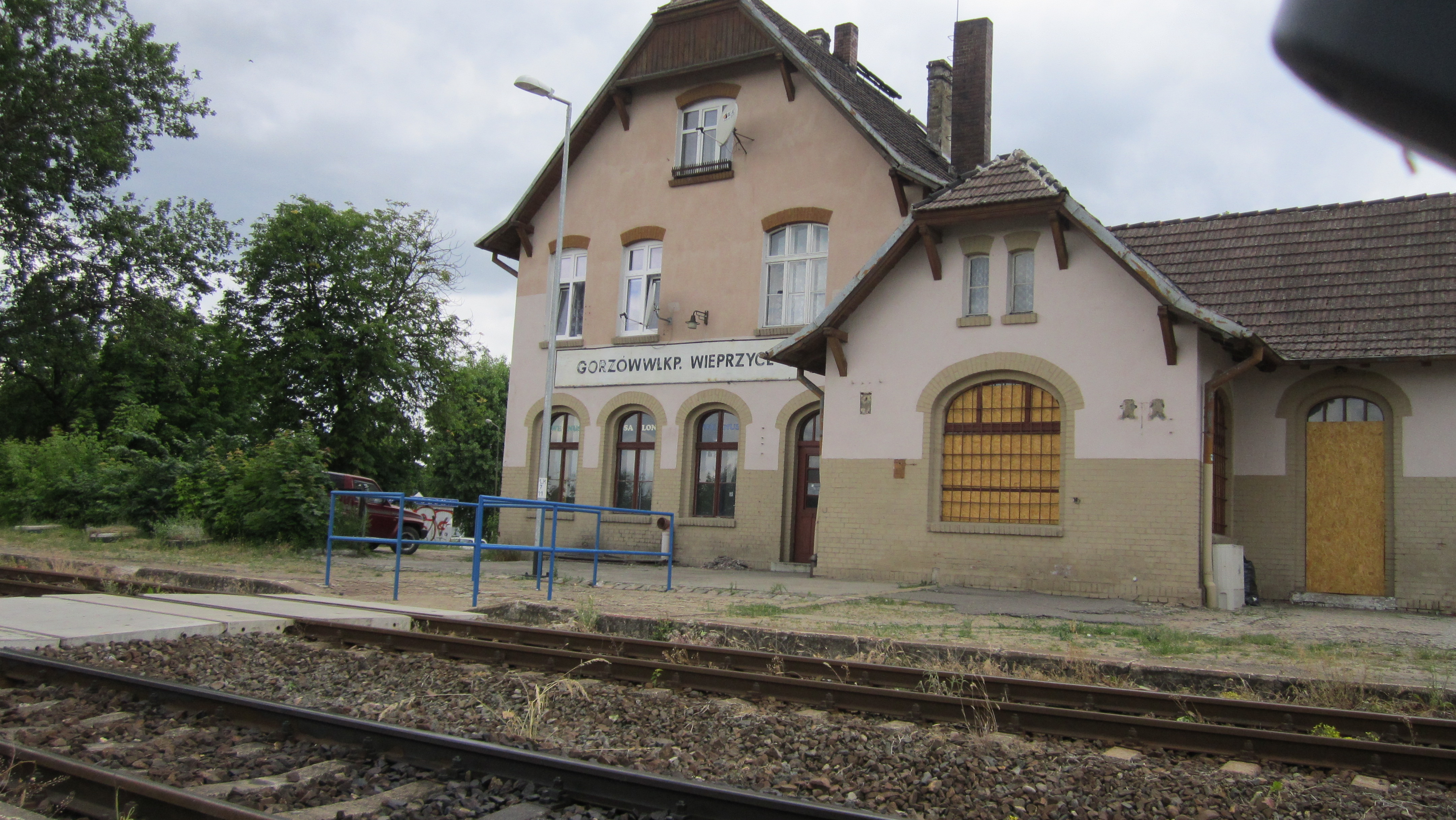
- Gorzów Wielkopolski Wieprzyce railway station

General information
- Location: Gorzów Wielkopolski, Lubusz Voivodeship; Poland
- System: Railway Station
- Operator: Polregio; Arriva
- Lines: 203: Tczew–Kostrzyn railway 415: Gorzów Wielkopolski–Myślibórz railway
- Platforms: 2

History
- Opened: 1912; 114 years ago
- Former names: Wepritz
Location
- Location within Poland

Gorzów Wielkopolski Wieprzyce railway station is a railway station serving the town of Gorzów Wielkopolski, in the Lubusz Voivodeship, Poland. The station opened in 1912 and is located on the Tczew–Kostrzyn railway and Gorzów Wielkopolski–Myślibórz railway. The train services are operated by Polregio and Arriva.

== Train services ==
The station is served by the following service(s):

- Regional services (R) Kostrzyn - Gorzow Wielkopolski - Krzyz (- Poznan)

Preceding station	Polregio	Following station
Łupowo towards Kostrzyn	PR	Gorzów Wielkopolski towards Poznań Główny
