= Gorzów Wielkopolski railway viaduct =

Railway flyover in Gorzów Wielkopolski
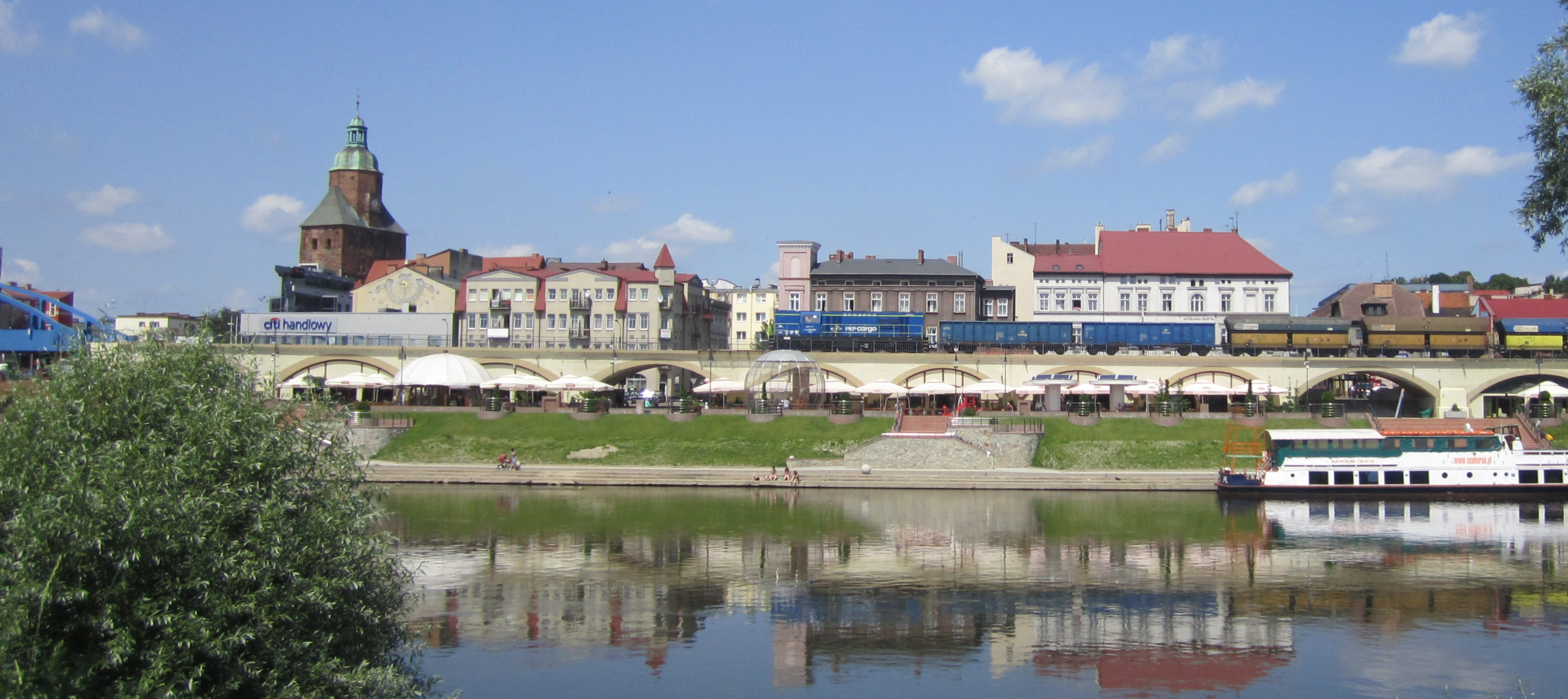
- Coordinates: 52°43′45″N 15°14′20″E

Characteristics
- Total length: 2,116 metres (6,942 ft)

History
- Construction start: 1910
- Construction end: 1914
- Opened: 15 October 1914

Location
- Interactive map of Railway flyover in Gorzów Wielkopolski

The Railway viaduct in Gorzów Wielkopolski is a historic viaduct carrying the railway line No. 203 Kostrzyn–Tczew over the Warta river in Gorzów Wielkopolski in western Poland, in Lubusz Voivodeship. This viaduct is the longest monument of technology in Poland.

== History ==
In the years 1856–1859 a single-track line of Royal-Prussian Eastern Railway was constructed, connecting Berlin and Konigsberg. In the years 1905–1914 two-track line was built, which led within the city by 1300 m long flyover.

== Specification railway overpass ==
The construction has about 70 vaults of parabolic-shaped arches, separated by steel viaducts. The vaults are supported by reinforced concrete pillars and are facet with brick or plaster. Architectural decoration is rusticated for some pillars and cornices of block for others.

== Uniqueness ==
The entire longest one in Poland and is a unique monument of technology with over regional historical values of architectural space.
