= Witnica railway station =

Railway station in Witnica, Poland

Coordinates: 52.6675°N 14.8963°E

Witnica
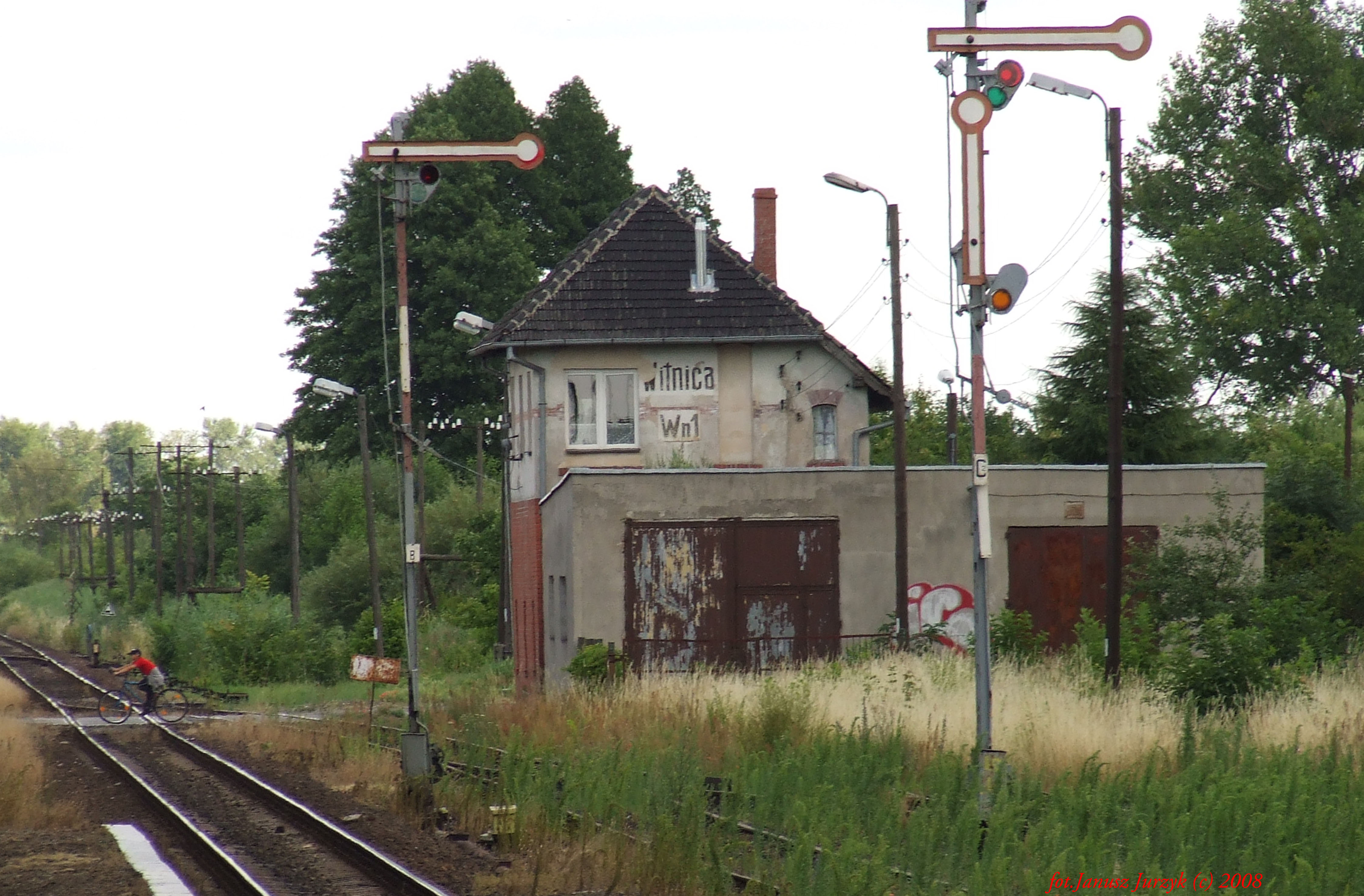
- Witnica railway station

General information
- Location: Witnica, Lubusz Voivodeship; Poland
- System: Railway Station
- Operator: Polregio; Arriva
- Line: 203: Tczew–Kostrzyn railway
- Platforms: 2
- Tracks: 3

History
- Opened: 1857; 169 years ago
- Former names: Vietz 1857-1935, 1938-45; Vietz (Ostbahn) 1936-37; Witnica n/Wartą 1945-46

Services
Preceding station	PKP Intercity	Following station
Gorzów Wielkopolski towards Gdynia Główna	TLK	Kostrzyn Terminus
Preceding station	Polregio	Following station
Kamień Mały towards Kostrzyn	PR	Nowiny Wielkie towards Poznań Główny
Location
- Location within Poland

Witnica railway station is a railway station serving the town of Witnica, in the Lubusz Voivodeship, Poland. The station is located on the Tczew–Kostrzyn railway. The train services are operated by Polregio and Arriva.

== Train services ==
The station is served by the following service(s):

- Intercity services (TLK) Gdynia Główna — Kostrzyn
- Regional services (R) Kostrzyn - Gorzow Wielkopolski - Krzyz (- Poznan)
