= H. Cegielski – Poznań =

Manufacturing firm based in Poznań, Poland

H. Cegielski – Poznań S.A.

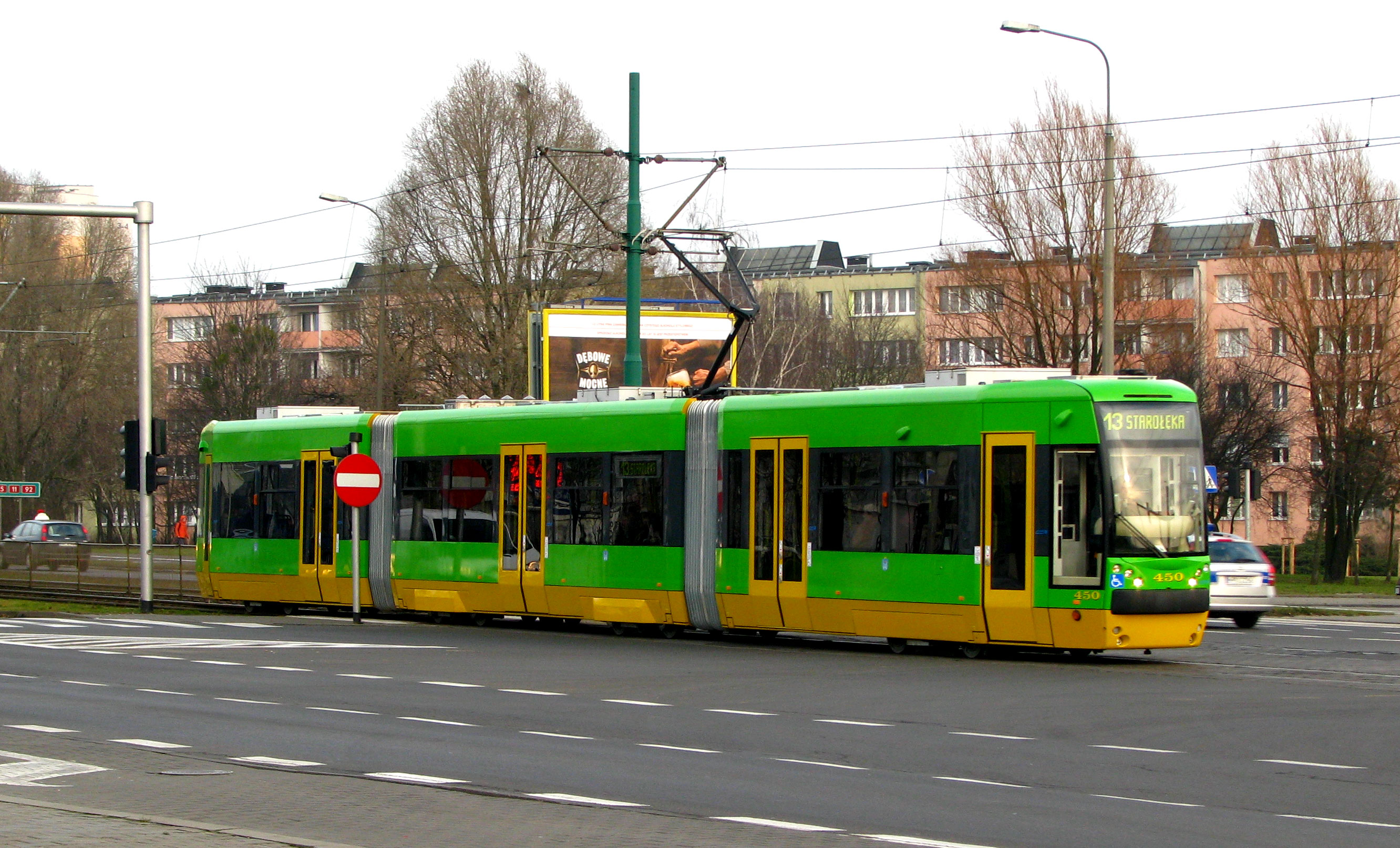
- FPS 118N PUMA tram of HCP-FPS Poznań
- Type: Joint stock company
- Industry: Rail transport
- Founded: 1846; 180 years ago
- Area served: Worldwide
- Website: www.hcp.eu

H. Cegielski – Poznań S.A., known locally as Ceglorz is a Polish manufacturing company based in the city of Poznań. The company is locally known as Ceglorz, and since 1923 has also used the HCP symbol. After the fall of communism, Cegielski became a joint stock company. Currently it has several international certificates (ISO 9001, ISO 14001). In 1994 it received a Golden Medal during the Poznań International Fair.

HCP is part of Polska Grupa Zbrojeniowa SA.

== History ==
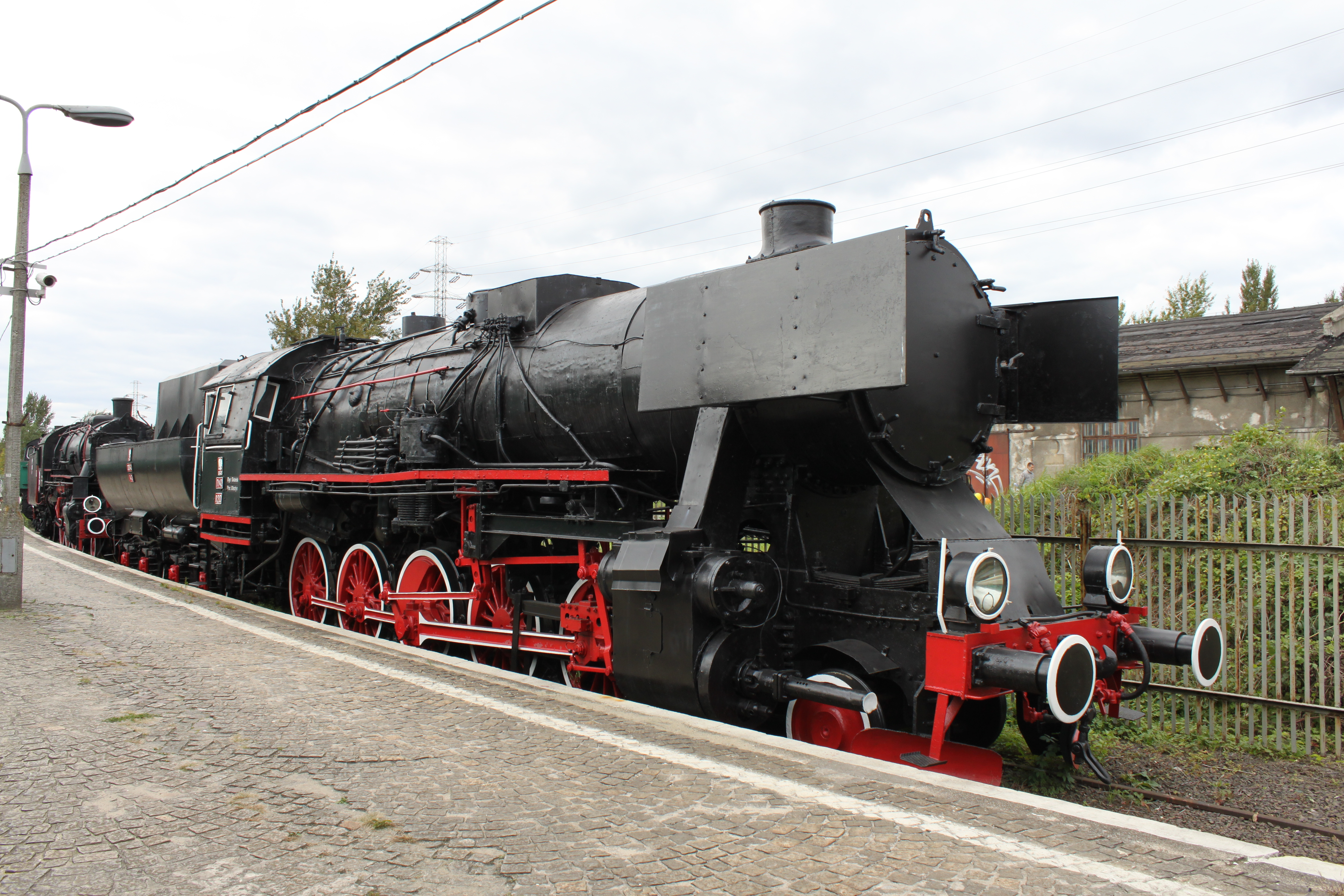
Cegielski locomotive Ty42 at the Railway Museum, Warsaw

The company was founded by Hipolit Cegielski in 1846 in Poznań. It grew from a small workshop in the Hotel Bazar to a large factory, first fixing and later building agricultural mechanical tools and vehicles, steam tractors, steam locomotives and railroad cars, trams and military equipment. In 1869 the company was already producing its own steam engines and had over 300 workers.

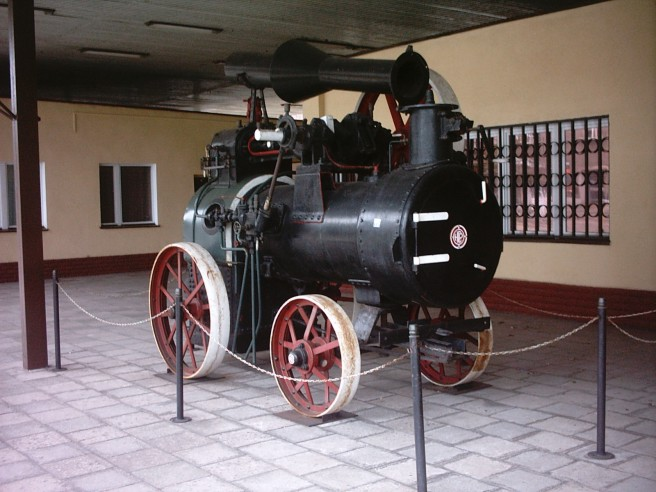
Portable engine once produced in Cegielski factories.

In 1880 Hipolit's son, Stefan Cegielski, renamed the company to "Factory of Agricultural Machines and Equipment H. Cegielski in Poznań" (Fabryka Machin i Urządzeń Rolniczych H. Cegielski w Poznaniu). In 1889 it was transformed from a family business into a privately held company and the name changed to "H. Cegielski Stock Company in Poznań" (H. Cegielski Towarzystwo Akcyjne w Poznaniu). The company was constantly growing, employing 490 people in 1917, 990 in 1920 and over 5000 in 1923, although the Great Depression forced it to downsize and slow production. In the late 1930s the company also branched into producing military equipment (artillery guns and anti-aircraft search lights).

During the Second World War the company was confiscated and turned over to Deutsche Waffen und Munitionsfabriken and Cegielski's factories were used to produce various equipment for the German war machine.

=== After World War II ===
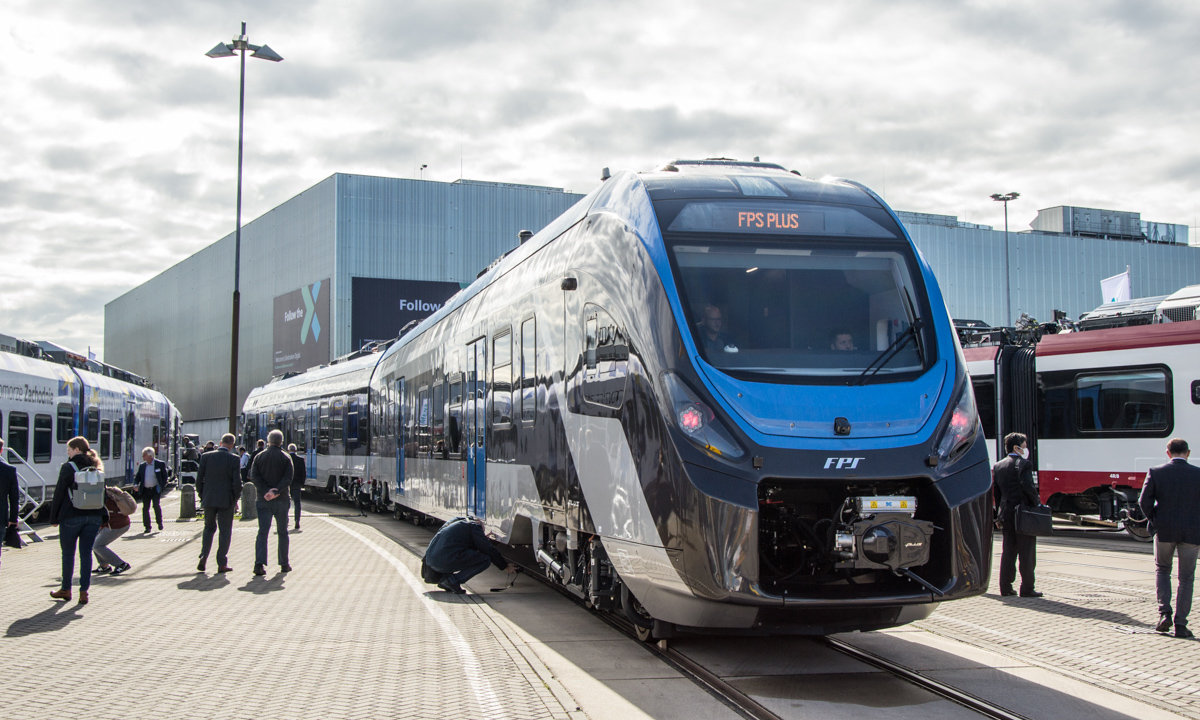
FPS Plus

In 1953, the government of the People's Republic of Poland renamed the company to the "Joseph Stalin Metal Works in Poznań" (Zakłady Metalowe im. Józefa Stalina w Poznaniu, ZISPO). In 1956, a strike action which began at Cegielski's factory and several other major factories in Poznań led to the first of massive protests against the communist government, known as the Poznań 1956 protests. After the protests and the resulting political thaw, the company regained its original name.

In the 1950s the company also stopped producing steam engines, instead acquiring Western licences for marine engines, e.g. for Sulzer diesel engines as used in the MS Mikhail Lermontov.

After the fall of communism, Cegielski became a joint stock company. Currently it has several international certificates (ISO 9001, ISO 14001). In 1994 it received a Golden Medal during the Poznań International Fair.

== Notable projects ==
=== HCP PKM-NATO ===
Poland was a member of the Warsaw Pact when it dissolved in 1991. In the early 1990s, as part of their preparations to join NATO, the Polish armed forces began looking for a replacement for the PK-series machineguns they had in service. Cegielski proposed a prototype (code-named PKM-NATO) that modified the PK/PKS to feed standard 7.62×51mm NATO cartridges and use NATO-standard ammo belts. The modifications included a heavier barrel, a larger chamber, and a redesign of the lock, extractor, and the entire feeding mechanism. The prototype was tested from 1997 to 1999, but was eventually rejected. Instead, the Polish Army adopted the UKM-2000 machine gun - which was also based on the PK.

== Bibliography ==
- "Dzieje Poznania" tom 2 cz. 1 i 2; ed. Jerzy Topolski and Lech Trzeciakowski, PWN, Warszawa-Poznań 1994 i 1998
- "Kronika miasta Poznania", "Wilda, dzielnica Poznania 1253-1939", Magdalena Mrugalska - Banaszak, Wydawnictwo Miejskie, Poznań 1999
- "Wielkopolski Słownik Biograficzny" wyd. II, ed. Antoni Gąsiorowski and Jerzy Topolski, PWN, Warszawa-Poznań 1983
