= Gorzów Wielkopolski railway station =

Railway station in Gorzów Wielkopolski, Poland

Coordinates: 52.7278°N 15.2292°E

Gorzów Wielkopolski
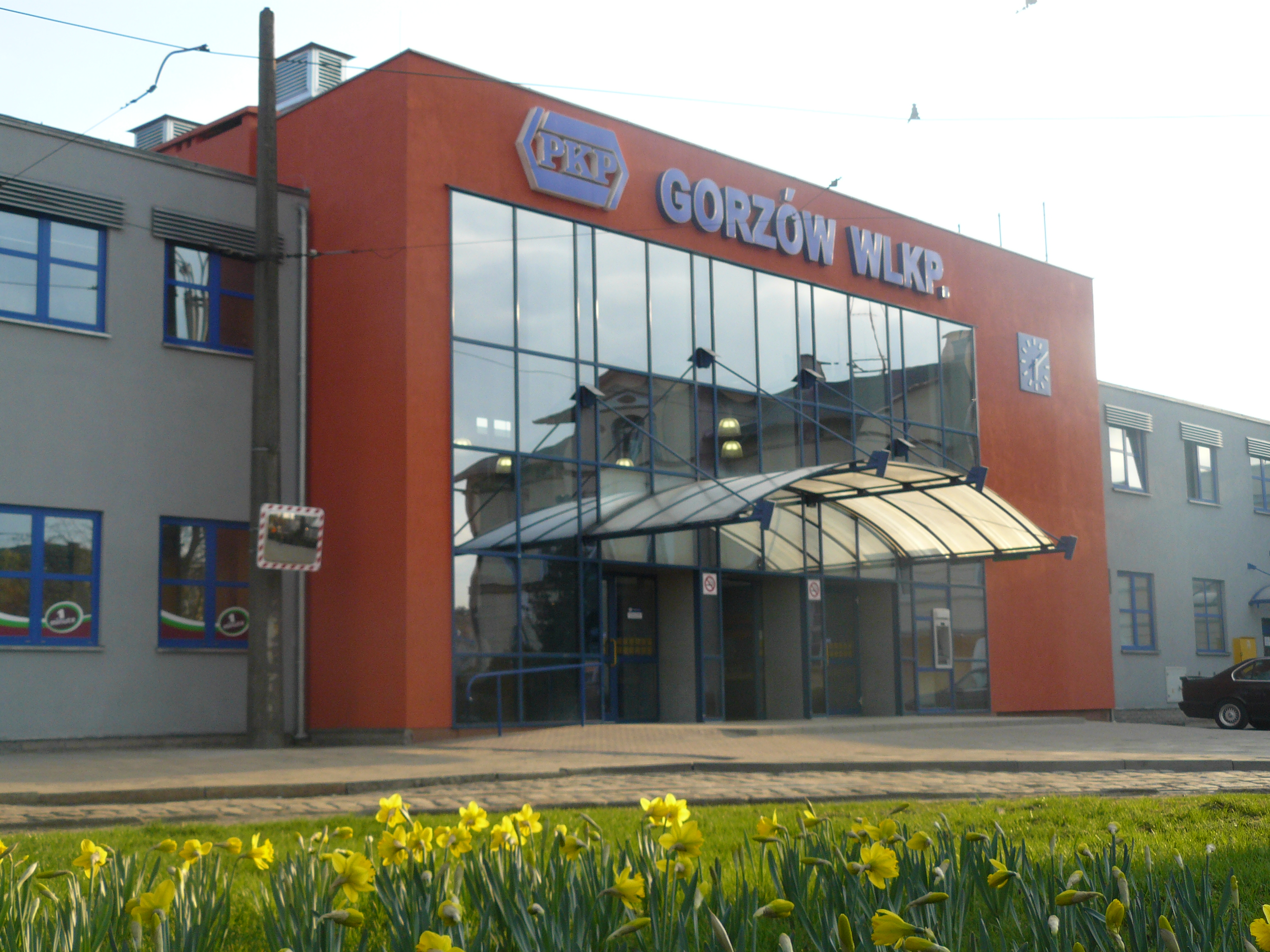
- Gorzów Wielkopolski railway station

General information
- Location: Gorzów Wielkopolski, Lubusz Voivodeship; Poland
- System: Railway Station
- Operator: PKP Polskie Linie Kolejowe
- Lines: 203: Tczew–Kostrzyn railway 367: Zbąszynek-Gorzów Wielkopolski railway 415: Gorzów Wielkopolski–Myślibórz railway

Construction
- Structure type: Elevated

History
- Opened: 12 October 1857; 168 years ago
- Former names: Landsberg (Warthe); Kobyla Góra
Location
- Location within Poland

Gorzów Wielkopolski railway station is a railway station serving the town of Gorzów Wielkopolski, in the Lubusz Voivodeship, Poland. The station opened on 12 October 1857 and is located on the Tczew–Kostrzyn railway, Zbąszynek-Gorzów Wielkopolski railway and Gorzów Wielkopolski–Myślibórz railway. The train services are operated by PKP Intercity, Polregio

== Train services ==
The station is served by the following service(s):

- Intercity services (IC) Gorzów Wielkopolski (- Zbąszynek) - Poznań Główny - Warsaw - Lublin Główny
- Intercity services (IC) Gorzów Wielkopolski (- Zbąszynek) - Poznań Główny - Warszawa Wschodnia
- Intercity services (IC) Gorzów Wielkopolski - Krzyż - Poznań Główny (- Jarocin)
- Intercity services (TLK) Kostrzyn - Gorzów Wielkopolski - Piła Główna - Gdańsk Główny - Sopot - Gdynia Główna
- Regional services (R) Kostrzyn - Gorzów Wielkopolski - Krzyż (- Poznań Główny)
- Regional services (R) Gorzów Wielkopolski - Zielona Góra Główna

Preceding station	PKP Intercity	Following station
Terminus	IC (via Zbąszynek, Poznań Główny)	Skwierzyna towards Zbąszynek or Lublin Główny
Terminus	IC (via Zbąszynek, Poznań Główny)	Skwierzyna towards Zbąszynek or Warszawa Wschodnia
Terminus	IC (via Krzyż Wielkopolski)	Gorzów Wielkopolski Wschodni towards Poznań Główny or Jarocin
Witnica towards Kostrzyn	TLK	Gorzów Wielkopolski Wschodni towards Gdynia Główna
Preceding station	Polregio	Following station
Gorzów Wielkopolski Wieprzyce towards Kostrzyn	PR	Gorzów Wielkopolski Wschodni towards Krzyż or Poznań Główny
Terminus	PR	Gorzów Wielkopolski Zamoście towards Zielona Góra Główna

== See also ==
- Railway viaduct in Gorzów Wielkopolski
