= Frank Ewert =

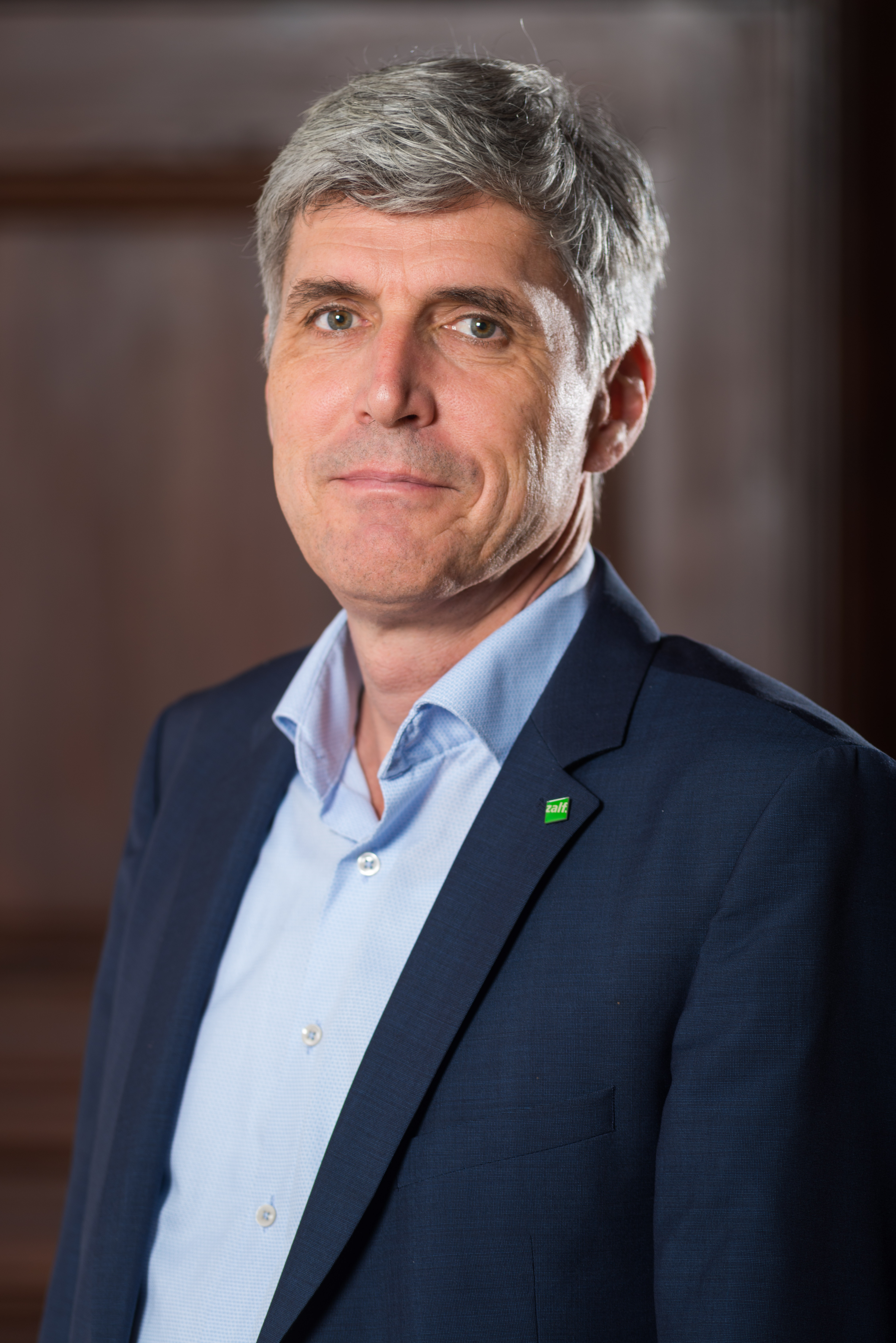
Prof. Frank Ewert (2016)

Frank Ewert (born 1963) is a German agricultural scientist, Scientific Director of the Leibniz Centre for Agricultural Landscape Research (ZALF) and Professor of Crop Production at the University of Bonn.

His areas of expertise include crop science, production ecology, systems analysis, and plant growth modelling. His work focuses on sustainability and impact assessments of the influence of climate change on crop production systems, food security, and resource conservation.

== Professional career ==
Ewert studied agricultural sciences at the University of Rostock (Germany) from 1983 to 1988. From 1988 to 1993 doctoral studies followed at the University of Rostock. He continued his scientific career in 1995 as a research associate at the Long Ashton Research Station of the University of Bristol and the Agricultural and Food Research Council (AFRC) in the UK. From 1995 to 2002, Frank Ewert worked as an Assistant and Associate Research Professor at the Department of Agricultural Sciences, Royal Veterinary and Agricultural University, later at the University of Copenhagen in Denmark. From 2002 to 2008, he was a senior scientist at the Department of Plant Sciences at Wageningen University in the Netherlands.

In 2008, he was called to the University of Bonn, where he has since been Professor of Crop Science at the Institute of Crop Science and Resource Conservation (INRES). There, he also leads the working group on crop production.

Effective March 1, 2016, Frank Ewert took over as Scientific Director at the Leibniz Center for Agricultural Landscape Research (ZALF) in Müncheberg near Berlin. He was granted leave of absence from the University of Bonn to perform this function.

In 2002 and 2012 Frank Ewert received calls from the Technical University of Munich (Professorship of Organic Agriculture) and the University of Reading (Professor of Crop Science), which he did not accept.

== Current memberships ==
- Spokesman of the NFDI4Agri consortium (National Research Data Infrastructure for Agricultural Sciences)
- Member of the Scientific Group of the UN Secretary-General’s 2021 Food Systems Summit
- Chair of the Supervisory Board of Research Programme LIL (Land-Innovation Lausitz)
- Member of the "Research Steering Committee“ for the Federal Ministry of Food and Agriculture
- Member of the International Advisory Board of the PE&RC Graduate School for Production Ecology & Resource Conservation, University of Wageningen
- Co-chair and member of the international organizing committee of the International Crop Modelling Symposium, iCROPM 2016 and iCROPM 2020
- Member of the Steering Group of the DFG Excellence Cluster „PhenoRob“
- Member of the AgMIP Leaders Forum
- Co-chair of the Wheat Initiative's Working Group on Plant Modeling
- Chairman of the consortium council of the program „WIR Land Innovation Lausitz“ (BMBF)
- Member of the editorial board of various journals, a. o. “Field Crops Research”, “European Journal of Agronomy”, “Nature Scientific Reports”, "Socio-Environmental Systems Modeling (SESMO)" and in the past (2002-2015) “Agriculture, Ecosystems and Environment”

== Awards ==
- Research Award for Foreign Specialists, administered by the National Institute of Agro-Environmental Sciences, Japan
- Highly Cited Researcher 2016 (Web of Science)
- Highly Cited Researcher 2017 (Web of Science)
- Highly Cited Researcher 2018 (Web of Science)
- Highly Cited Researcher 2019 (Web of Science)
- Highly Cited Researcher 2020 (Web of Science)
- Highly Cited Researcher 2021 (Web of Science)
- Highly Cited Researcher 2022 (Web of Science)

== Publications ==
- Publications at ZALF
- Publications by Frank Ewert on Google Scholar
- Frank Ewert on ResearchGate
