= Paganetti =

Paganetti is an Italian surname. Notable people with the surname include:

- Allison Paganetti (born 1984), Miss Rhode Island USA 2005
- Gustav Paganetti-Hummler (1871–1949), Austrian naturalist and entomologist
- T. J. Paganetti (born 1989), American football coach
- Vittoria Paganetti (born 2006), Italian tennis player

== See also ==
- 16110 Paganetti, an asteroid
