= Mordellistena stoeckleini =

Scientific classification
- Domain: Eukaryota
- Kingdom: Animalia
- Phylum: Arthropoda
- Class: Insecta
- Order: Coleoptera
- Suborder: Polyphaga
- Infraorder: Cucujiformia
- Family: Mordellidae
- Genus: Mordellistena
- Species: M. stoeckleini

Binomial name
- Mordellistena stoeckleini Ermisch, 1956

Species of beetle

Mordellistena stoeckleini is a species of beetle in the genus Mordellistena of the family Mordellidae. It was described by Karl Friedrich Ermisch in 1956.
