= Bleyl =

Bleyl is a surname. Notable people with the surname include:

- Fritz Bleyl (1880–1966), German artist
- Karl Bleyl (1908–1995), German entomologist
- Tommy Bleyl (born 2007), American ice hockey player
