= Mordellistena rayi =

Scientific classification
- Kingdom: Animalia
- Phylum: Arthropoda
- Clade: Pancrustacea
- Class: Insecta
- Order: Coleoptera
- Suborder: Polyphaga
- Infraorder: Cucujiformia
- Family: Mordellidae
- Genus: Mordellistena
- Species: M. rayi

Binomial name
- Mordellistena rayi Ermisch, 1965

Synonyms
- Mordellistena humeralis Ray, 1937 – preoccupied

Species of beetle

Mordellistena rayi is a species of beetle in the family Mordellidae. It was first described as Mordellistena humeralis in 1937 by Eugene Ray from Puerto Rico, but this name was preoccupied by Mordellistena humeralis (Linnaeus, 1758), and the replacement name Mordellistena rayi was created by Karl Ermisch in 1965.

This beetle measures 2.6 mm (0.10 in) in length, or 3.8 mm (0.15 in) when including the anal stylus. The antennae are 0.6 mm (0.024 in) long.
