= Leibniz Centre for Agricultural Landscape Research =

Facility in Müncheberg, Germany

The Leibniz Centre for Agricultural Landscape Research (ZALF)
- Leibniz Centre for Agricultural Landscape Research (ZALF)
- Research type: Basic and Applied Science; disciplinary, interdisciplinary, transdisciplinary and integrated research
- Budget: German Federal Government (50 %), Federal State of Brandenburg (50 %)
- Field of research: Natural Science, Life Science, Social Science, Cultural Science
- Directors: Frank Ewert (scient. director) Martin Jank (admin. director)
- Staff: ca. 418 employees (2022)
- Location: Müncheberg, Germany
- Website: http://www.zalf.de/en

The Leibniz Centre for Agricultural Landscape Research (ZALF) e.V. in Müncheberg is a member institute of the Leibniz Association. ZALF conducts scientific research on the complex interactions within agricultural landscapes in order to provide knowledge for their sustainable use.

== Research ==
ZALF conducts scientific research on causal relationships and interactions in agricultural landscapes and the development of ecologically and economically sustainable land use systems. The institute has about 418 employees (as of July 2022) working in three Research Areas, one Research Platform, an Experimental Infrastructure Platform with a total experimental area of about 150 ha located in Müncheberg, Dedelow and Paulinenaue, as well as administrative and supporting units.

According to its statutes, ZALF conducts scientific research on causal relationships in agricultural landscapes and aims to provide knowledge for their sustainable use. To this end, ZALF covers a wide range of topics from basic to application-oriented research and contributes to public welfare by means of scientific knowledge transfer to relevant target groups in society, politics and the economy.

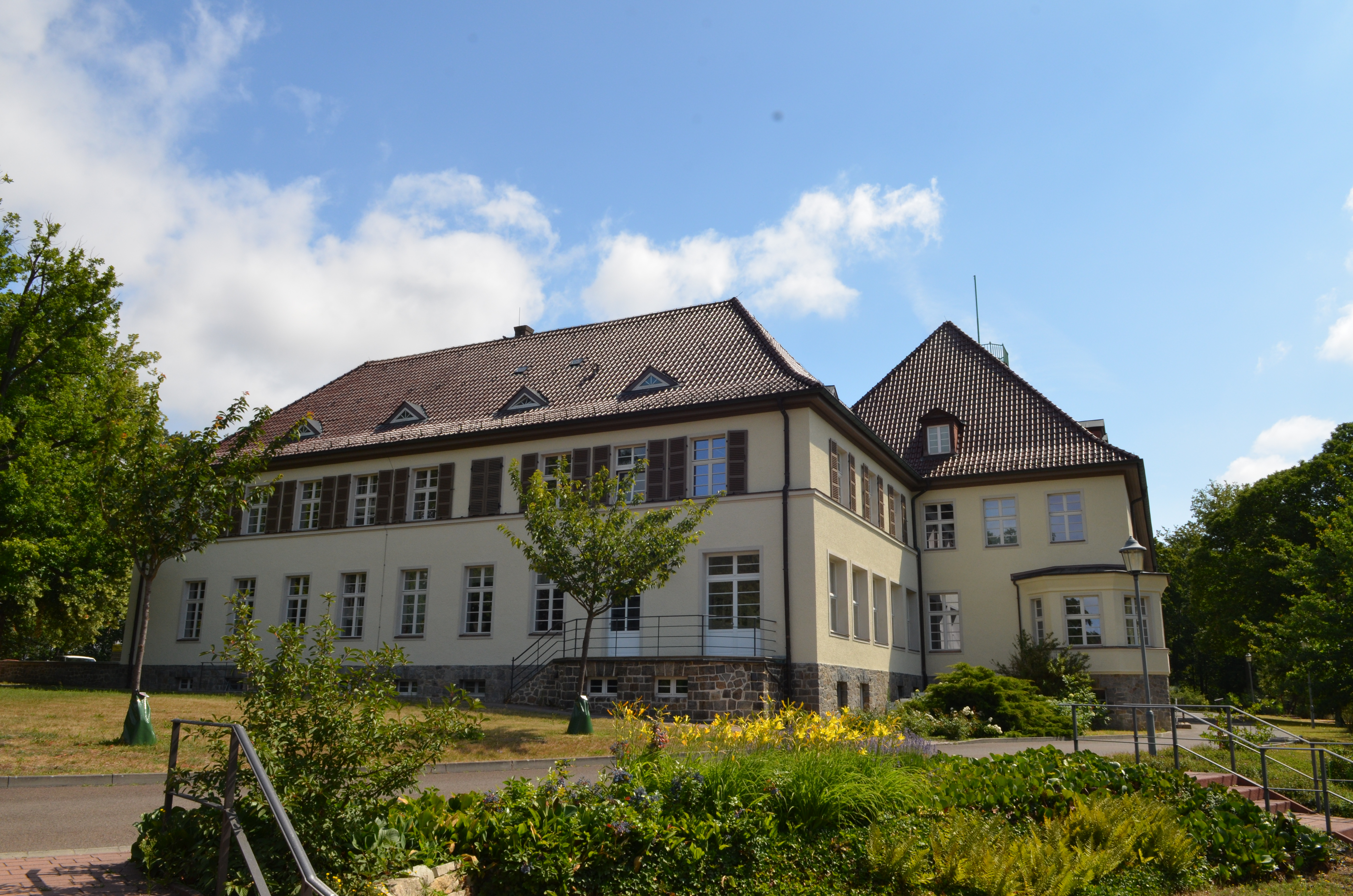
Leibniz Centre for Agricultural Landscape Research (ZALF) e.V., historic main building after renovation in 2019

ZALF addresses its research questions in three interdisciplinary Research Areas, which are closely interlinked via topical and methodological interfaces:

- Landscape Functioning: How do agricultural landscapes function?
- Land Use and Governance: How can we sustainably develop and shape intensively used agricultural landscapes?
- Agricultural Landscape Research: What will the agricultural landscapes of the future look like?

The thematic work in these three Research Areas is supported and linked via the Research Platform "Data Analysis and Simulation". The numerous field- and landscape-related ZALF research infrastructures are bundled in the "Experimental Infrastructure Platform" (EIP).

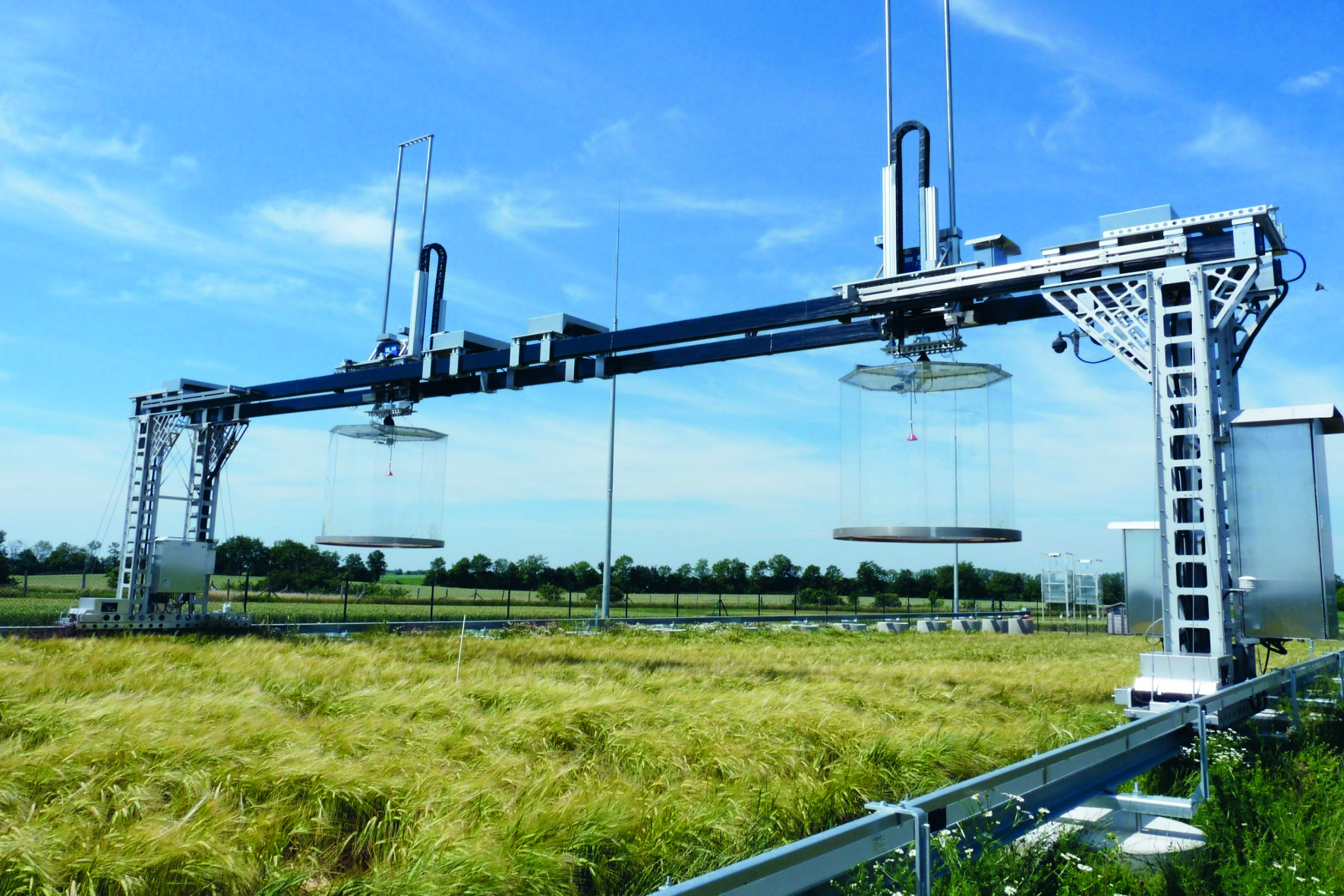
ZALF experimental site at Dedelow with gantry crane for gas flux measurement

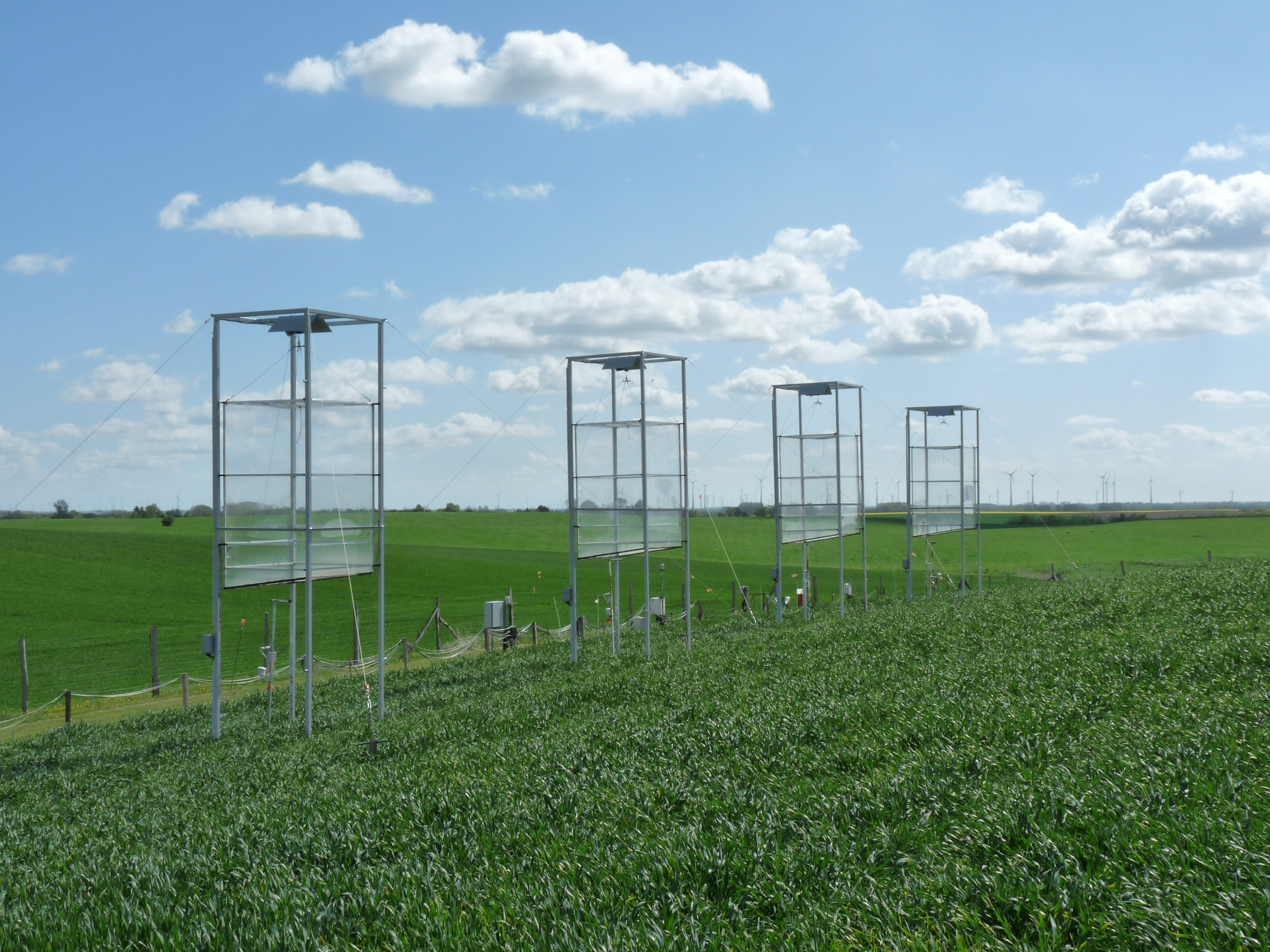
ZALF experimental site at Dedelow with gas measurement chambers

== Structure ==
- Research Area 1 „Landscape Functioning“
- Research Area 2 „Land Use and Governance“
- Research Area 3 „Agricultural Landscape Research
- Research Platform „Data Analysis and Simulation“
- Experimental Infrastructure Platform

Since 2009, the temporarily affiliated German Entomological Institute belongs to the research network of the Senckenberg Research Institute.

== History ==
The stony and sandy soils and the dry regions in eastern Germany led Erwin Baur to found the Kaiser Wilhelm Institute for Plant Breeding Research. in Müncheberg, east of Berlin, in 1928. The primary objective was to breed more resistant and less demanding crops. After the Second World War, the institute was transferred to the Central Research Institute for Arable and Plant Crops and, from 1970, to the Research Centre for Soil Fertility of the Academy of Agricultural Sciences of the GDR.

After the German reunification, ZALF was re-established in 1992 in the legal form of a non-profit, registered association as “Zentrum für Agrarlandschafts- und Landnutzungsforschung e.V.” On the recommendation of the German Council of Science and Humanities (“Wissenschaftsrat”), the institute became part of the so-called Blue List (“Arbeitsgemeinschaft Blaue Liste”; AG-BL), which was later transformed into the Leibniz Association.

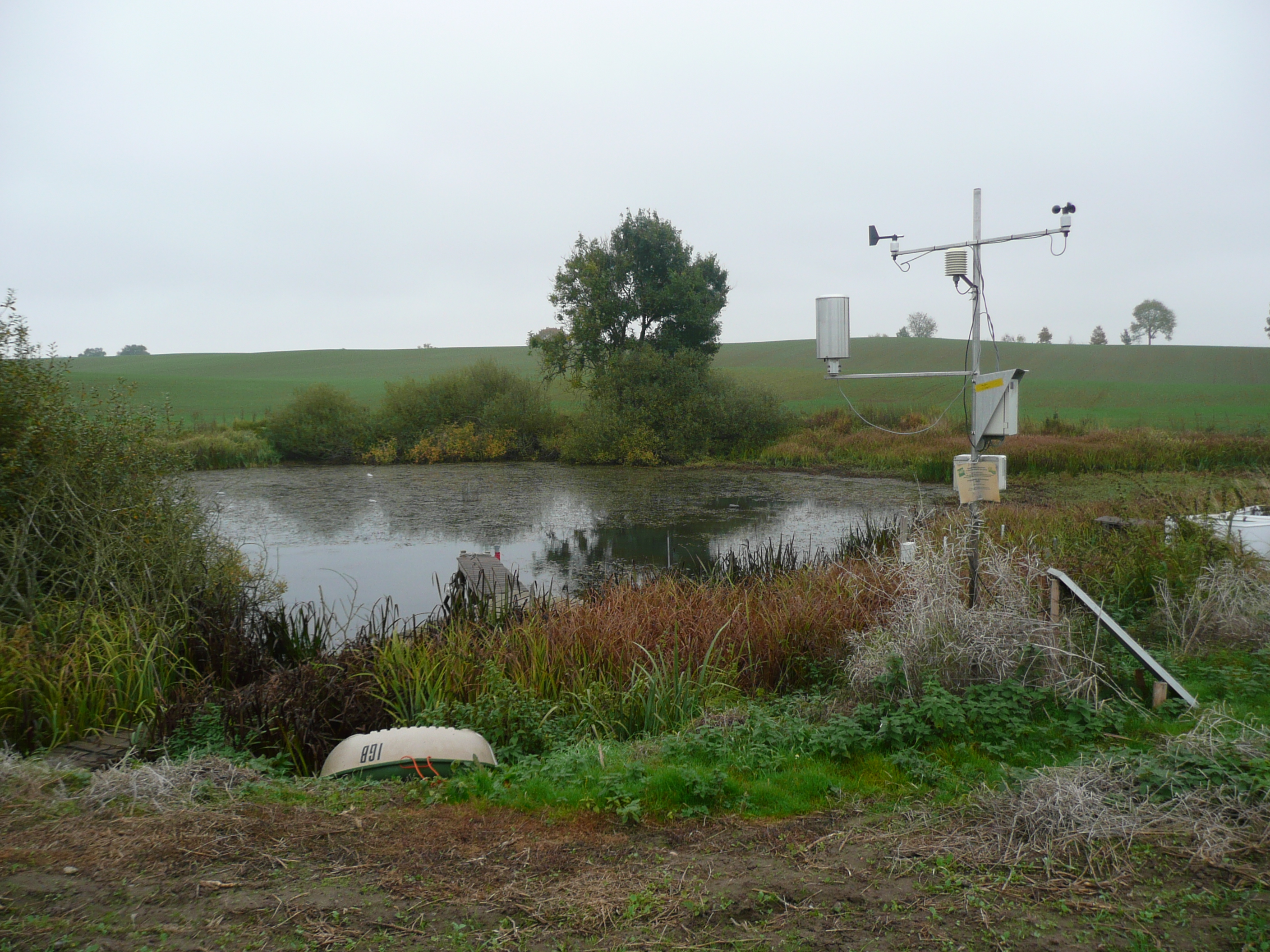
Instrumented kettle hole (small water bodies) in the northern German agricultural landscape

Currently, ZALF is managed by its Executive Board members Prof. Frank A. Ewert (Scientific Director) and Martin Jank (Administrative Director). Basic funding is provided in equal parts by the Brandenburg Ministry of Science, Research and Culture (MWFK) and the Federal Ministry of Food and Agriculture (BMEL).

The ZALF campus in Müncheberg also features an experimental orchard headed by Hilmar Schwärzel, with a collection of 1,000 varieties distributed among 4,000 individual trees. This station has been affiliated with the “Lehr- und Versuchsanstalt für Gartenbau und Arboristik e.V.” (LVGA) in Großbeeren as a new department since July 22, 2019.

On May 2, 1992, the ZALF spin-off Umwelt-Geräte-Technik GmbH (UGT), based in Müncheberg, started its activities. The company founders Manfred Seyfarth and Bernd Fürst and their team started their own business in the field of scientific instrument engineering, including the production of PE-HD lysimeter stations
