= Senckenberg German Entomological Institute =

German research institute

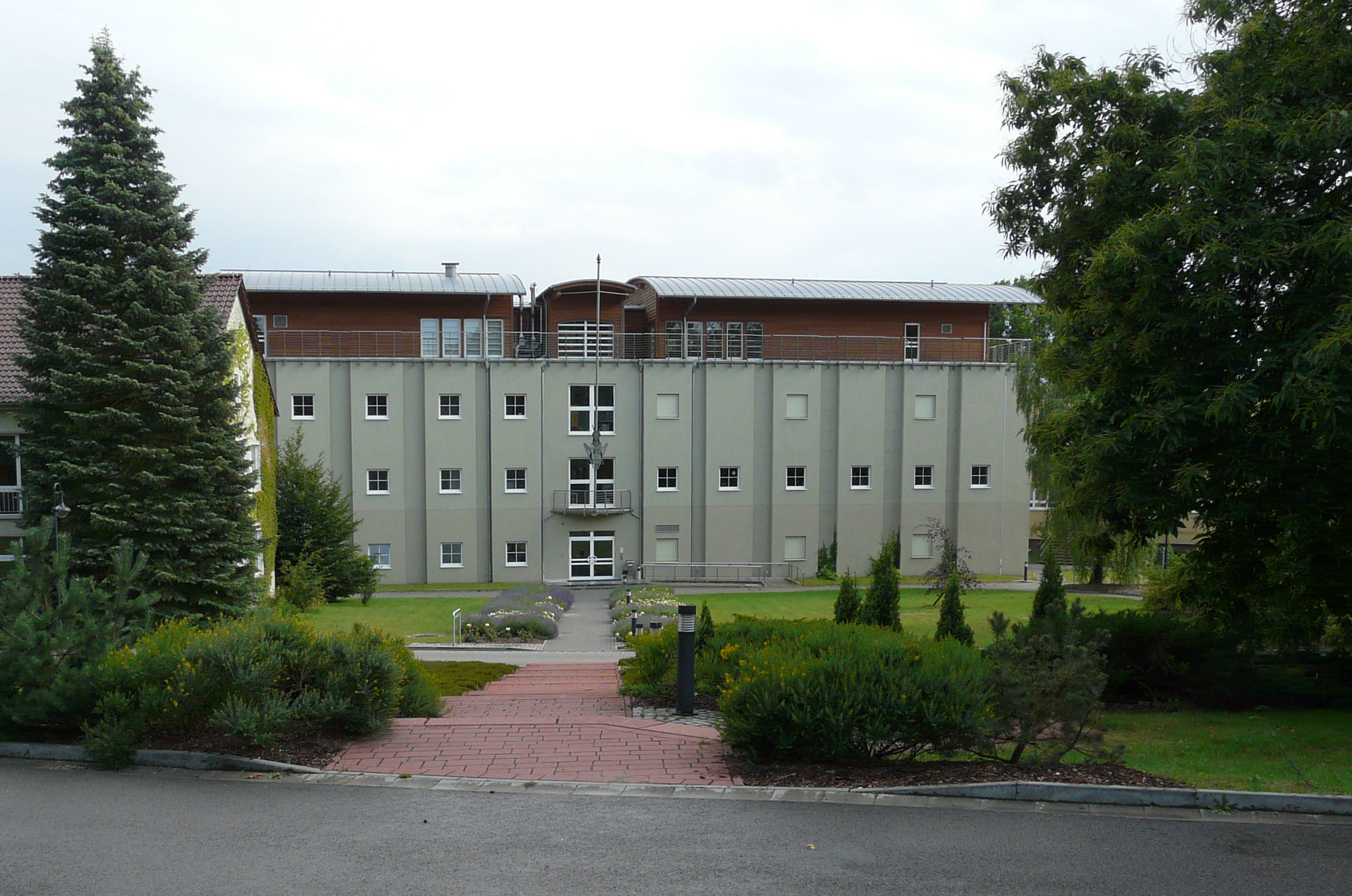
Senckenberg German Entomological Institute in Müncheberg, a small town in Märkisch-Oderland

The Senckenberg German Entomological Institute (German: Senckenberg Deutsches Entomologisches Institut; SDEI or DEI) is a German entomological research institute devoted to the study of insects. Founded in 1886, the institute has an extraordinary insect collection and a world-class entomological library. Since 2009, the SDEI has been part of the Senckenberg Nature Research Society.

== Insect collections ==
The department of Phylogenetic Systematics and Taxonomy of Insects maintains about 3 million pinned insects and uncounted specimens in the wet collection, among others the collections of:

- Rudolf von Bennigsen (1824-1902)
- Karl Bleyl (1908-1995)
- Carl Julius Bernhard Börner (1880-1953)
- Peter Friedrich Bouché (1784-1856)
- Gustav Breddin (1864-1909)
- Adolf Willy Lothar Dieckmann (1920-1990)
- Karl Friedrich Ermisch (1898-1970)
- Karl Flach (1856-1920)
- Gerrit Friese (1931-1990)
- Johann Georg Haag-Rutenberg (1830-1880)
- Lucas Friedrich Julius Dominikus von Heyden (1838-1915)
- Walther Hermann Richard Horn (1871-1939)
- Carl Friedrich Ketel (1861-1906)
- Hermann Kläger (1847-1923)
- Hermann Albert Friedrich Köller (1885-1968)
- Wilhelm Koltze (1839-1914)
- Ernst Gustav Kraatz (1831-1909)
- Friedrich Wilhelm Konow (1842-1908)
- Karl Friedrich Lange (1844-1913)
- Otto Leonhard (1853-1929)
- Karl Wilhelm Letzner (1812-1889)
- Bernhardt Lichtwardt (1857-1943)
- Walter Liebmann (1885-1974)
- Gustav Adolf Lohse (1910-1994)
- Axel Leonard Melander (1878-1962)
- Julius Melzer (1878-1934)
- Wilhelm Mink (1807-1883)
- Karl-Heinz Mohr (1925-1989)
- Julius Neresheimer (1880-1943)
- Heinrich von Oettingen (1878-1956)
- Lorenz Oldenberg (1863-1931)
- Carl Robert Osten-Sacken (1828-1906)
- Gustav Paganetti-Hummler (1871-1949)
- Paul Pape (1859-1933)
- Helmuth Patzak (1927-1988)
- Ernst Pietsch (1872-1930)
- Karl Ritter (1909-1998)
- William Henry Rolph (1847-1883)
- Arthur Leopold Albert Maria Rottenberg (1843-1875)
- Max Saalmüller (1832-1890)
- Johann Christian Rudolf Sachse (1802-1891)
- Hans Sauter (1871-1948)
- Ludwig Wilhelm Schaufuss (1833-1890)
- Karl Gotthilf Schenkling (1835-1911)
- Sigmund Schenkling (1865-1946)

== Entomological Information Center ==
The Entomology Information Center keeps:

- 24,000 monographies, anthologies
- 48,000 volumes of periodicals of about 2.400 journals and series (titles), among them 850 current serial journals
- 118,000 separata
- 1,500 further media (maps, films, CDs, CD-ROMs, DVDs, VHS)

The archives are also associated here, which comprise:

- 120 bequests of entomologists
- A collection of 6,000 portraits including photographs, engravings, prints, and press clippings of entomologists
- A collection of objects related to entomology, such as postcards, small figurines, or costume jewellery

== See also ==
- Entomological Society of Stettin
