= Karl Bleyl =

German entomologist

Karl Bleyl (4 December 1908 – 28 April 1995) was an amateur German entomologist who specialised in Hymenoptera. His collection of Hymenoptera (Apoidea) is held by the German Entomological Institute. His Lepidoptera are in the collection of Thomas Lehmann in Oranienbaum.

Bleyl was born on Gut Seeben near Halle, Germany. He began collecting insects at the age of 6. Bleyl was influenced by entomologist and Hymenoptera researcher Ernst Heidenreich. He died in Oranienbaum, Germany on 28 April 1995.
