= Gustav Paganetti-Hummler =

Austrian naturalist and entomologist

Gustav Paganetti-Hummler (20 December 1871 – January 1949, Bad Vöslau) was an Austrian naturalist and entomologist.

Gustav Paganetti-Hummler was a bookseller mainly of natural history works and natural history specimen dealer. He had a large insect collection mainly of specimens from South Europe. As well as other works, he wrote an account of the Hemiptera of the Greek island Corfu (Beitrag zur Hemipterenfauna zu Corfu. Zeitschrift für Wissenschaftliche Insektenbiologie 1907:92-95. His collection is in the Vienna Natural History Museum (parts in the German Entomological Institute) It is important since it contains insects from South of Vienna wetland habitats near Bad Vöslau which no longer exist.
