= Müncheberg =

- Town
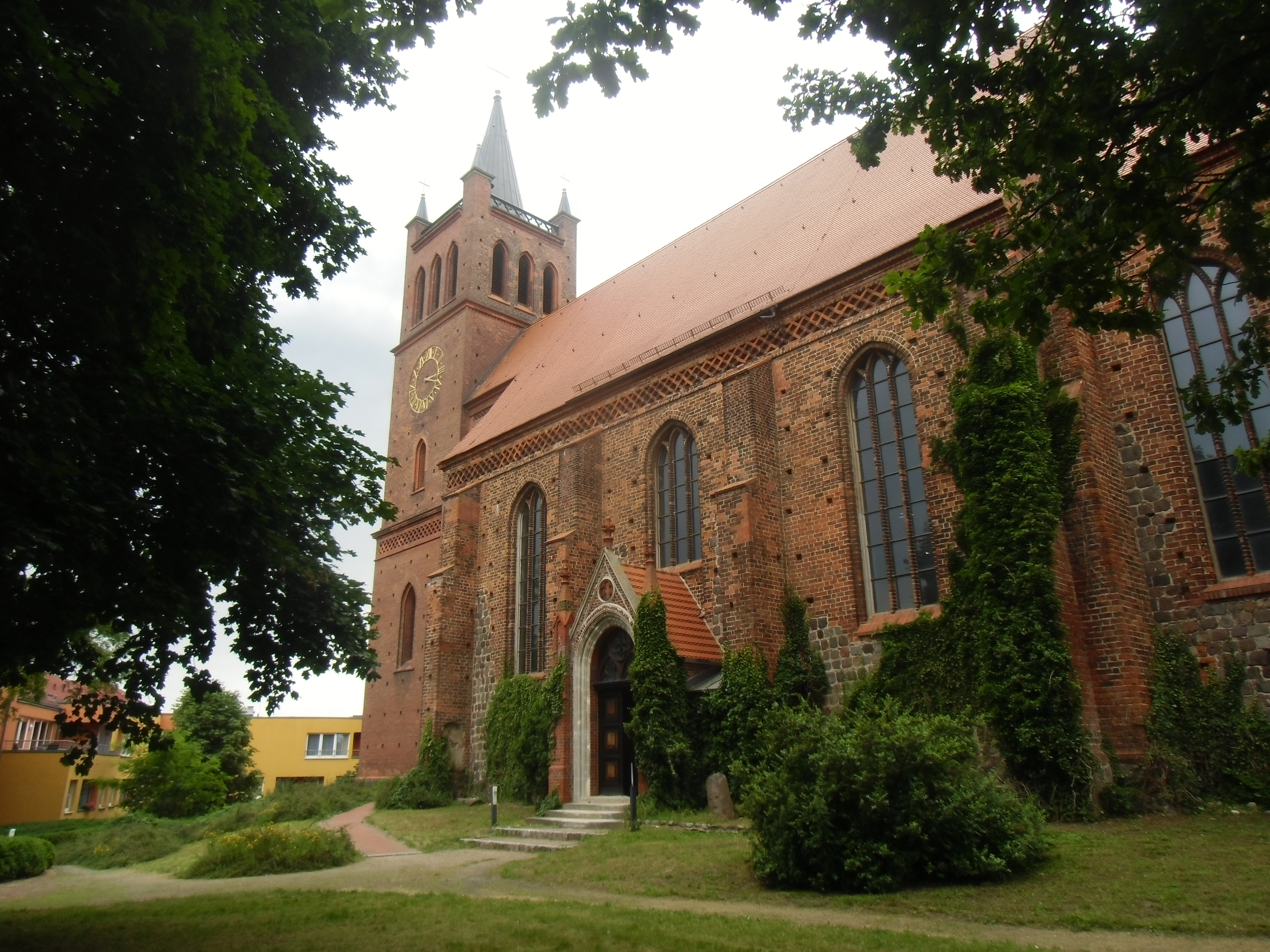
- 13th-century St. Mary Church

- Coat of arms

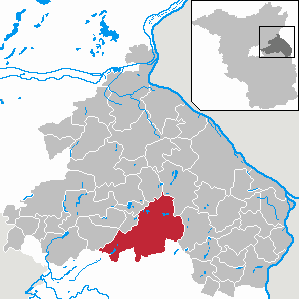
- Location of Müncheberg within Märkisch-Oderland district
- Interactive map of Müncheberg
- Location within Germany Location within Brandenburg
- Coordinates: 52°30′13″N 14°08′23″E
- Country: Germany
- State: Brandenburg
- District: Märkisch-Oderland

Government
  - Mayor (2016–24): Dr. Uta Barkusky (Left)

Area
  - Total: 152.29 km^{2} (58.80 sq mi)
- Elevation: 65 m (213 ft)

Population (2025-12-31)
  - Total: 6,776
  - Density: 44.49/km^{2} (115.2/sq mi)
- Time zone: UTC+01:00 (CET)
  - Summer (DST): UTC+02:00 (CEST)
- Postal codes: 15374
- Dialling codes: 033432
- Vehicle registration: MOL
- Website: www.muencheberg.de

Müncheberg (German pronunciation: [ˈmʏnçəˌbɛʁk]) is a small town in Märkisch-Oderland, in eastern Germany approximately halfway between Berlin and the border with Poland, within the historic region of Lubusz Land.

== Geography ==
Prior to 2003 the area today covered by Müncheberg was organized as the so-called "Amt Müncheberg". It included eight municipalities that were incorporated on March 31, 2002 to form the town of Müncheberg:

(population in parentheses)

- Müncheberg (5,190)
- Obersdorf (253)
- Hermersdorf (273)
- Trebnitz (509)
- Eggersdorf (345)
- Hoppegarten (268)
- Jahnsfelde (295)
- Münchehofe (102)

== History ==
The settlement was founded between 1225 and 1232 by Cistercian monks who had been given the land by the Piast Duke of Lower Silesia and soon-to-be monarch of Poland, Henry I the Bearded. A citation in a document from June 29, 1232, marks the official date of the founding. This first settlement was called Lubes (modern Polish: Lubiąż) by the monks in honor of the Lubiąż Abbey in Lower Silesia, Poland, where they originally came from. This name was not kept for long and in February 1233 the settlement was first mentioned as Munichberc (Middle High German for "Monk's Hill") in a charter by Pope Gregory IX. The settlement grew quickly and gained town privileges in 1245. The increasing prosperity led to the construction of a 7-metre-high (23 ft) city wall in 1319. After a war broke out over control of the region in 1319, the town came under the control of the Duchy of Pomerania. In 1319, Wartislaw IV granted new privileges to the town. In 1324, the town passed to Brandenburg, and between 1373 and 1415 it was part of the Bohemian (Czech) Crown.

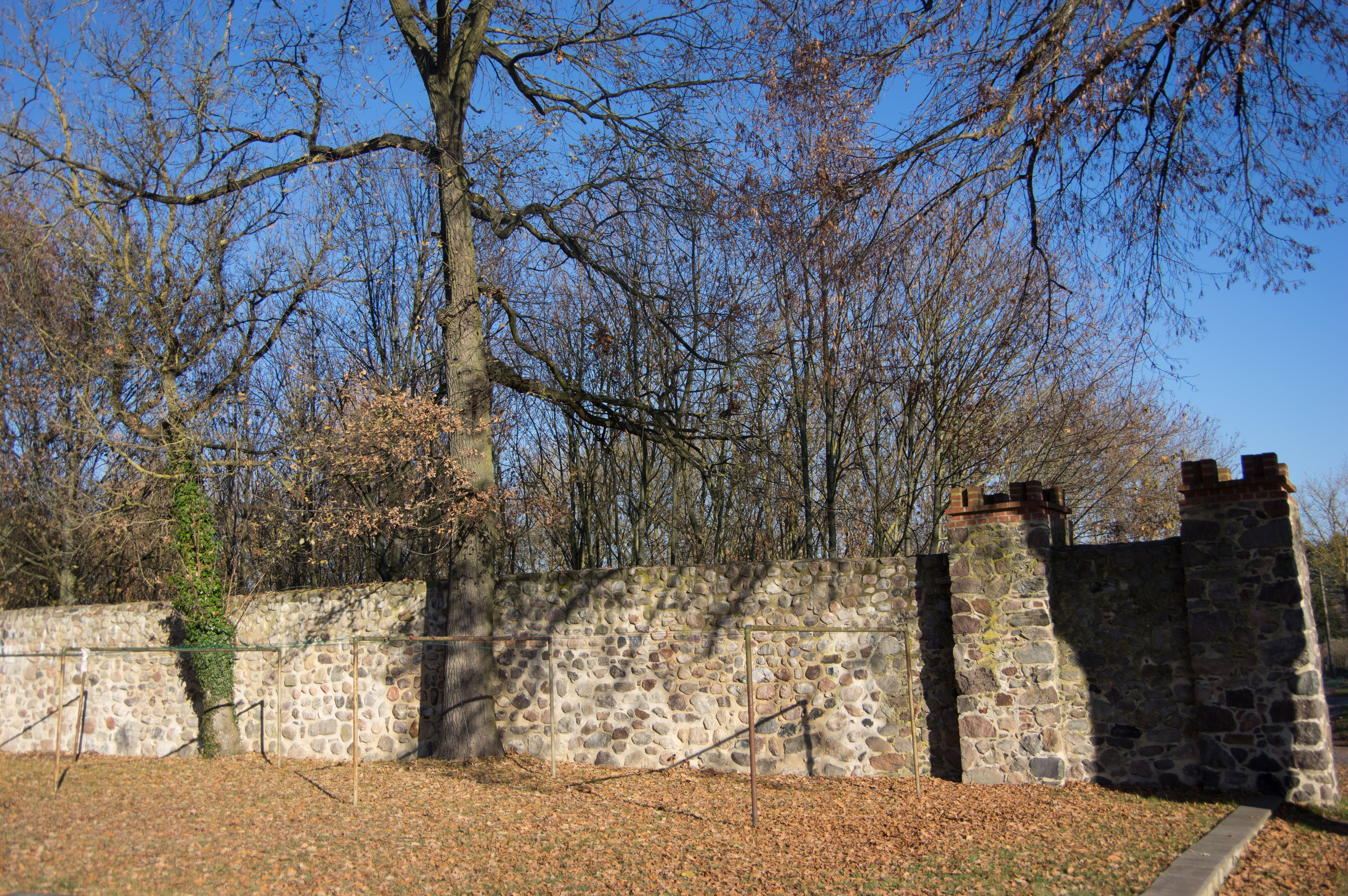
Town walls with the Berlin Gate

On April 17, 1432, the town was conquered by the Hussites who plundered the church and set the town on fire. In 1605 an epidemic of bubonic plague infested Müncheberg, killing 696 inhabitants. By 1624 about 1,300 people were living in the town again. Following the Thirty Year War (1618–1648) and further epidemics, the number of inhabitants dropped to less than 400 in 1655.

In 1697, a commune of French Huguenot refugees was founded in the town. Ca. 1700 the town became a permanent military base. In 1710, the French Church was consecrated. The population increased and by 1800 the town was flourishing again. The French commune was dissolved in 1806. The first school was constructed in 1852 as well as a new synagogue (1856) for the Jewish community. The Prussian Eastern Railway between Berlin and the what then eastern Germany (later independent Poland) started operating on October 1, 1867 giving Müncheberg a fast connection to the capital. The first volunteer fire brigade was formed in 1888.

During World War I, a German prisoner-of-war camp for Allies, including Americans, was operated in the town. During World War I, 129 soldiers from Müncheberg were killed in action. In 1928 the Kaiser Wilhelm Institute for Breeding Research was opened.

During World War II, a subcamp of the Sachsenhausen concentration camp was located in the present-day district of Trebnitz. The prisoners were Norwegians, Poles, Germans and Soviets. In early 1945, a death march of prisoners of various nationalities from the dissolved camp in Żabikowo to Sachsenhausen passed through the town. In the war, more than 400 inhabitants of Müncheberg died fighting on various battlefields in Europe. Combat in Müncheberg between the Wehrmacht and the Red Army took place from April 17 to April 19, 1945 and destroyed 85% of the town.

After World War II, Müncheberg was part of the Soviet occupation zone. From 1949 until the German Reunification on October 3, 1990, the town was a municipality in the Bezirk (district) Frankfurt (Oder) of the German Democratic Republic (East Germany).

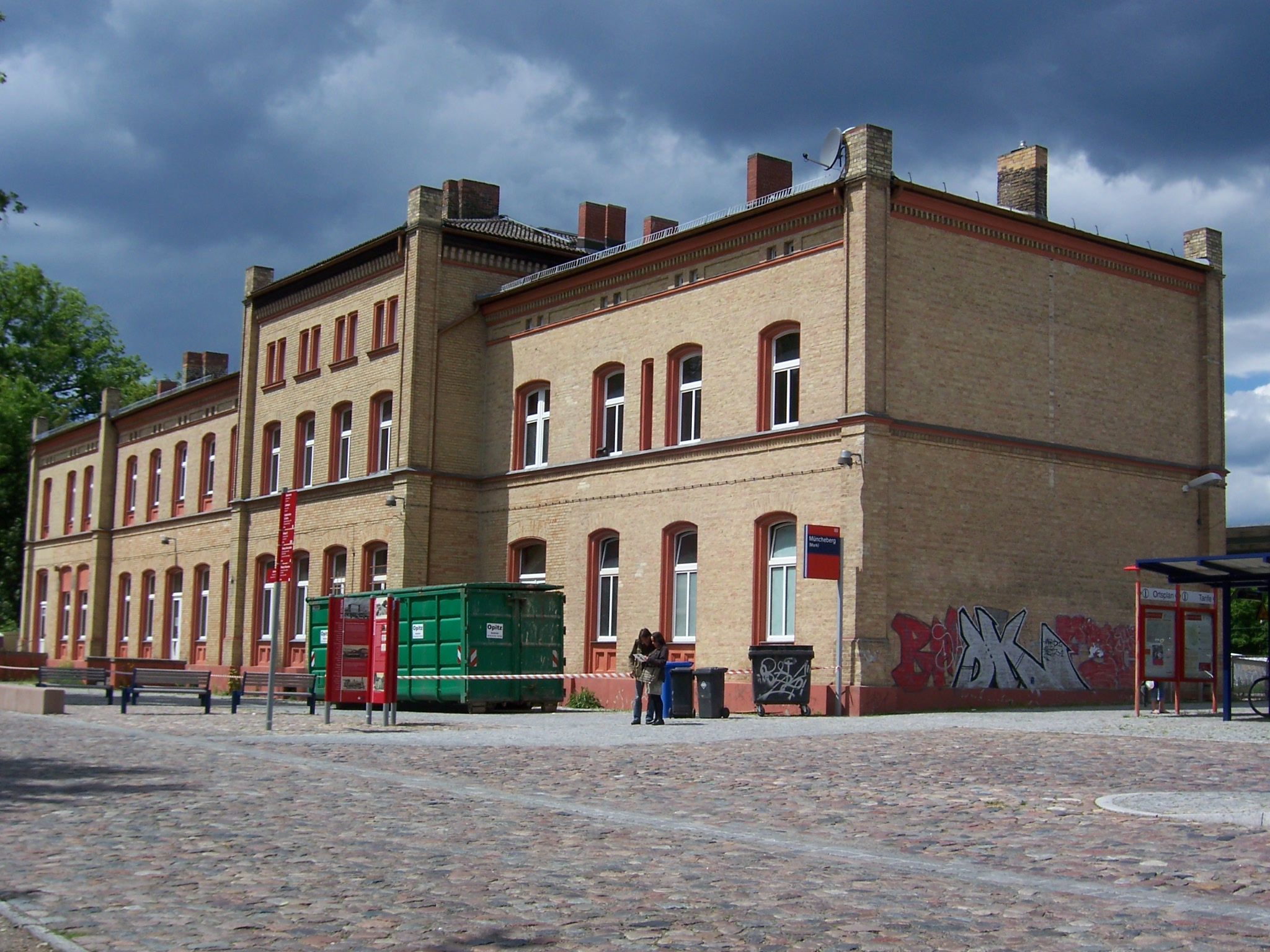
Müncheberg train station

== Demography ==
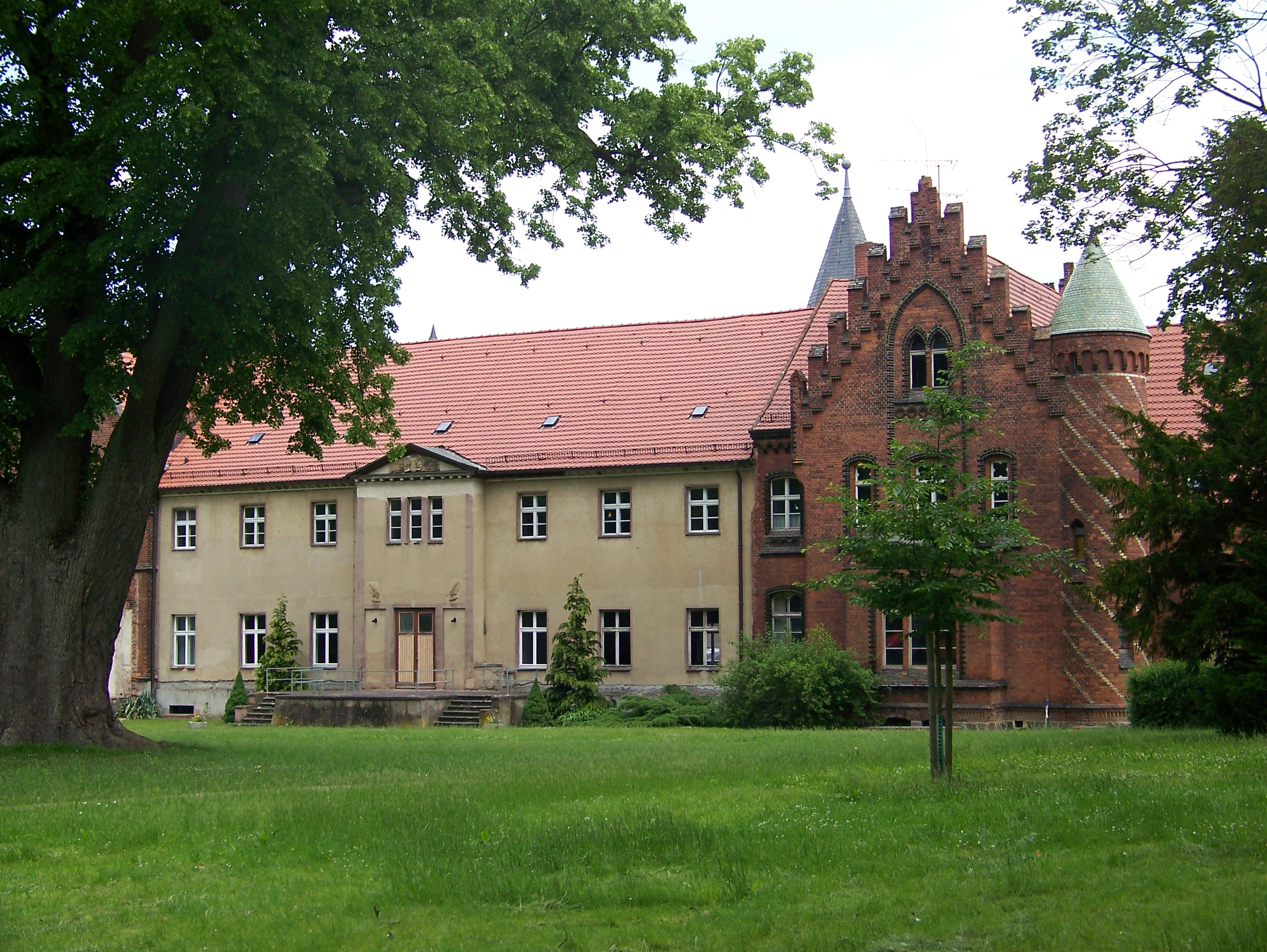
Castle in Jahnsfelde

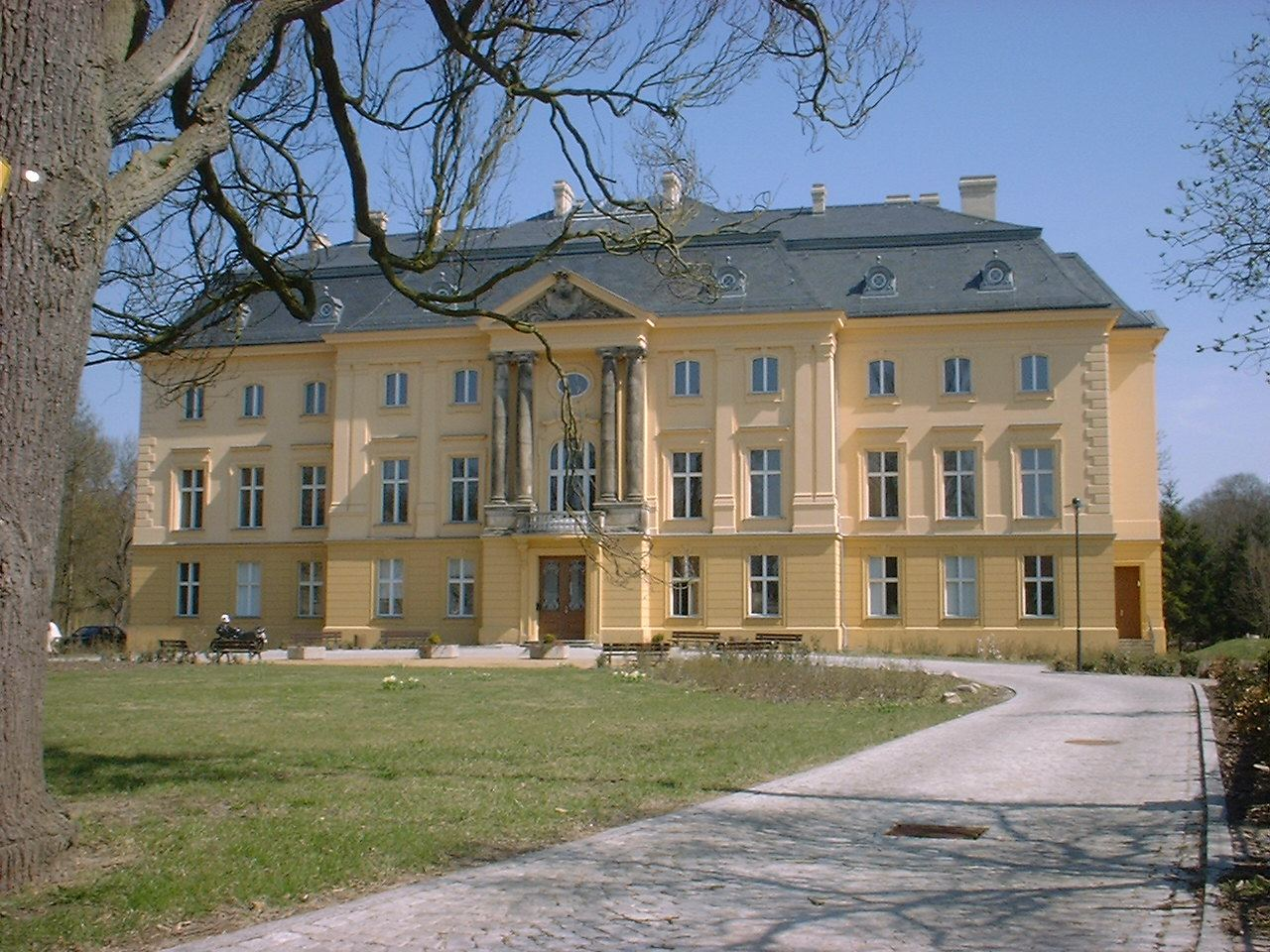
Palace in Trebnitz

Development of Population since 1875 within the Current Boundaries (Blue Line: Population; Dotted Line: Comparison to Population Development of Brandenburg state; Grey Background: Time of Nazi rule; Red Background: Time of Communist rule)

Recent Population Development and Projections (Population Development before Census 2011 (blue line); Recent Population Development according to the Census in Germany in 2011 (blue bordered line); Official projections for 2005–2030 (yellow line); for 2017–2030 (scarlet line); for 2020–2030 (green line)

Müncheberg: Population development
within the current boundaries (2020)

| Year | Pop. | ±% p.a. |
|---|---|---|
| 1875 | 6,792 | — |
| 1890 | 6,967 | +0.17% |
| 1910 | 6,695 | −0.20% |
| 1925 | 7,570 | +0.82% |
| 1939 | 8,131 | +0.51% |
| 1950 | 8,565 | +0.47% |
| 1964 | 7,933 | −0.55% |

| Year | Pop. | ±% p.a. |
|---|---|---|
| 1971 | 7,844 | −0.16% |
| 1981 | 7,408 | −0.57% |
| 1985 | 7,203 | −0.70% |
| 1990 | 7,006 | −0.55% |
| 1995 | 8,003 | +2.70% |
| 2000 | 8,018 | +0.04% |
| 2005 | 7,471 | −1.40% |

| Year | Pop. | ±% p.a. |
|---|---|---|
| 2010 | 7,150 | −0.87% |
| 2015 | 6,783 | −1.05% |
| 2016 | 6,820 | +0.55% |
| 2017 | 6,827 | +0.10% |
| 2018 | 6,870 | +0.63% |
| 2019 | 6,945 | +1.09% |
| 2020 | 7,003 | +0.84% |

== Mayors ==
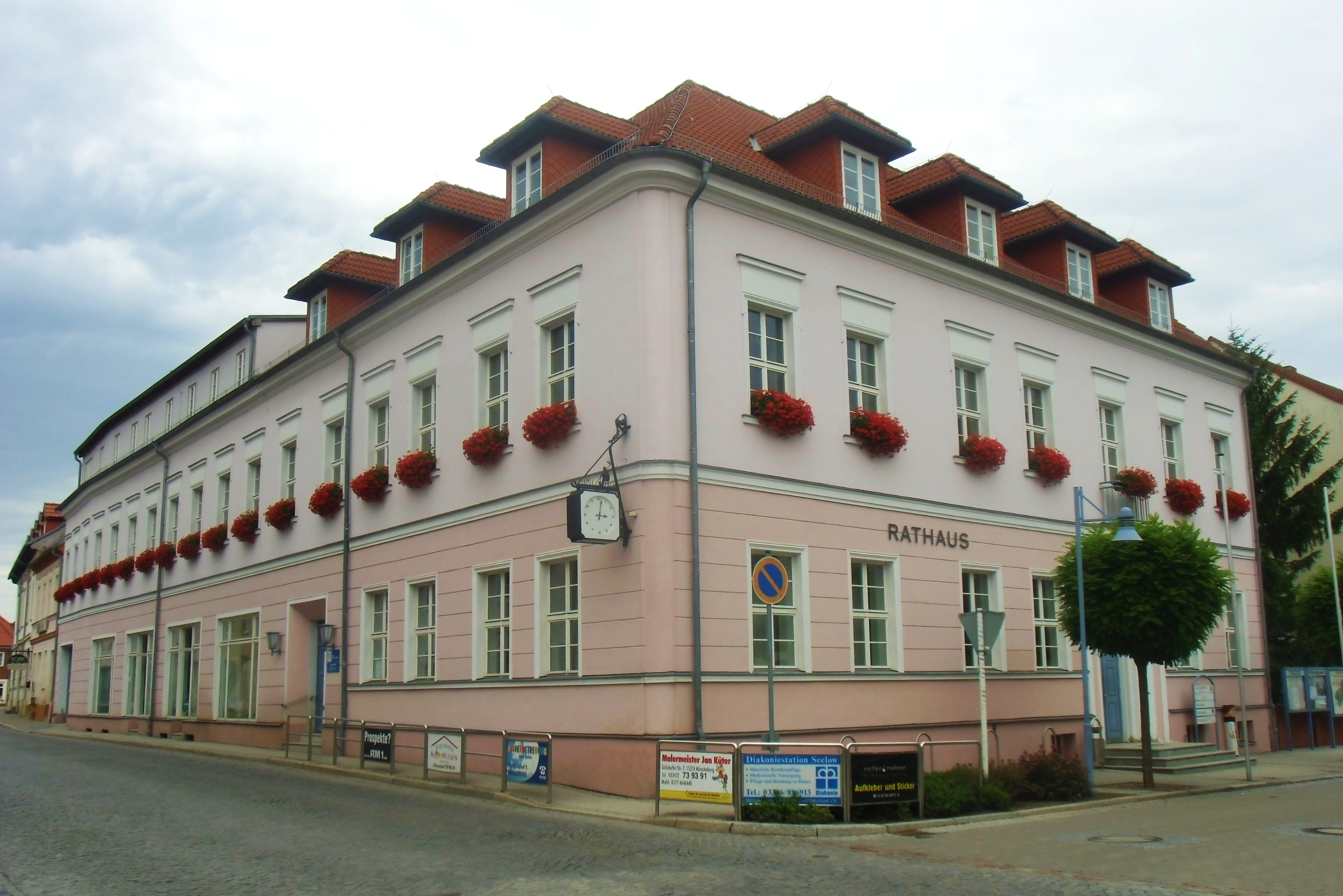
Town hall

- 2003-2008: Klaus Zehm
- since 2008: Uta Barkusky (The Left)

== Businesses ==
Several grocery stores are located in the town beside other stores that fulfill the everyday needs of the citizens:

- 2 pharmacies
- 2 gas stations
- several bakeries
- several butchers
- 2 florists
- 2 department stores
- book store
- electric appliances store

== Education and social life ==
Müncheberg serves as a regional center for the area. Facilities include:

- Grundschule Müncheberg (elementary school; grades 1-6)
- Gesamtschule mit gymnasialer Oberstufe Müncheberg (grades 7-10; with Fachoberschulreife as school-leaving diploma, qualifying for vocational school; - since 2005: grades 11–13; with Abitur as school leaving exam, qualifying for university)
- Berufsschule Müncheberg (vocational school)

The Oberschule Müncheberg (grades 7-10; with MSA as school-leaving exam, qualifying for university) which was established on the foundation walls of a former military barracks in 1991—as a sign of the dawning of a new age—was closed in July 2007 in the aftermath of the 1990s decline in the birth rate. Between August 22, 1991 and July 11, 2007, up to 750 pupils per year were finishing their secondary education at this grammar school.

Müncheberg is home to the ZALF - Leibniz-Zentrum für Agrarlandschaftsforschung (Leibniz Centre for Agricultural Landscape Research). Currently there are 428 scientists and technicians employed doing research at seven different institutes including the German Entomological Institute.

Several physicians and dentists have settled in Müncheberg providing medical care for the area. There is also an ambulance based in Müncheberg being responsible for all medical emergencies in the southern area of the county. Firefighting and most of all other emergencies are handled by the volunteer fire brigade of Müncheberg. Besides that there are also two police officers assigned to Müncheberg.

== Münchehofe ==
Münchehofe is the second-oldest and smallest township (102 residents) of the town of Müncheberg.

== People ==
- Ernst von Pfuel (1779-1866), Prussian general
