= Karl Friedrich Ermisch =

German teacher and entomologist

Karl Friedrich Ermisch (13 July 1898 – 22 July 1970) was a German teacher and entomologist.

== Biography ==
Ermisch was born in Dresden, Germany. His studies to become a teacher were interrupted by World War I, but in 1921, he became a teacher in Sohl. He spent 1933 to 1945 in Dusseldorf, returning to Sohl in 1945 to resume his teaching career, eventually becoming head teacher. He later went on to become Professor of Biology at two teacher training colleges. In 1954, he joined the College of Physical Culture in Leipzig. He finally retired in 1963, dying in 1970 in Leipzig.

In 1921, Ermisch received a small collection of beetles, which he soon began to expand. This work was to continue until his death, including collecting trips to the Caucasus and Bulgaria. Unfortunately, during a move, some 73 of the 200 boxes containing his collection were destroyed, including all of the Mordellidae that he had described up to that time.
