= Niederschönhausen =

Quarter of Berlin, Germany

- Quarter of Berlin
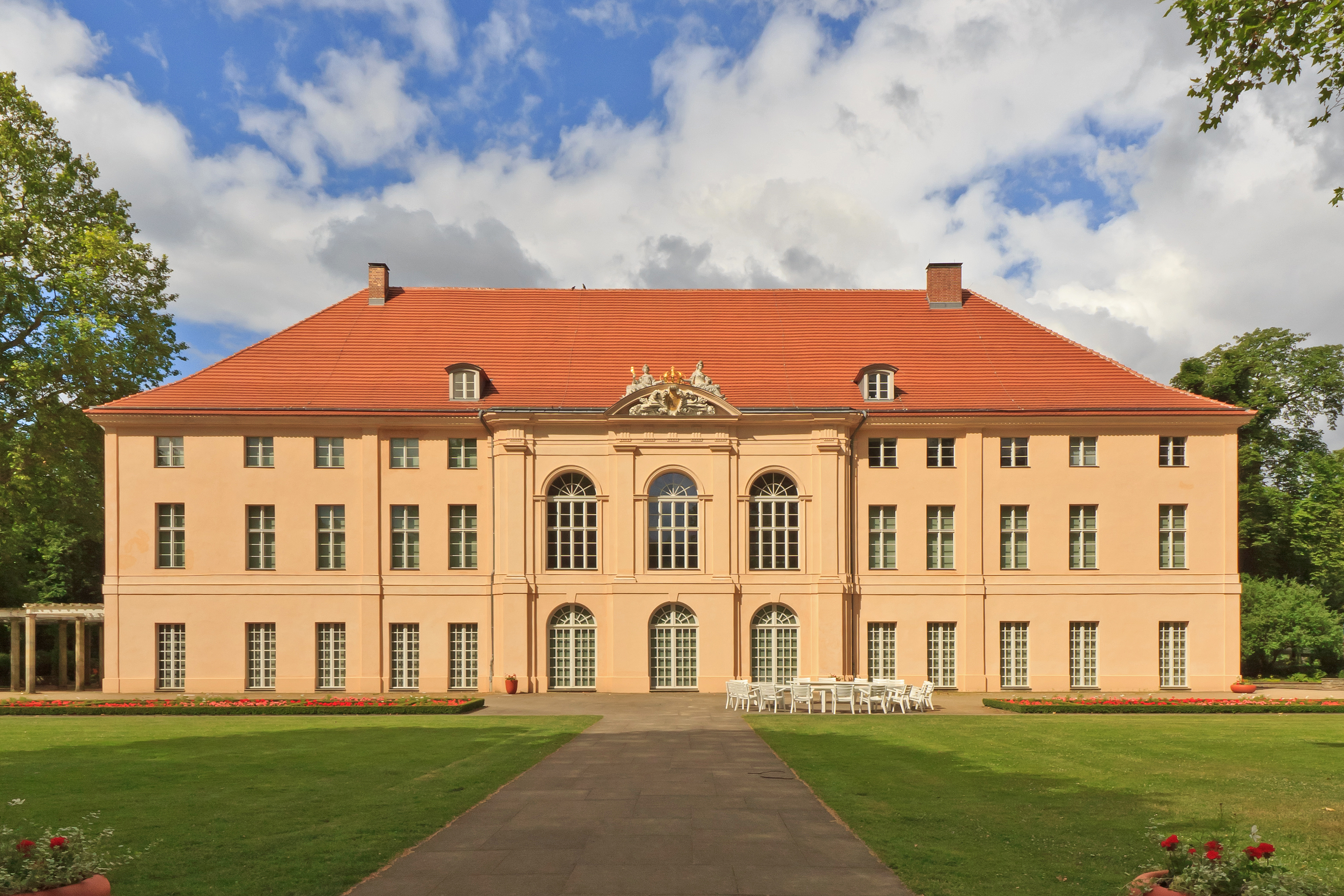
- Schönhausen Palace

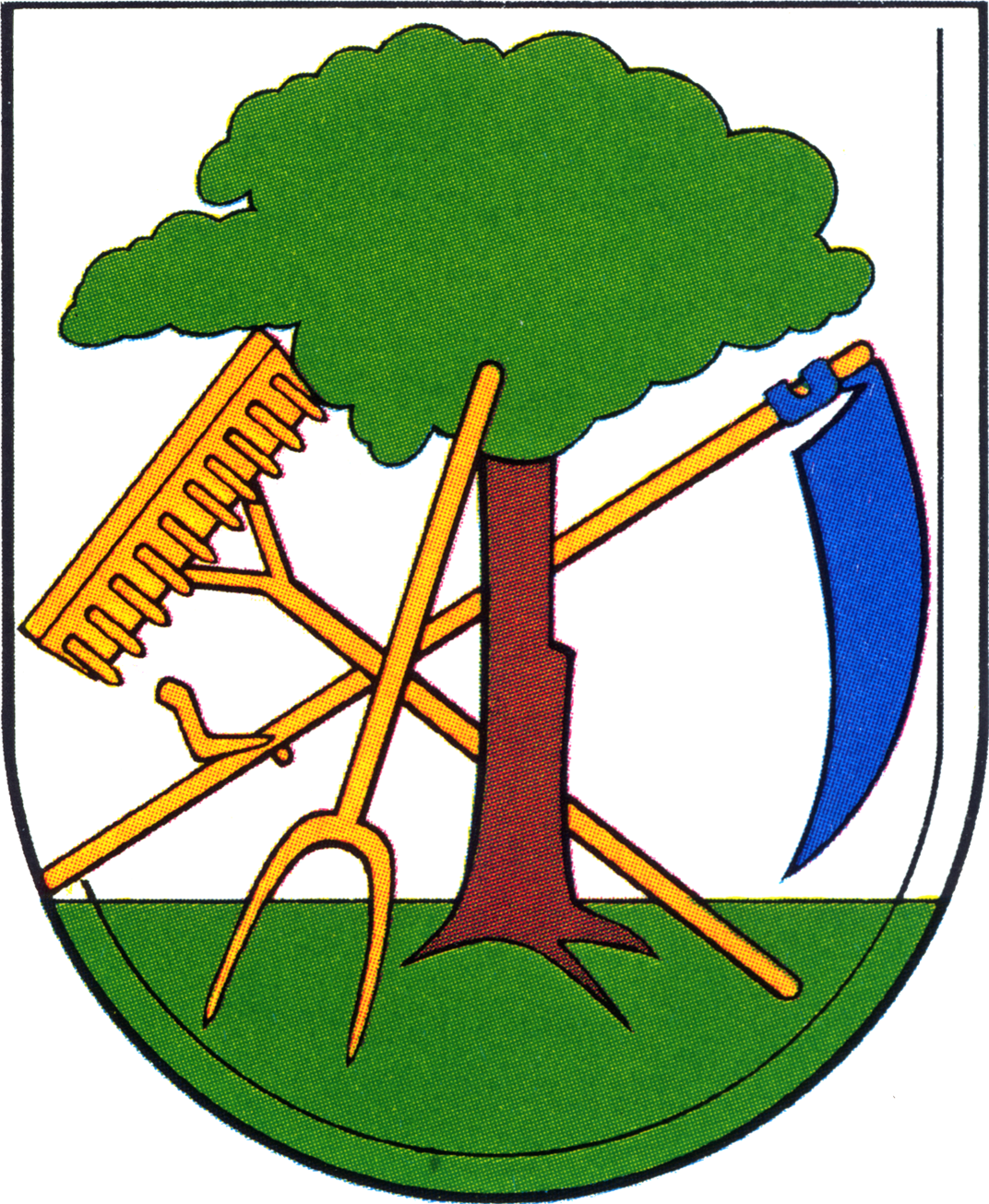
- Coat of arms

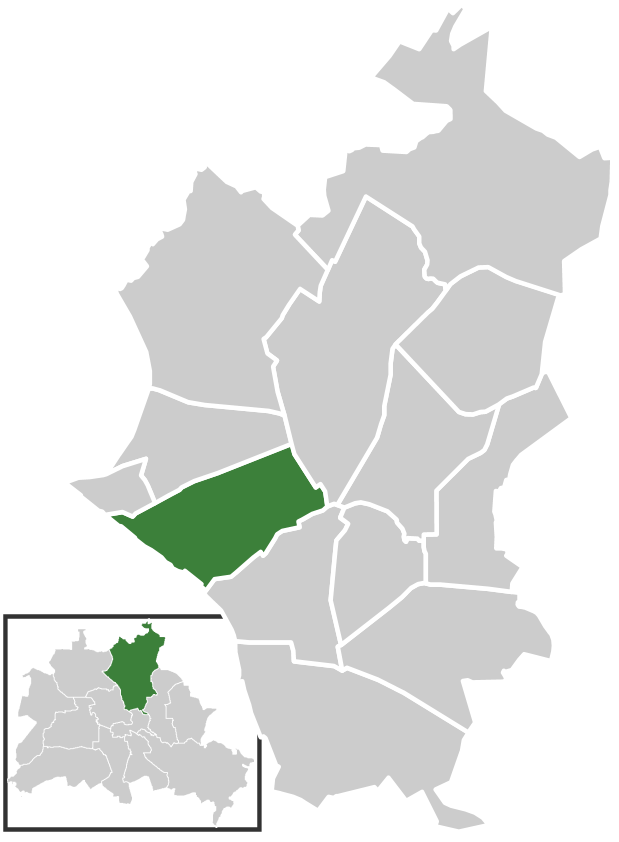
- Location of Niederschönhausen in Pankow district and Berlin
- Interactive map of Niederschönhausen
- Location within Germany Location within Berlin
- Coordinates: 52°35′00″N 13°24′00″E
- Country: Germany
- State: Berlin
- City: Berlin
- Borough: Pankow
- Founded: 1910
- Subdivisions: 3 zones

Area
  - Total: 6.49 km^{2} (2.51 sq mi)
- Elevation: 52 m (171 ft)

Population (2024-12-31)
  - Total: 33,324
  - Density: 5,130/km^{2} (13,300/sq mi)
- Time zone: UTC+01:00 (CET)
  - Summer (DST): UTC+02:00 (CEST)
- Postal codes: 13156
- Vehicle registration: B

Niederschönhausen (German pronunciation: [ˈniːdɐˈʃøːnˌhaʊ̯zn̩], literally "Lower Schönhausen") is a locality (Ortsteil) within the borough (Bezirk) of Pankow in Berlin, Germany. It is also known as "Pankow-Schönhausen" to differ it from Hohenschönhausen in Berlin-Lichtenberg. From 1949 until 1960 Schönhausen Palace and the adjacent Majakowskiring quarter were the residence of several members of the East German government, commonly referred to as Pankow by the West German media.

== Geography ==
=== Overview ===
Located north of the Berlin city centre, Niederschönhausen borders with the localities of Wilhelmsruh, Rosenthal in the north, Französisch Buchholz in the east, Pankow in the south and the Reinickendorf locality (in the homonymous borough) along the Berlin Northern Railway line in the west. The locality comprises several green areas, as the Schönholzer Heide, the Brosepark, the Schlosspark Pankow, the Bürgerpark and the cemetery Friedhof Pankow III.

=== Subdivision ===
Niederschönhausen is divided into 3 zones (Ortslagen):

- Majakowskiring
- Nordend
- Schönholz

== Transport ==
The locality is served by the tramway line M1 and by the bus lines 107, 150, 155 and 250. The S-Bahn crosses Niederschönhausen at the borders between Schönholz and Reinickendorf and serves it at Schönholz station (lines S1, S25 and S85).

== History ==
A settlement called Schonenhusen inferior or Nydderen Schonhusen was, like many others in the Margraviate of Brandenburg, first mentioned in the 1375 doomsday book (Landbuch) of Emperor Charles IV. The linear village was probably founded about 1230 by German colonists in the course of the medieval Ostsiedlung migration. The estates were purchased by the Elector Frederick III ("King in Prussia" as Frederick I from 1701), who had the local manor house rebuilt in a Baroque style as a Hohenzollern residence. In 1740 the new king Frederick the Great left Schönhausen Castle (Schloß Schönhausen) to his consort Elisabeth Christine who lived here until her death in 1797.

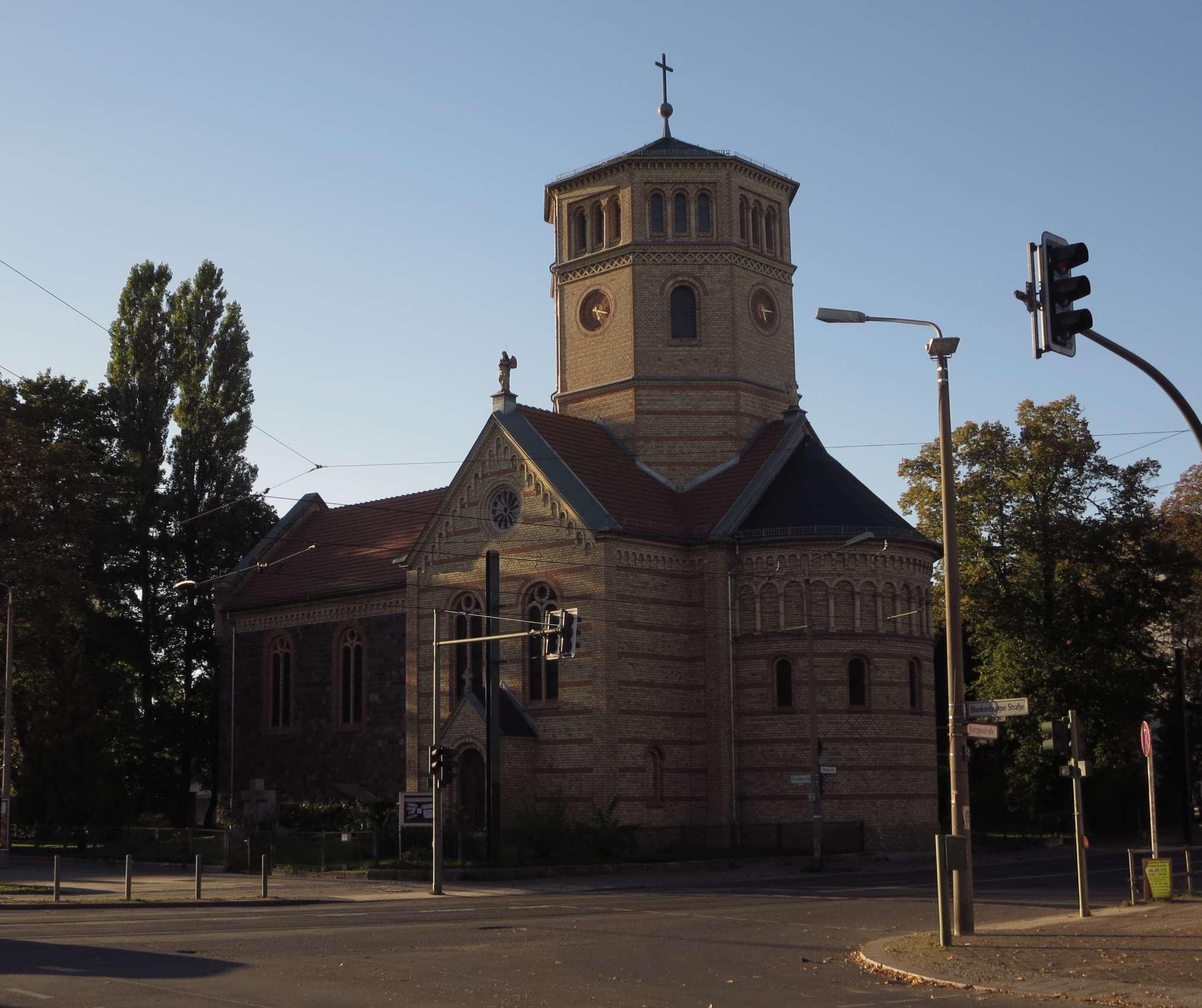
Friedenskirche

The residential area that arose after nearby Berlin had become the German capital is characterised by mansions and dwelling houses, developed primarily around the year 1910 on the former estates of Schönhausen Palace. This short-lived municipality of the former Niederbarnim district merged into Berlin with the "Greater Berlin Act" in 1920.

Part of East Berlin during the "Cold War", Schönhausen Palace from 1949 served as the seat of East German President Wilhelm Pieck and later as a guest house of the East German government. Johannes R. Becher and several East German government officials resided in the secluded Majakowskiring quarter, until they moved to Wandlitz in 1960. From 1961 to 1989 the western boundary of Niederschönhausen with Reinickendorf (in West Berlin) was part of the Berlin Wall.

In June 1990 Schönhausen Palace was a site of the Two Plus Four talks that paved the way for German reunification. Today the adjacent premises house the German Federal Academy for Security Policy. The palace has been restored in its original Baroque condition and since 2009 is open to the public.

== Photogallery ==
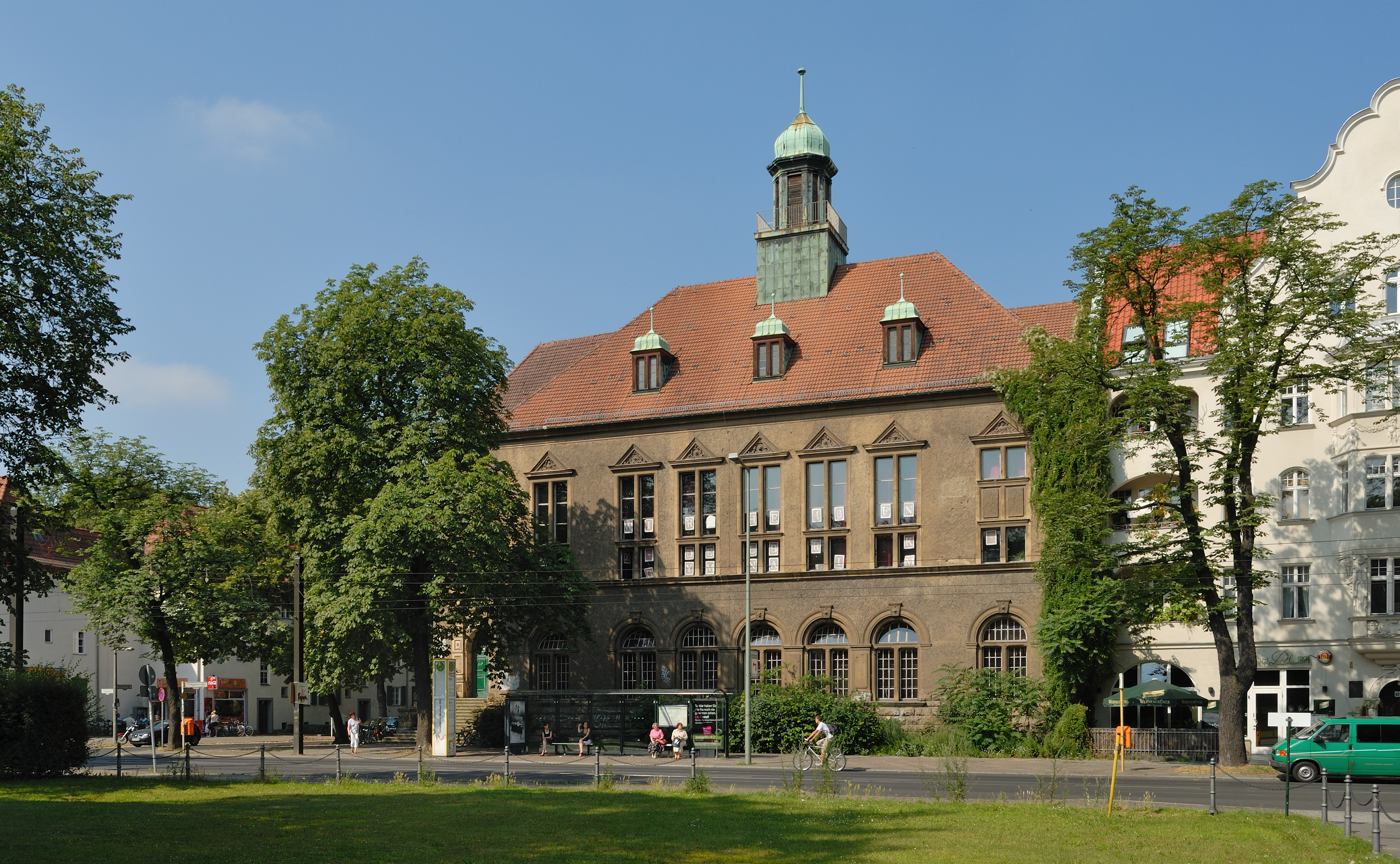
Max-Delbrück-Gymnasium

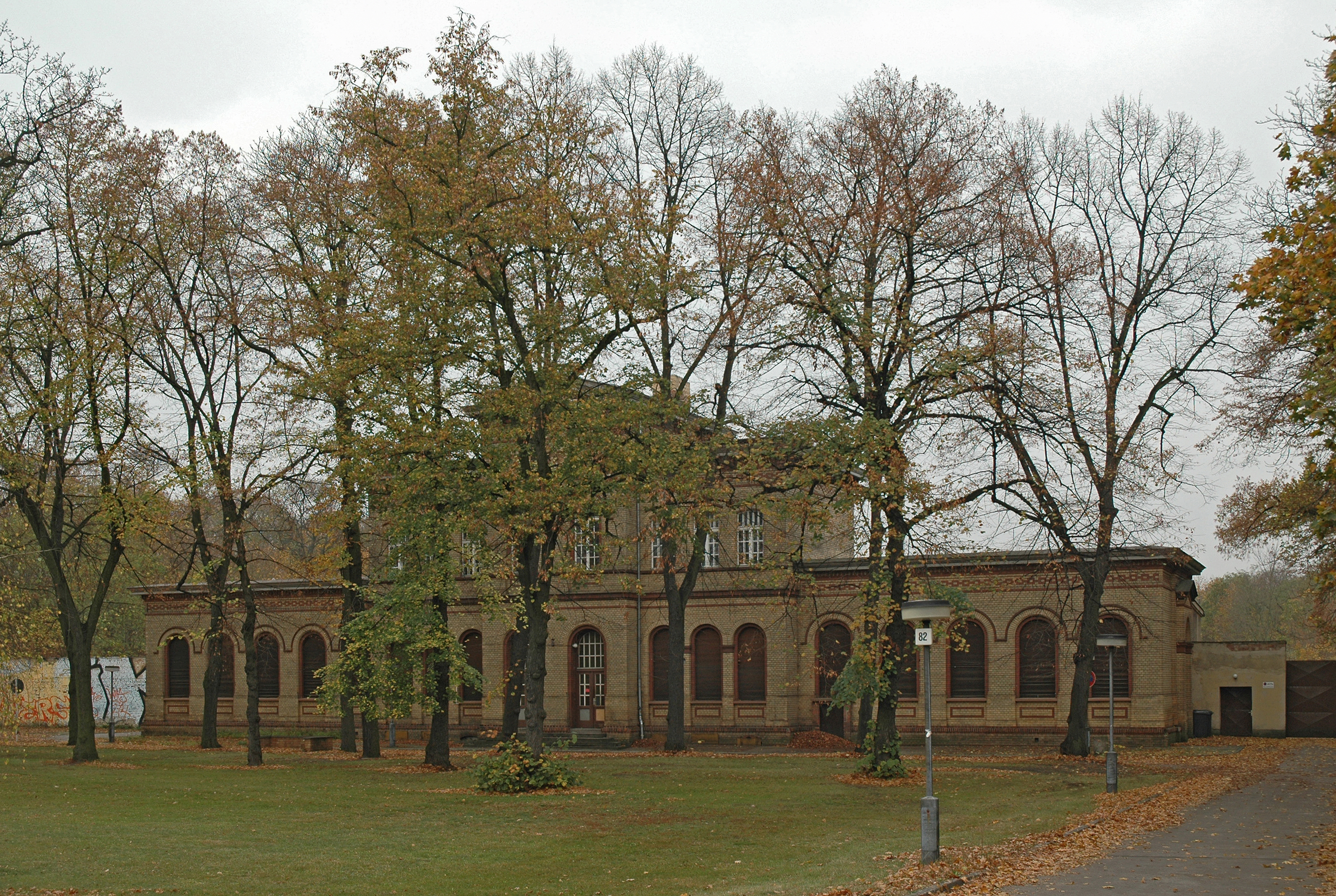
A Club house in the Schönholzer Heide

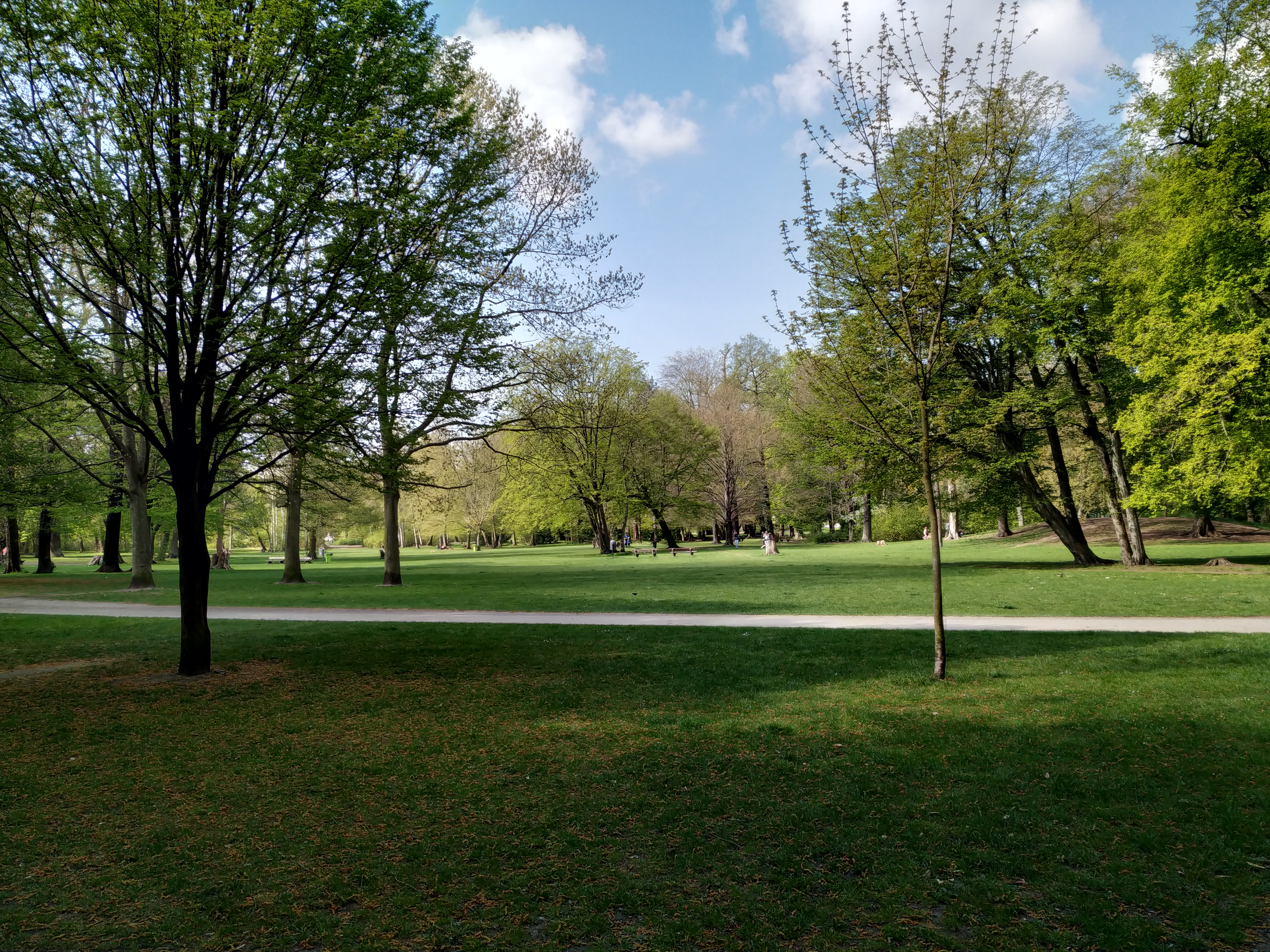
The Schlosspark
