= Lehnitz station =

Railway station in Oranienburg, Germany

Coordinates: 52.7411°N 13.2635°E

Lehnitz
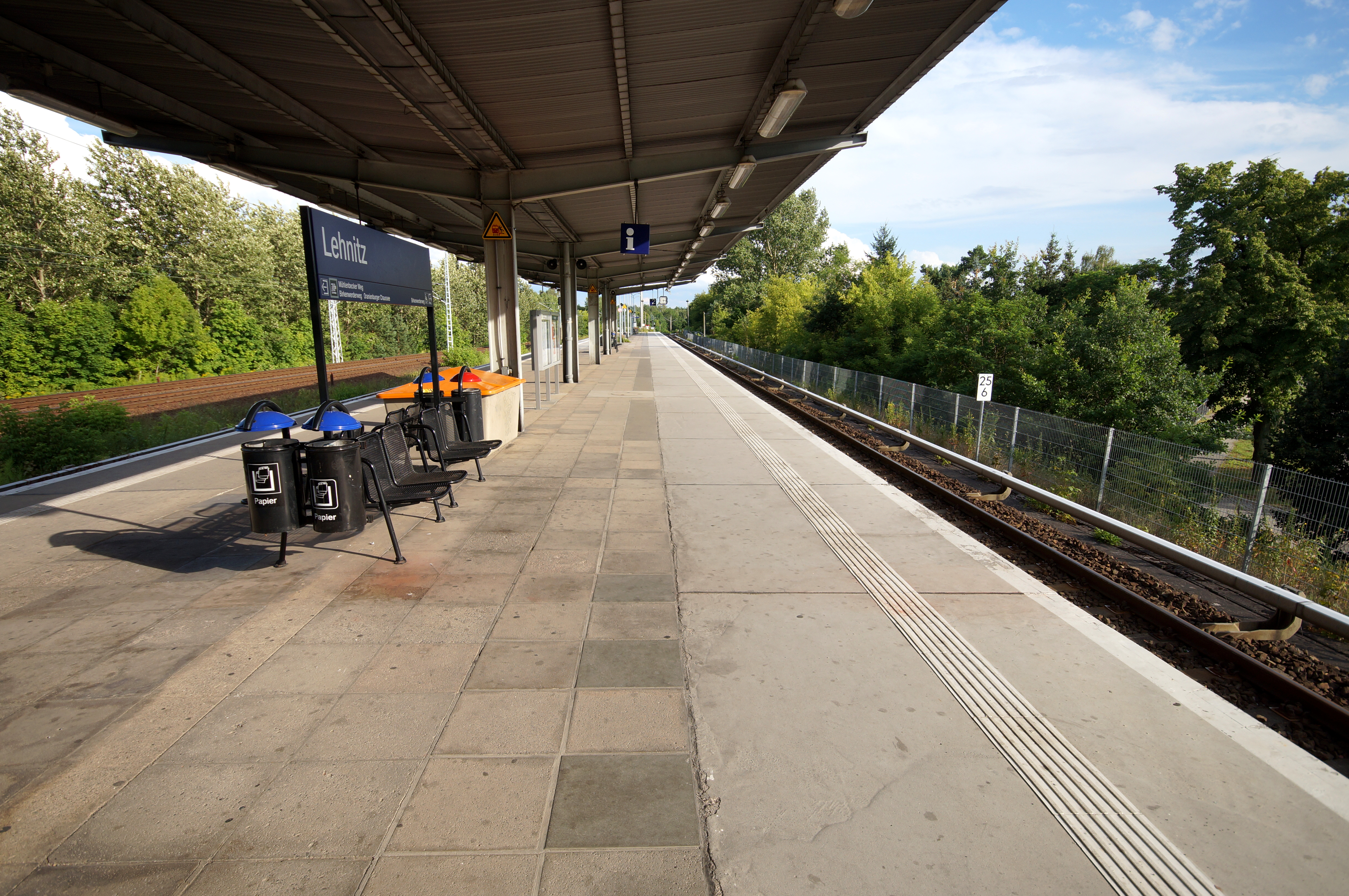
- Platform of Lehnitz station

General information
- Location: Birkenwerderweg 2; 16515 Lehnitz; Brandenburg; Germany
- Owner: DB Netz
- Operator: DB Station&Service
- Lines: Berlin Northern Railway (KBS 200.1)
- Platforms: 1 island platform
- Tracks: 2
- Train operators: S-Bahn Berlin

Other information
- Station code: 3617
- DS100 code: BLEN
- IBNR: 8081722
- Category: 5
- Fare zone: VBB: Berlin C/5053
- Website: www.bahnhof.de

History
- Opened: 10 April 1878; 148 years ago
- Rebuilt: 1977–1980
- Electrified: : 4 October 1925; 100 years ago main line: 15 December 1983; 42 years ago

Services
Preceding station	Berlin S-Bahn	Following station
Oranienburg Terminus	S1	Borgsdorf towards Wannsee
Location

Lehnitz (in German Bahnhof Lehnitz) is a railway station in the district of Lehnitz, Oranienburg, Germany. It is served by route S1 of the Berlin S-Bahn, with trains in both directions stopping every 20 min during the hours of operation.

== Location ==
The station is situated centrally in the former municipality of Lehnitz which in 2003 was incorporated into Oranienburg, 25.7 km (16.0 mi) from the former Nordbahnhof on the line of Berliner Nordbahn and 1.7 km (1.1 mi) from Oranienburg station. It is in fare zone Berlin C of Verkehrsverbund Berlin-Brandenburg.

== History ==
The passenger-only station was opened on 10 April 1878. On 4 October 1925 an electric S-Bahn train reached the station for the first time. While south of Birkenwerder station the tracks for suburban and long-distance traffic were separate, both services shared the tracks north of it, and thus also in Lehnitz station. One track of the line was lifted after 1945 for war reparations. After it was relaid, suburban and long-distance traffic each used a separate track. Since only S-Bahn trains stopped in Lehnitz, the eastern platform was therefore not used from 1964.

Work started in 1977 to upgrade the line to four tracks. A new bridge across the Oder Havel Canal was built north of Lehnitz station which was completely renewed. The tracks were moved west, and the new station, southwest of the old one, was opened in March 1980. The S-Bahn trains originally used only the western track, and the long-distance trains passed the eastern side of the platform without stopping. The new long-distance tracks east of the platform were taken into service in April 1989, and S-Bahn trains have used both sides of the platform since then.

== Buildings and engineering works ==
The original station was situated at ground level and had two side platforms and a small station building. The new station was built on an embankment and has an island platform which is accessed at its northern end by stairs from a foot tunnel, and at its southern end by a barrier-free ramp. The latter access route crossed the western S-Bahn track and is protected by crossing gates. The old station building was dismantled in 1981/1982, and no traces remain of it and the former gated level crossing.
