= Majakowskiring =

Street in Berlin, Germany

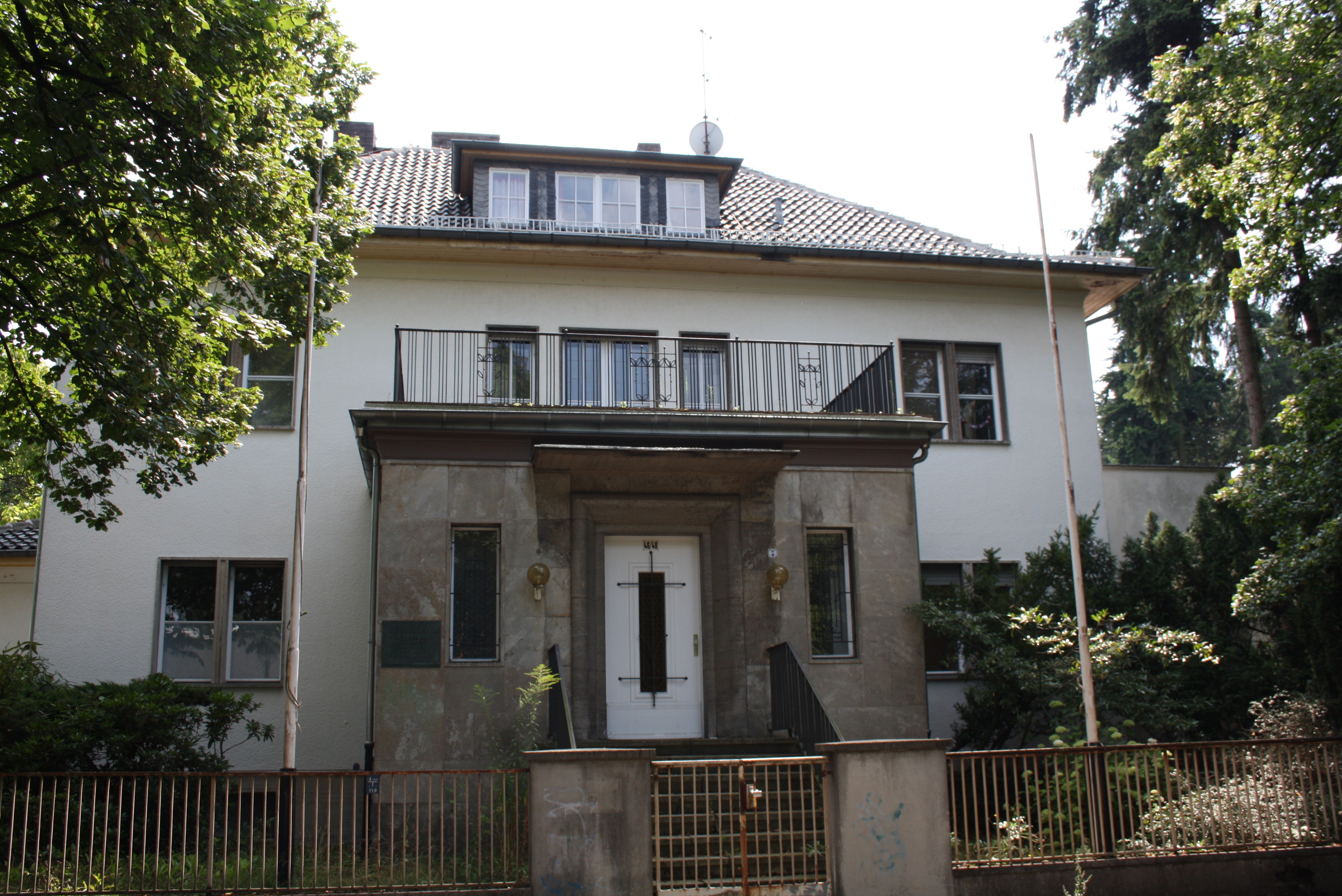
- Otto Grotewohl's house at Majakowskiring 46
- Interactive map of Majakowskiring
- Former names: Northern section: Viktoriastraße; Southern section: Kronprinzenstraße; (before 1900–1950); Majakowskistraße; (short time)
- Namesake: Vladimir Mayakovski
- Type: Street
- Location: Berlin, Germany
- Quarter: Niederschönhausen
- Nearest metro station: Schönholz
- Coordinates: 52°34′32″N 13°24′20″E
- East end: Pestalozzistraße
- Major junctions: Rudolf-Ditzen-Weg; Köberlsteig; Boris-Pasternak-Weg; Stille Straße
- West end: Grabbeallee

The Majakowskiring (named after Vladimir Mayakovsky) is an ellipse-shaped street in the Pankow district of Berlin, Germany, in the Niederschönhausen locality. It was famous as the residence of many senior figures in the government of the German Democratic Republic.

The Majakowskiring neighbourhood (Ortslage) is situated between Grabbeallee to the west and northwest, Ossietzkystraße and Schlosspark to the east, Schloss Schönhausen to the northeast, and the Panke river to the south.

== History ==
Until 4 May 1950, the northern section was called Kronprinzenstraße and the southern section Viktoriastraße. It was then renamed after the Russian poet Vladimir Mayakovski. For a short time it was called Majakowskistraße.

Most of the houses were built in the 1920s and are mainly mansions which were inhabited by industrialists and artists; most of them were first requisitioned by the Soviets after the Second World War. In exceptional cases the former owners were allowed to remain if they continued to pay rent, for example in the case of the house No. 29. When the owners left East Berlin in 1950, these also were expropriated.

Until 1960, the members of the GDR government lived here, after the houses were converted to the taste of the new inhabitants by architects like Hans Scharoun. The Majakowskiring (and likewise the Pankow district) became a synonym for the GDR government. Thus Konrad Adenauer spoke of the "gentlemen in Pankoff", and Udo Lindenberg sang of the "special train to Pankow". The government representatives living in the Majakowskiring quarter became shielded from the outside world.

After the October 1956 Hungarian Revolution, the East German leadership was afraid of the effect of such riots in the East Germany and decided that it was better for the elite to live in less populated place. At first, it was decided to move to Hoppegarten, east of East Berlin, because there was a fast escape route from there over the motorway eastward. In the end, a complex was built in Waldsiedlung, Bernau bei Berlin, and the leadership moved there in 1960.

Because of this sealing-off, people called the quarter Städtchen (little town). When Lotte Ulbricht wanted to return to the Majakowskiring after the death of her husband Walter Ulbricht in 1973, the barriers and controls were waived. However she was forbidden to return to the house they originally lived in. Instead, she was assigned house number 12, in which she lived up to her death in 2002. In 1975, house 28/30 was demolished, as part of the process of erasing every reminder of Walter Ulbricht from history.

== Individual houses ==
Houses and their inhabitants:

- Majakowskiring 2 guesthouse of the GDR government
- Majakowskiring 12 Lotte Ulbricht (after the death of her husband 1973)
- Majakowskiring 28/30 Lotte and Walter Ulbricht
- Majakowskiring 29 Wilhelm Pieck, later guesthouse of the mayor of East Berlin
- Majakowskiring 34 Johannes R. Becher
- Majakowskiring 46/48 Otto Grotewohl
- Majakowskiring 47 residence of the Polish ambassador in the GDR, now the Centre for Historical Research of the Polish Academy of Sciences in Berlin
- Majakowskiring 50 Heinrich Rau
- Majakowskiring 58 Erich Honecker
