= Berlin-Wilhelmsruh station =

Railway station in Berlin, Germany

Coordinates: 52.581°N 13.363°E

Berlin-Wilhelmsruh
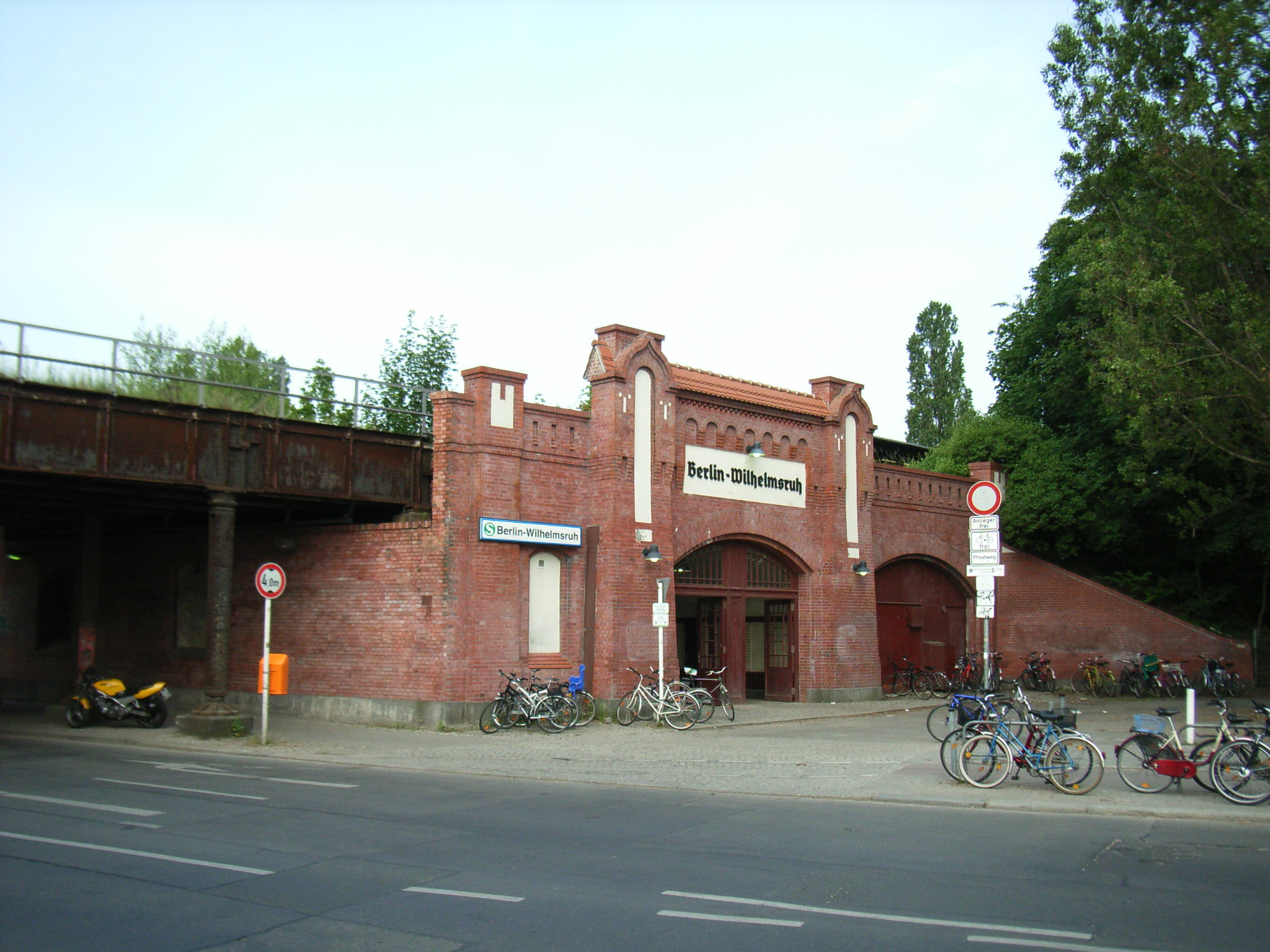

General information
- Location: Reinickendorf, Reinickendorf borough, Berlin; Germany
- Lines: Northern Railway; Berlin–Groß Schönebeck Railway (unconnected since 1961)

Construction
- Architect: Ernst Schwartz

Other information
- Station code: 0567
- DS100 code: BWM
- Category: 4
- Fare zone: VBB: Berlin B/5656

History
- Opened: 10 July 1877; 149 years ago
- Electrified: 5 June 1925; 101 years ago
- Former names: 1877-1891 Rosenthal; 1891-1893 Reinickendorf (Rosenthaler Straße); 1893-1937 Reinickendorf-Rosenthal

Key dates
- 1908–1910: embankment and new station built
- 1945, late April – June 10: operation interrupted
- 1984, 9 January – 30 September: operation interrupted

Services
Preceding station	Berlin S-Bahn	Following station
Wittenau towards Oranienburg	S1	Schönholz towards Wannsee
Wittenau towards Waidmannslust	S85	Schönholz towards Grünau
Location
- Location within Berlin

Berlin-Wilhelmsruh (in German S-Bahnhof Berlin-Wilhelmsruh) is a railway station in the neighbourhood of Reinickendorf, right adjacent to the locality of Wilhelmsruh, in the city of Berlin, Germany. Until the 1938 administrative border shift, the station happened to be within the boundaries of Wilhelmsruh. It is served by the Berlin S-Bahn and a local bus. The reconnection of the station with the Berlin–Groß Schönebeck Railway is planned.

The railway station also represented the junction of two abandoned branches of the Prussian Northern Railway and the Heidekraut Railway (operated by the Niederbarnimer Eisenbahn). Due to its position outside the Wall (in Reinickendorf), from 1961 to 1989 the S-Bahn station was usable only for West Berlin, at the southern entrance. The Heidekraut rail terminal was instead moved to Rosenthal station, now abandoned.
