= Wilhelmsruh =

- Quarter of Berlin
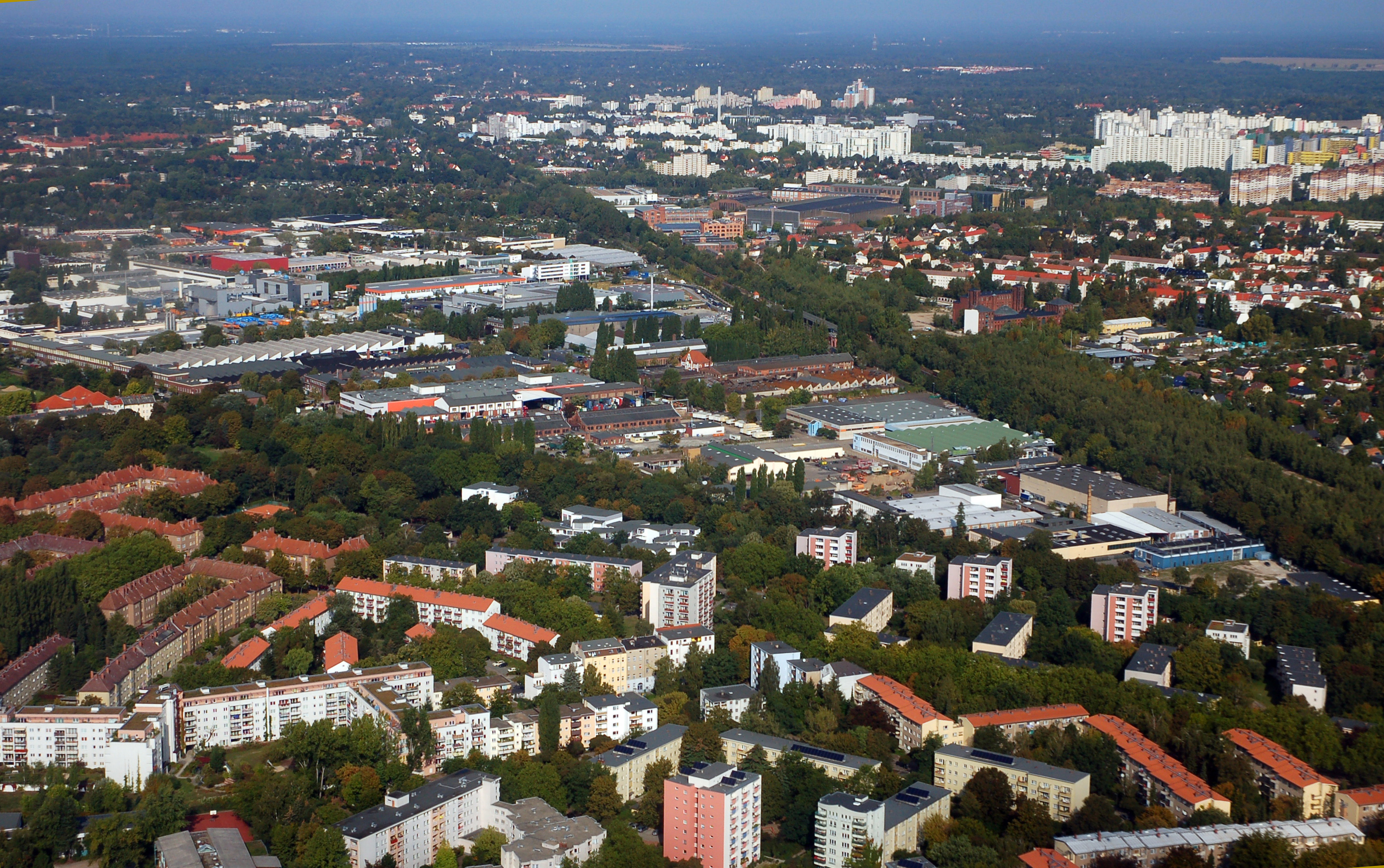
- Aerial view

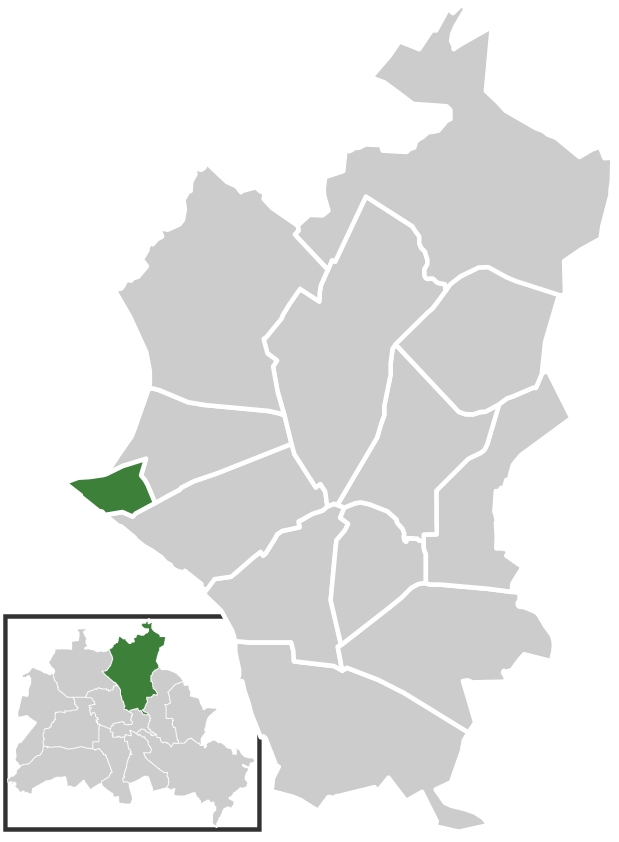
- Location of Wilhelmsruh in Pankow district and Berlin
- Interactive map of Wilhelmsruh
- Location within Germany Location within Berlin
- Coordinates: 52°35′14″N 13°22′05″E
- Country: Germany
- State: Berlin
- City: Berlin
- Borough: Pankow
- Founded: 1875

Area
  - Total: 1.37 km^{2} (0.53 sq mi)
- Elevation: 50 m (160 ft)

Population (2024-12-31)
  - Total: 8,279
  - Density: 6,040/km^{2} (15,700/sq mi)
- Time zone: UTC+01:00 (CET)
  - Summer (DST): UTC+02:00 (CEST)
- Postal codes: 13158
- Vehicle registration: B

Wilhelmsruh (German: [ˈvɪlhɛlmsˌʁuː]) is a German locality (Ortsteil) within the borough (Bezirk) of Pankow, Berlin. It is the city's smallest locality, after Halensee and Hansaviertel.

== History ==
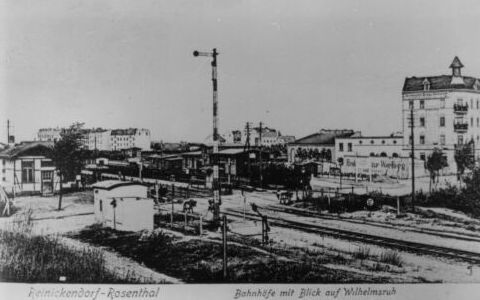
Wilhelmsruh station in 1903

In the locality, originally part of Rosenthal, it was built a country house named Nordend which received occasionally the designation name Rosenthal II. In 1892 the settlement received the name of Colonie Wilhelmsruh. As part of Nordend municipality (now a zone of Rosenthal), it merged into Berlin in 1920 with the "Greater Berlin Act". During the "Cold War" it was part of East Berlin bordering with the western sector, and it was crossed by the Berlin Wall from 1961 to 1989.

== Geography ==
Wilhelmsruh is located in the northern suburb of Berlin, in a corner of Pankow district surrounded by Rosenthal, Niederschönhausen, Reinickendorf and Märkisches Viertel (both in Reinickendorf district). Its western corner is close to Wittenau but it doesn't borders with this locality. In its territory, Wilhelmsruh counts two little lakes: Wilhelmsruhsee and Garibalditeich; this one named after Giuseppe Garibaldi and located in Garibaldistraße.

== Transport ==
The locality is served by the S-Bahn lines S1 and S85, at Wilhelmsruh station, and by the bus lines 122 and 155.

The railway station also represented the junction of two abandoned branches of the Prussian Northern Railway and the Heidekraut Railway. Due to its position outside the Wall (in Reinickendorf), from 1961 to 1989 the S-Bahn station was usable only for West Berlin, at the southern entrance. The Heidekraut rail terminal was instead moved to Rosenthal station, now abandoned.

== Photogallery ==
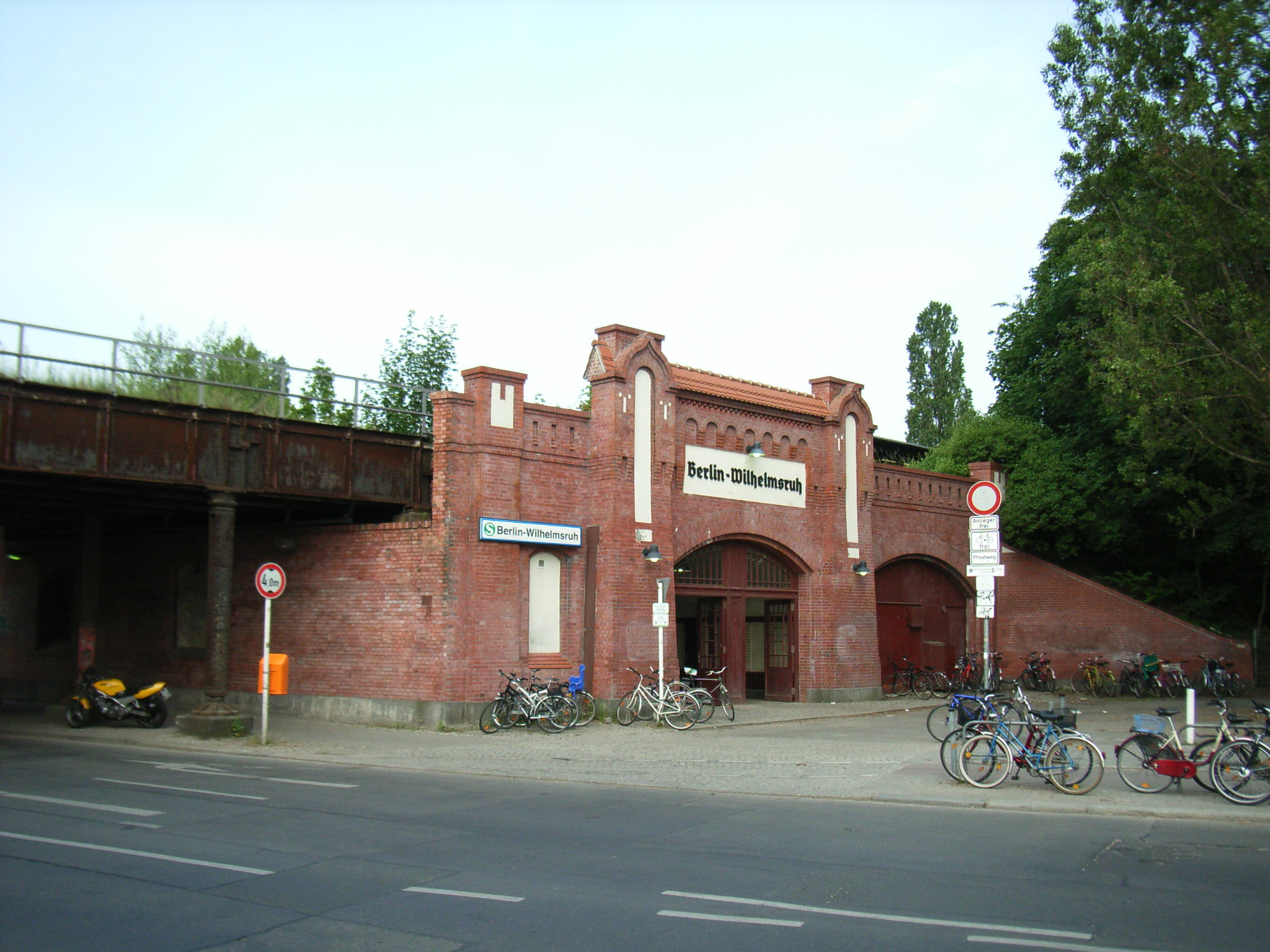
Wilhelmsruh station

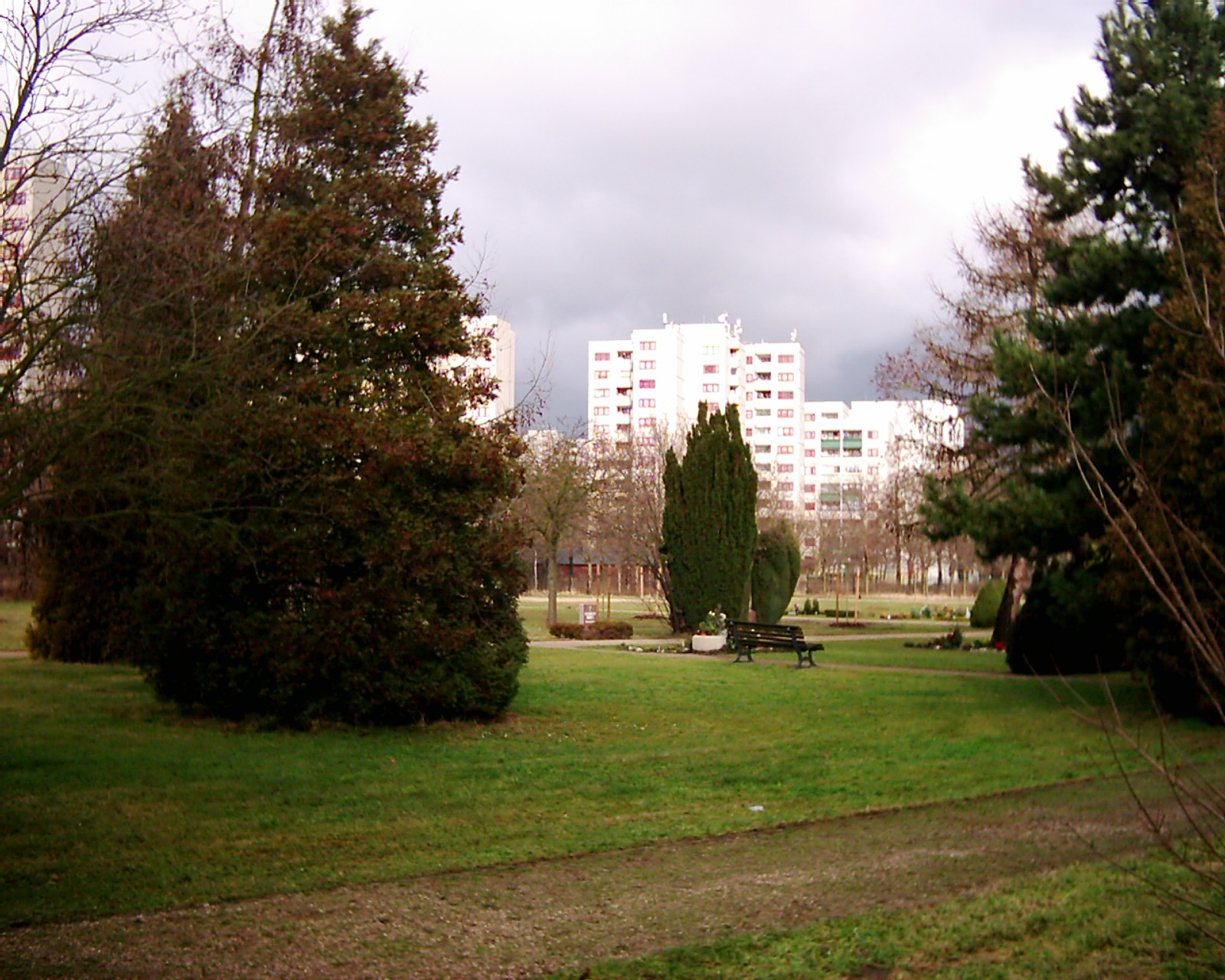
Cemetery "Pankow VII"

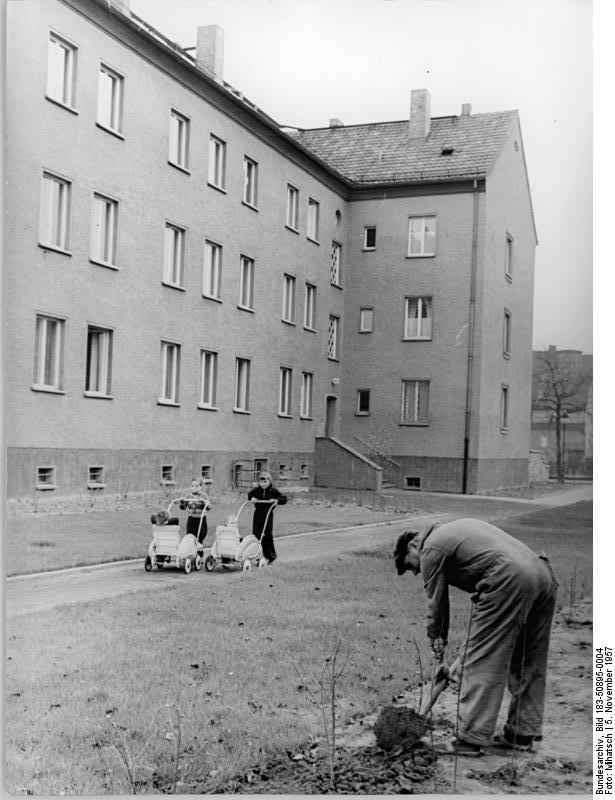
Fontanestraße in 1957
