= Borgsdorf station =

Railway station in Borgsdorf, Germany

Coordinates: 52.7155°N 13.2764°E

Borgsdorf
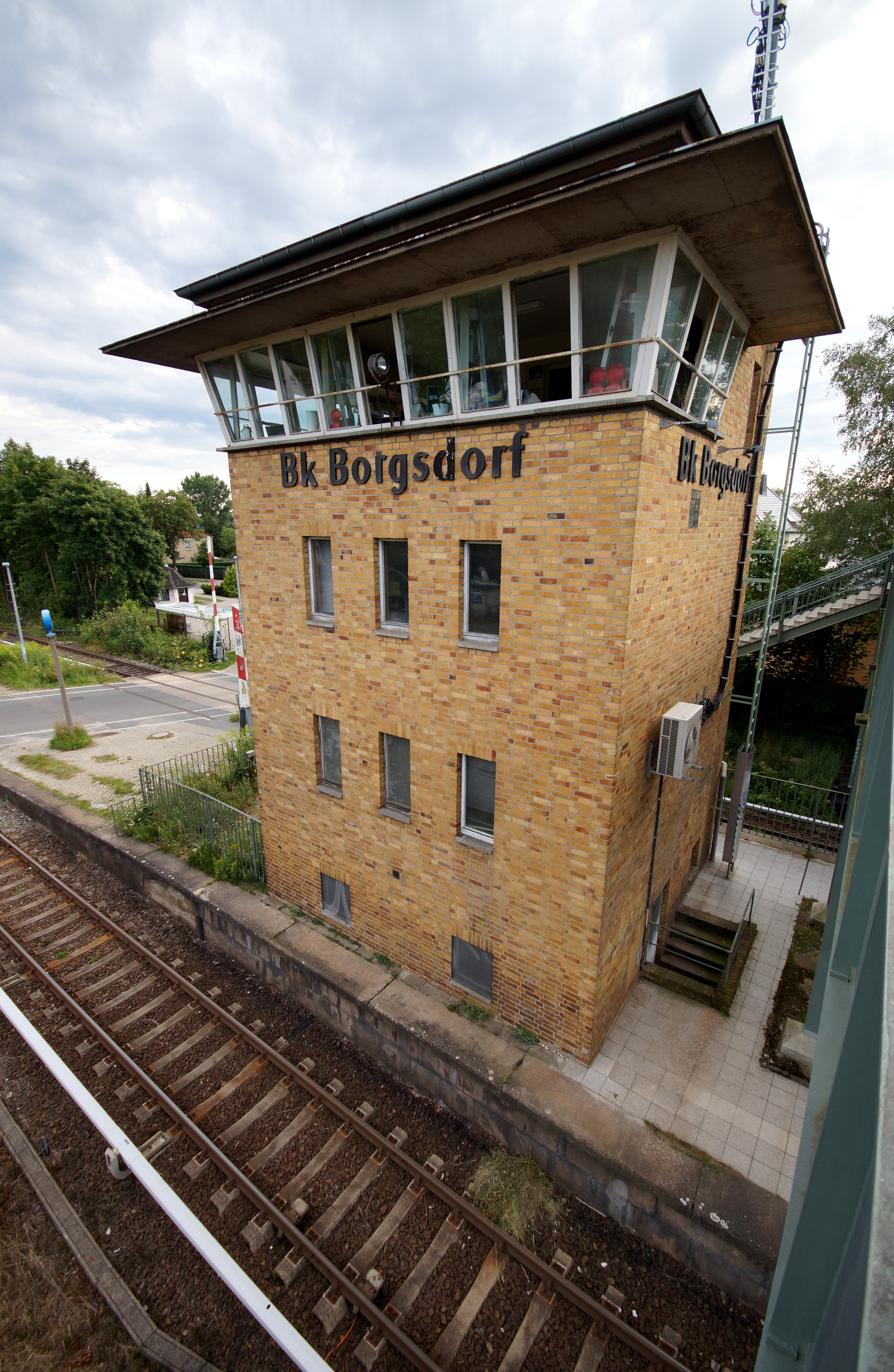

General information
- Location: Bahnhofstraße 1; 16556 Borgsdorf; Brandenburg; Germany
- Owner: DB Netz
- Operator: DB Station&Service
- Lines: Berlin Northern Railway (KBS 200.1)
- Platforms: 1 island platform
- Tracks: 2
- Train operators: S-Bahn Berlin
- Connections: 816

Other information
- Station code: 0782
- DS100 code: BBOR
- Category: 4
- Fare zone: VBB: Berlin C/5153
- Website: www.bahnhof.de

Services
Preceding station	Berlin S-Bahn	Following station
Lehnitz towards Oranienburg	S1	Birkenwerder towards Wannsee
Location

Borgsdorf (in German Bahnhof Borgsdorf) is a railway station in the village of Borgsdorf (town Hohen Neuendorf), Brandenburg, Germany. It is served by the Berlin S-Bahn. There is also a connection to local bus service.
