= Berlin Wollankstraße station =

Railway station in Pankow, Germany

Wollankstraße
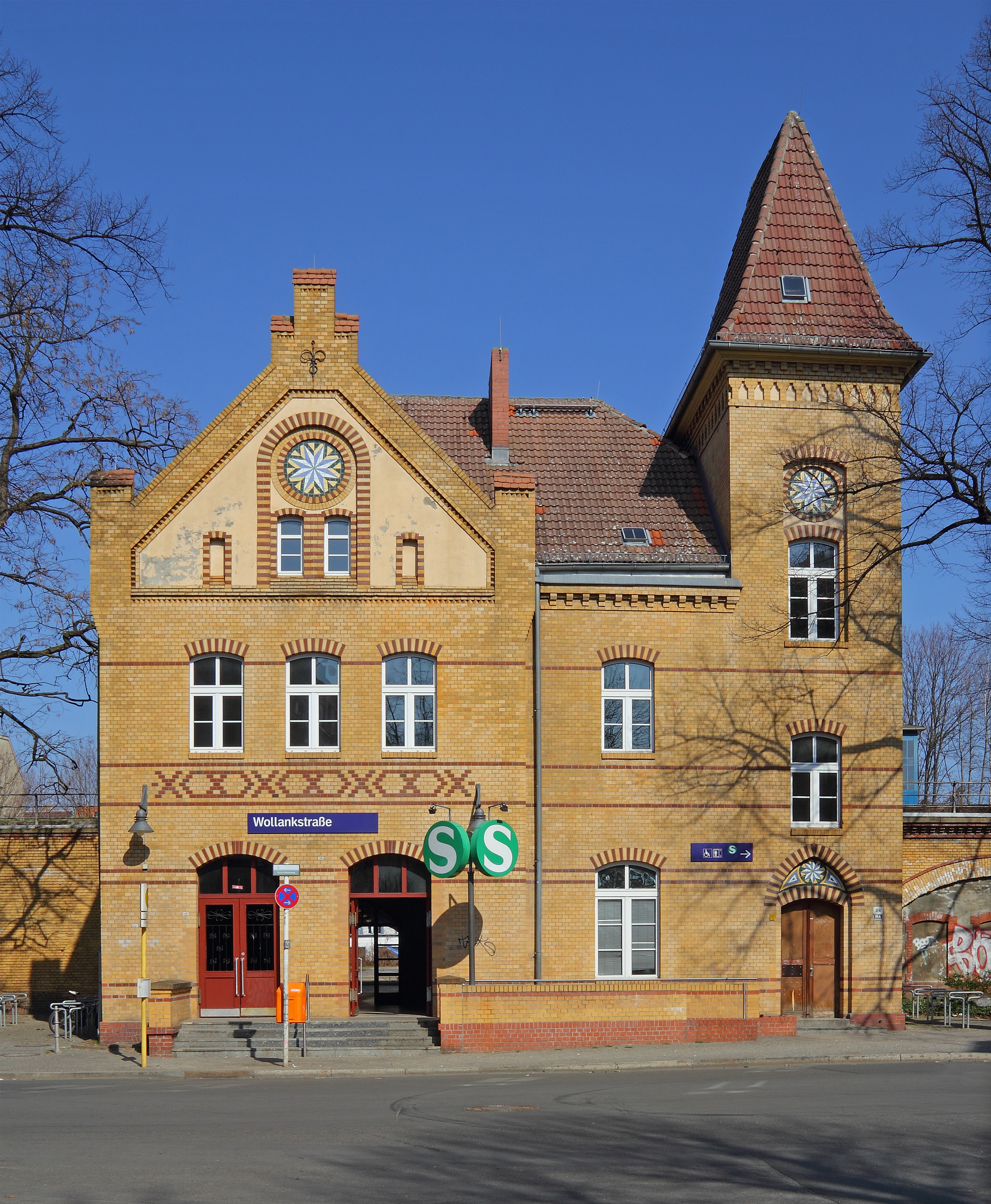

General information
- Location: Pankow, Pankow borough, Berlin; Germany
- Coordinates: 52°33′55″N 13°23′32″E
- Line: Nordbahn (KBS 200.1, 200.25, 200.85)
- Platforms: 2

Other information
- Station code: 6871
- DS100 code: BWOK
- Category: 4
- Fare zone: : Berlin B/5656
- Website: www.bahnhof.de

History
- Opened: 10 July 1877; 149 years ago
- Electrified: 5 June 1925; 101 years ago
- Former names: 1877–1879 Prinzenallee; 1880–1893 Prinzen–Allee (Pankow); 1893–1911 Pankow (Nordbahn); 1911–1937 Pankow Nordbahn

Key dates
- 1893: current building erected
- 1945, late Apr – 10 Jun: operation interrupted
- 1984, 9 Jan – 30 Sep: operation interrupted

Services
Preceding station	Berlin S-Bahn	Following station
Schönholz towards Oranienburg	S1	Bornholmer Straße towards Wannsee
Schönholz towards Hennigsdorf	S25	Bornholmer Straße towards Teltow Stadt
Schönholz towards Waidmannslust	S85	Bornholmer Straße towards Grünau
Location

Berlin Wollankstraße (German: Bahnhof Wollankstraße) is a railway station in the Pankow district of Berlin, Germany. It is served by the Berlin S-Bahn and several local buses.

== History ==
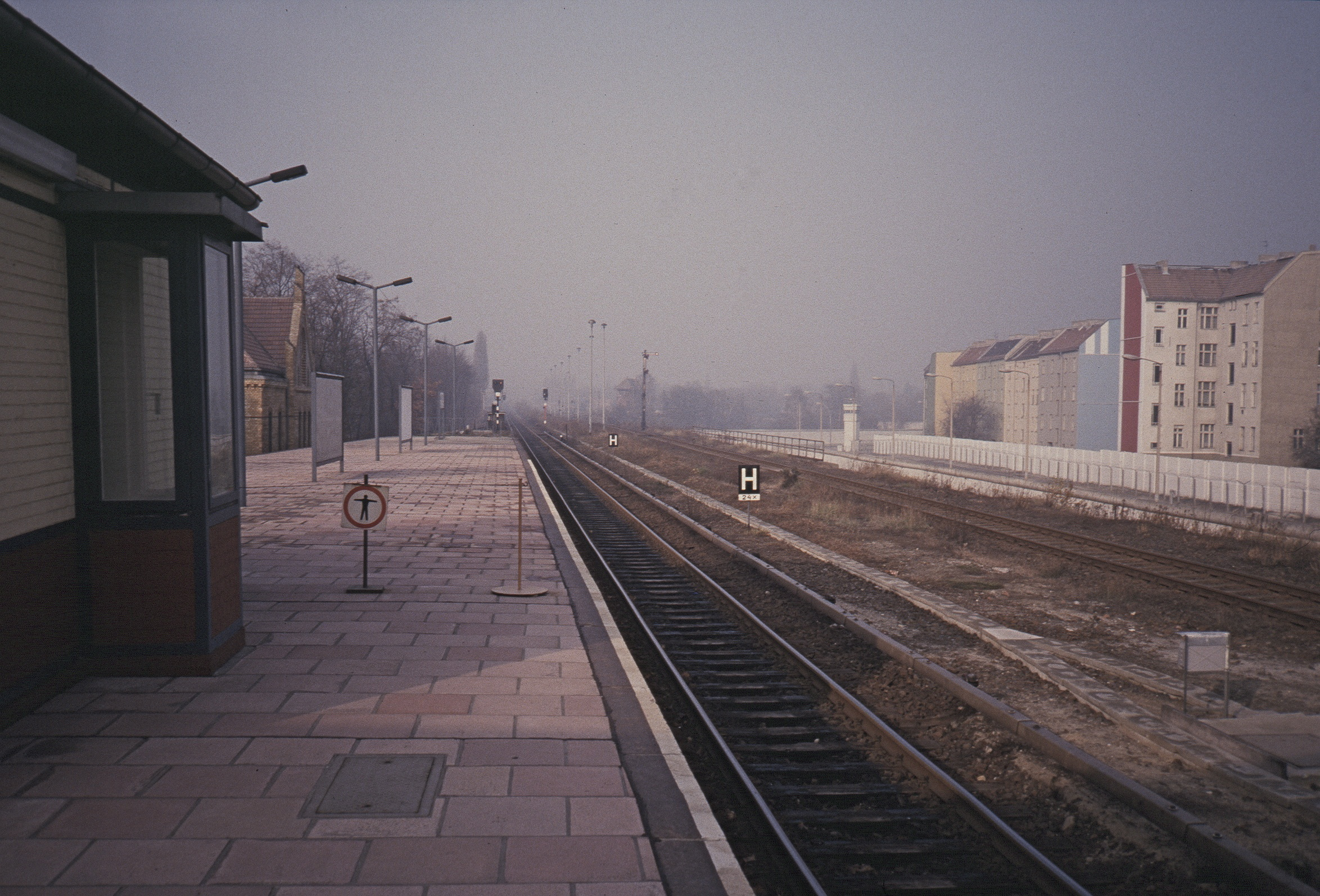
Berlin Wollankstraße station in November 1986 with the Berlin Wall at the right.

The station opened as Bahnhof Prinzenallee on 10 July 1877 at the Nordbahn (Berlin–Stralsund Northern railway) from Berlin to Neubrandenburg. In 1893 it received the name Pankow (Nordbahn), while the former Pankow railway station was called Pankow-Schönhausen. The Nordbahn line was connected to the S-Bahn system on 5 June 1925 and the station was renamed Wollankstraße on 3 October 1937.

After World War II traffic restarted first with steam on 11 June 1945. On 19 July 1945 the electric train service resumed. From 1945 the station was situated next to the border between East and West Berlin, on the east side, in Berlin's Pankow district. In 1961 the Berlin Wall was built just to the east of the station. The station remained in service within the West Berlin S-Bahn system, and could only be reached by passengers from the adjacent West Berlin locality of Gesundbrunnen (then part of Wedding borough). The entrances to the east remained bricked up until 1989. Nevertheless, during this period, the station was staffed and controlled by East German railway officials, and while the West Berlin S-Bahn trains were passing between Wollankstraße station and Friedrichstraße station, they were driven by an East German State railway driver who returned home to East Berlin every day. This was at a time when only the select few were allowed to exit East Germany. Friedrichstraße station was situated inside East Berlin, but the West Berlin S-Bahn service operating from that station was not accessible to East Berliners.

== In popular culture ==
The station features prominently in the 2011 thriller The Debt as a location along the border where an attempt is made to smuggle a Nazi war criminal from East Berlin to West Berlin. The film suggests that it would be possible to access a train stopped at the station from an adjacent property. In reality, the scenes depicted in the film could not have taken place, since the station is built on a viaduct and trains are elevated above street level.
