= Reinickendorf (locality) =

- Quarter of Berlin
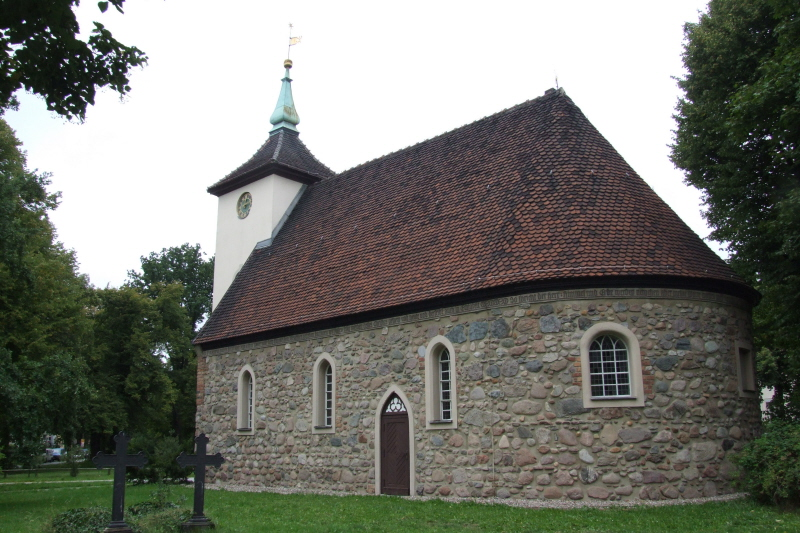
- Village church

- Location of Reinickendorf in Reinickendorf district and Berlin
- Interactive map of Reinickendorf
- Location within Germany Location within Berlin
- Coordinates: 52°34′00″N 13°20′00″E
- Country: Germany
- State: Berlin
- City: Berlin
- Borough: Reinickendorf
- Founded: 1230

Area
  - Total: 10.5 km^{2} (4.1 sq mi)
- Elevation: 52 m (171 ft)

Population (2024-12-31)
  - Total: 85,618
  - Density: 8,150/km^{2} (21,100/sq mi)
- Time zone: UTC+01:00 (CET)
  - Summer (DST): UTC+02:00 (CEST)
- Postal codes: 13403, 13407, 13409
- Vehicle registration: B

Reinickendorf (German pronunciation: [ˈʁaɪnɪkn̩ˌdɔʁf]) is a locality (Ortsteil) of Berlin in the borough (Bezirk) of Reinickendorf. It had a population of 83,972 in 2020.

== Geography ==
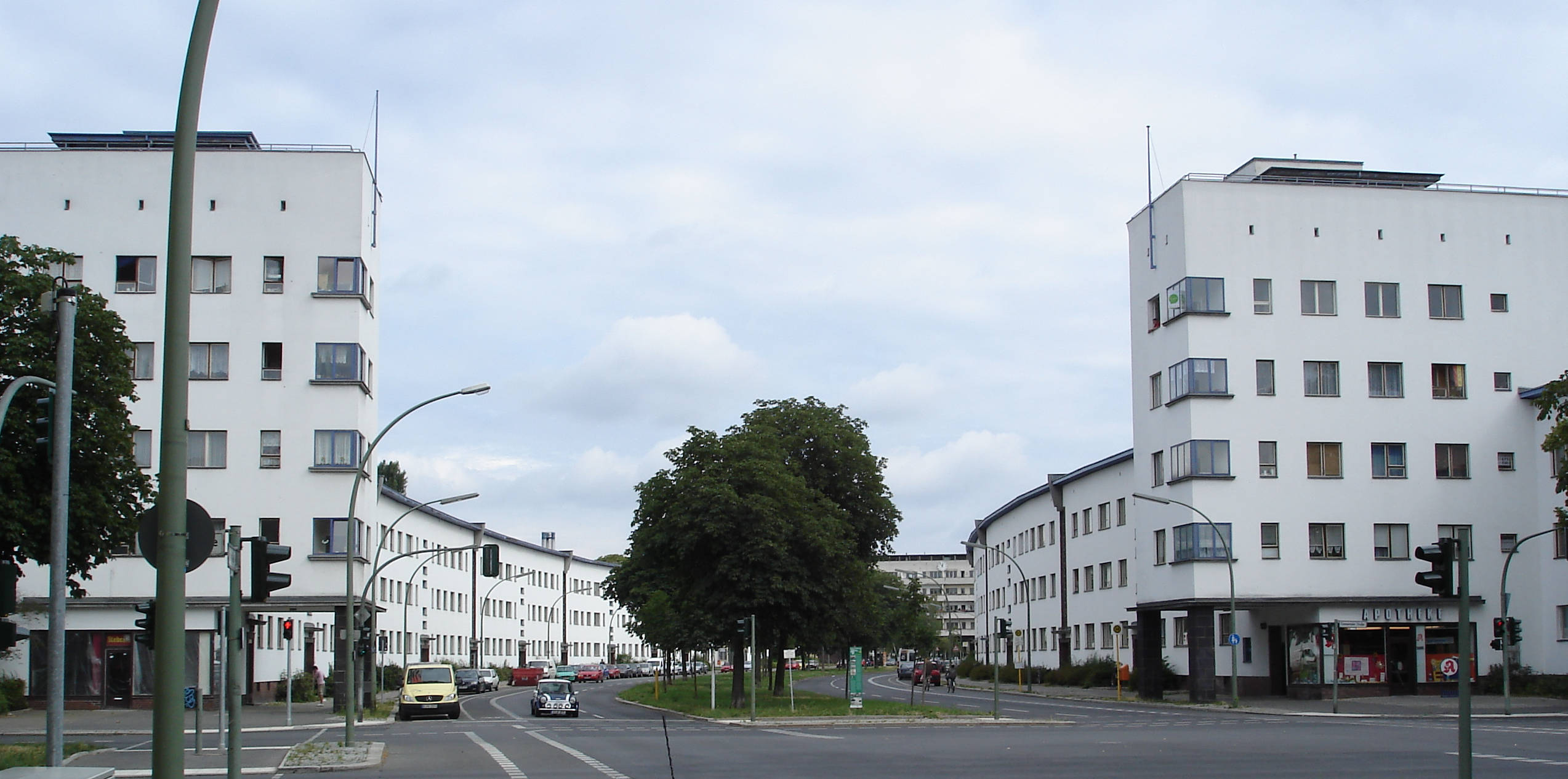
Weiße Stadt

The locality is situated in the south-western side of its district. It borders the localities of Tegel in the west, Wittenau and Borsigwalde in the north. To the east are Wilhelmsruh, Niederschönhausen and Pankow, all three in the Pankow borough, to the south Gesundbrunnen and Wedding, both in the borough of Mitte.

== History ==
The name of the former Reinickendorf village can be traced back to a peasant Reinhardt (Reineke in Low German), who settled here around 1230. The locality was first mentioned in a 1345 deed and acquired by the City of Berlin in 1397. The late 19th century saw a significant increase in population, when Reinickendorf received direct access to Berlin with the opening of the Nordbahn railway line to Neustrelitz in 1877.

Reinickendorf was incorporated into the City of Berlin by the 1920 Greater Berlin Act. In 1928, architect Otto Rudolf Salvisberg designed the Weiße Stadt (White City), part of the Berlin Modernist Housing Estates, a UNESCO World Heritage Site.

During World War II, Reinickendorf was the location of a subcamp of the Sachsenhausen concentration camp for Hungarian Jewish and Polish women.

Kriegsgräberstätte Reinickendorf is adjacent to the S-Bahn station and is accessed from Freitheitsweg or via a footpath on the south side of the station. In addition to one grave from 1919, inside the gate is a plot containing burials of military personnel and civilians from the Battle for Berlin and, in particular, 24 April 1945. Beyond this plot is another containing deaths occurring during the winter of 1945/46. To the west side are further immediate post-war civilian graves amounting to 500 burials. The total number of burials in the cemetery is around 2,370.

== Transportation ==
Reinickendorf is served by the Berlin S-Bahn lines S1, S25, S85 and by the U-Bahn line U8. The S-Bahn stations are Schönholz, Wilhelmsruh, Alt-Reinickendorf, Karl Bonhoeffer Nervenklinik and Eichborndamm. The U-Bahn stations are Rathaus Reinickendorf, Karl Bonhoeffer Nervenklinik, Lindauer Allee, Paracelsus Bad, Residenzstraße and Franz Neumann Platz.

== Photogallery ==
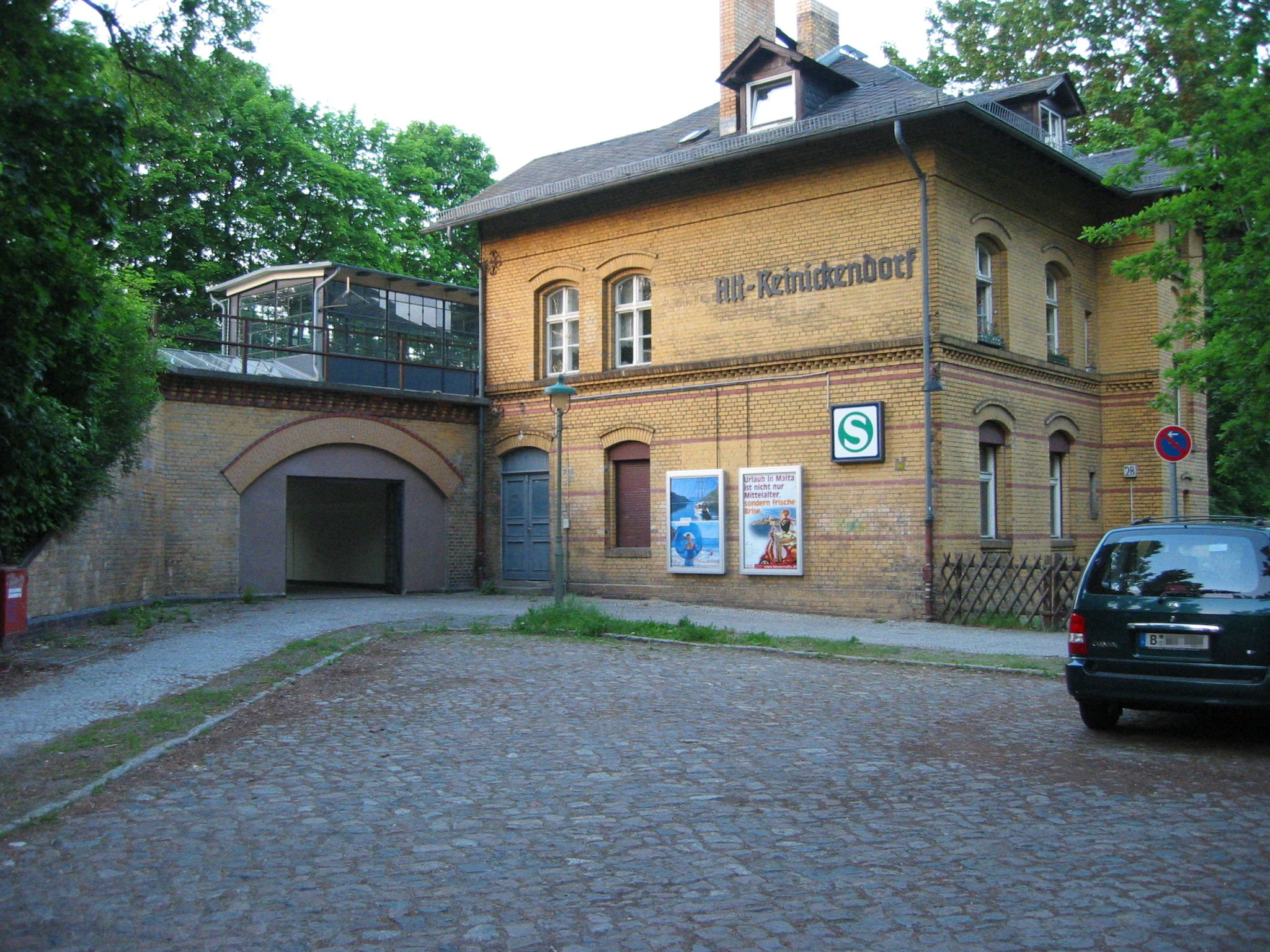
S-Bahn station Alt-Reinickendorf

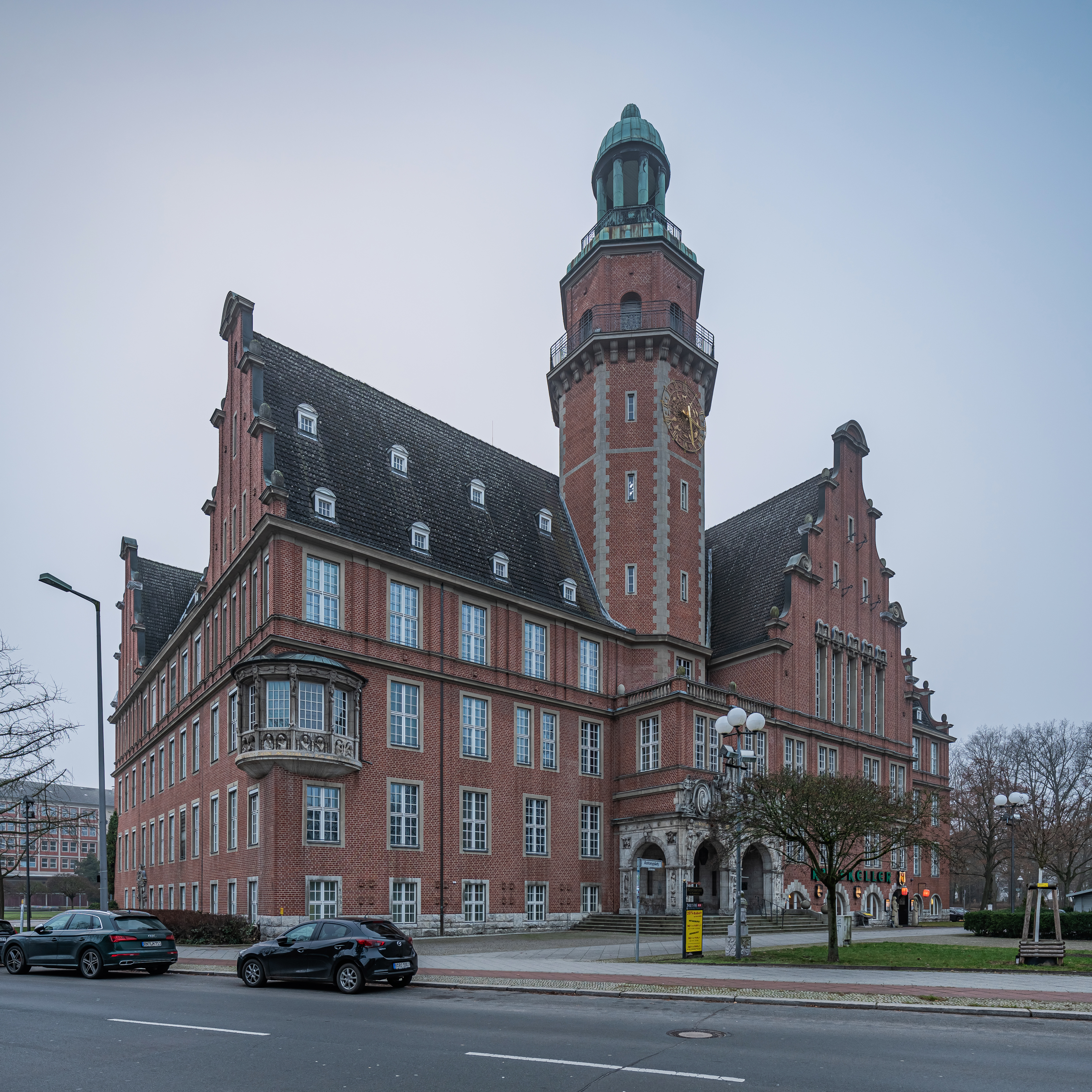
City hall

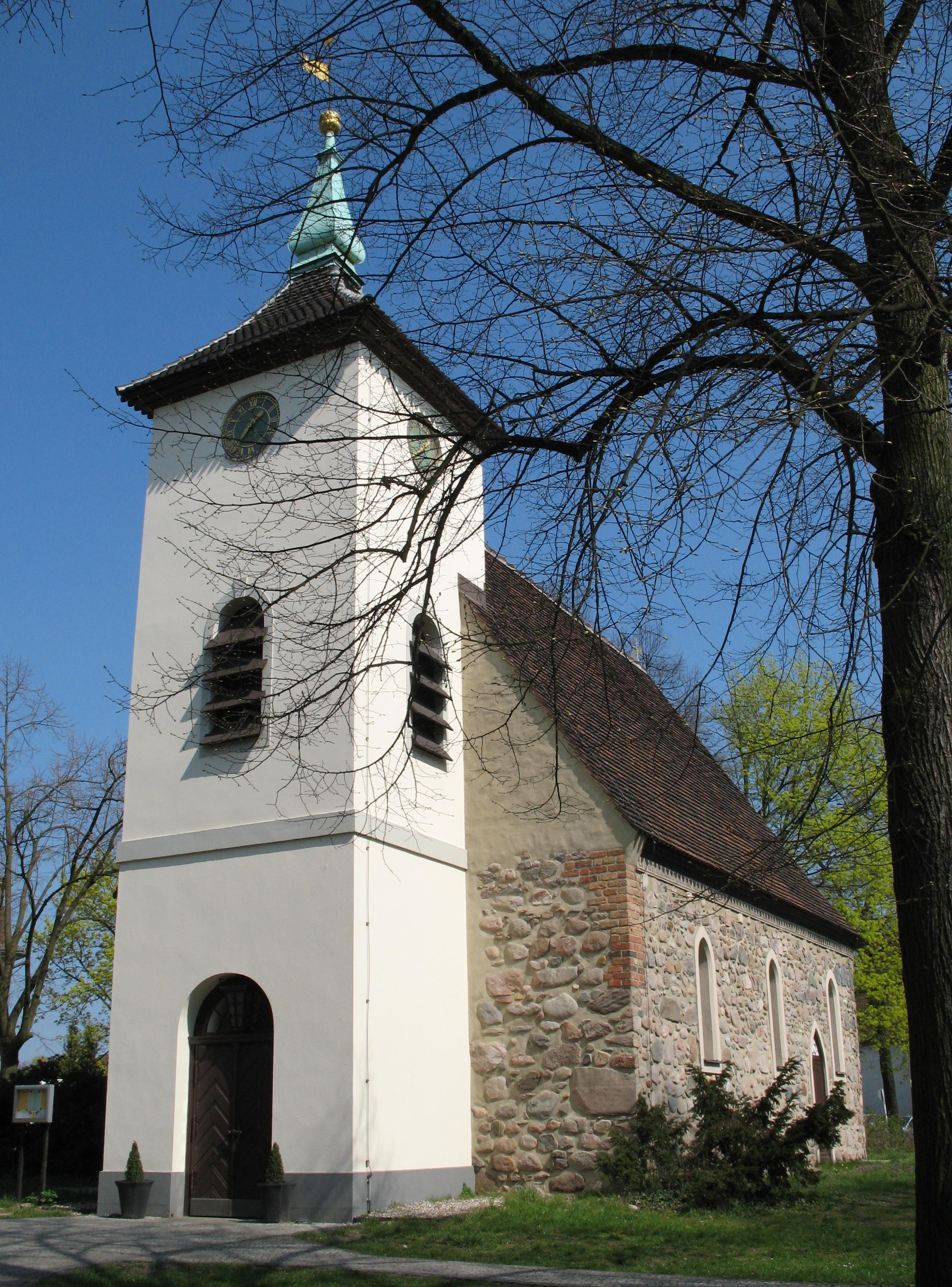
Church

== See also ==
- Berlin-Reinickendorf (electoral district)
- Berlin-Reinickendorf station
