= Berlin Bornholmer Straße station =

Railway station in Pankow, Germany

Coordinates: 52°33′16″N 13°23′53″E

Bornholmer Straße
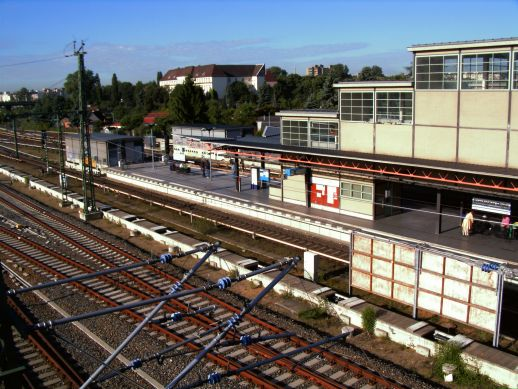
- 2006

General information
- Location: Prenzlauer Berg, Berlin, Berlin; Germany
- Owner: DB Netz
- Operator: DB Station&Service
- Lines: Berlin–Szczecin railway (KBS 200.2) (KBS 203) (KBS 205); Berlin Northern Railway (KBS 200.1) (KBS 200.25)
- Platforms: 2 island platforms
- Tracks: 4
- Connections: S1 S2 S25 S26 S8 S85

Other information
- Station code: 791
- DS100 code: BBOS
- IBNR: 8089008
- Category: 4
- Fare zone: : Berlin B/5656
- Website: www.bahnhof.de

History
- Opened: 1 October 1935; 90 years ago 22 December 1990; 35 years ago
- Closed: 13 August 1961; 65 years ago
- Electrified: at opening

Services
| Preceding station | Berlin S-Bahn | Following station |
|---|---|---|
| Wollankstraße towards Oranienburg | S1 | Gesundbrunnen towards Wannsee |
| Pankow towards Bernau | S2 | Gesundbrunnen towards Blankenfelde |
| Wollankstraße towards Hennigsdorf | S25 | Gesundbrunnen towards Teltow Stadt |
| Pankow towards Blankenburg | S26 | Gesundbrunnen towards Teltow Stadt |
| Pankow towards Birkenwerder | S8 | Schönhauser Allee towards Wildau |
| Wollankstraße towards Waidmannslust | S85 | Schönhauser Allee towards Grünau |
Route map
Location

Berlin Bornholmer Straße (German: Bahnhof Bornholmer Straße) is a railway station in the Prenzlauer Berg district of Berlin, Germany. It is served by the Berlin S-Bahn and the M13 and 50 lines of the Berlin Straßenbahn.

== History ==
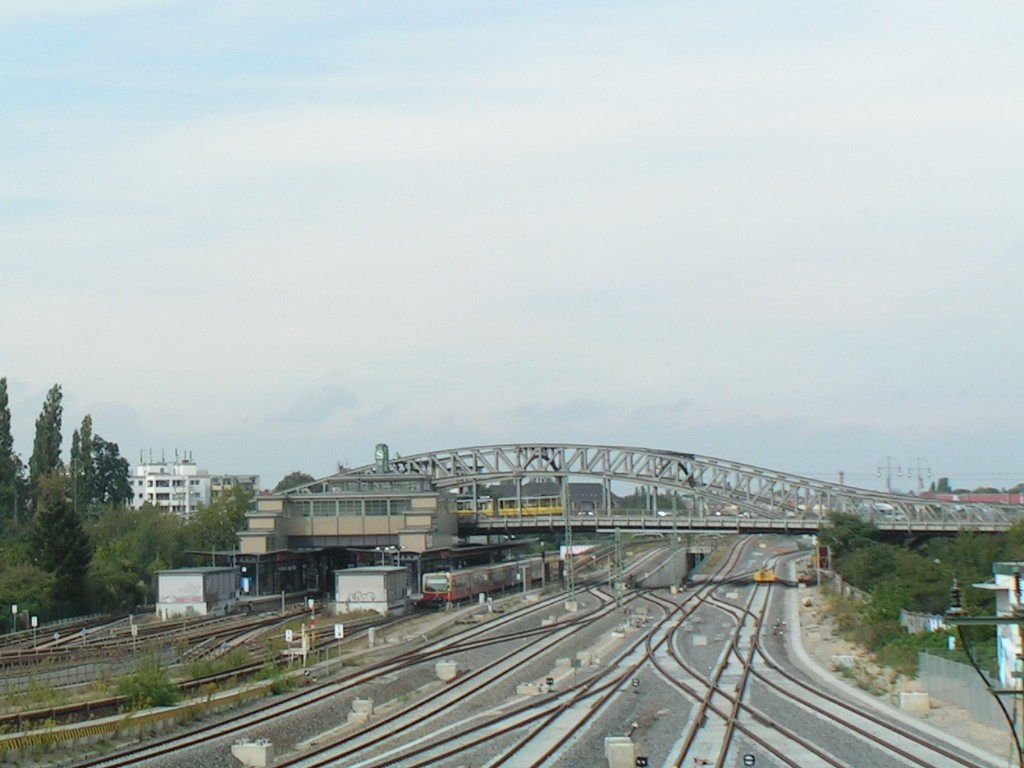
Bornholmer Straße station and Bösebrücke

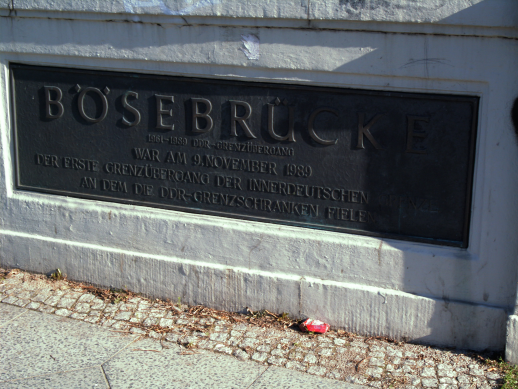
November 9, 1989 memorial plaque

The station opened on 1 October 1935 at the junction of the Nordbahn line from Berlin to Stralsund with the railway line to Szczecin (at that time part of Germany and called Stettin) where the eponymous street named after Bornholm Island crossed the tracks. As Bornholmer Straße station lay right at the border of West and East Berlin, a temporary connection was built on 25 December 1952 as a warning. It was closed on 13 August 1961 with the construction of the Berlin Wall, and the section to Pankow on the middle track was cut and locked with a gate, turning it into one of Berlin's ghost stations, passed by the western S-Bahn trains from Frohnau and Helligensee all the way to the Nord-Süd Tunnel. The eastern parts remained unused at that time, and train transport were extended from Schönhauser Allee to Bornholmer Straße, which was opened on 10 December 1961. It was also connected to Hohen Neuendorf from Blankenburg, where it was only a short connection from Hohen Neuendorf to Oranienburg, to provide connections from Oranienburg and Bernau to the East Berlin.

After the German reunification, Bornholmer Straße was reopened on 22 December 1990; the platforms for the former East Berlin site were opened on 5 August 1991. Since 1 December 1997 the connecting platforms in Bornholmer Straße have been reopened.

Though the station was closed the bridge (Bösebrücke) spanning over the tracks was the site of the Bornholmer Straße border crossing between Prenzlauer Berg and the West Berlin borough of Wedding established in 1961. In the evening of 9 November 1989 thousands of East Berliners and GDR citizens assembled at the bridge demanding entry to West Berlin. At 9:20 pm local guards were the first to open a checkpoint and allow people passing through freely to West Berlin, where they were greeted enthusiastically. The event marked the commencement of the fall of the Berlin Wall.

== Station layout ==
The station is spanned by the Bösebrücke. The station building is located on the street level as a rider station at street level. The bungalow building has a pentagonal superstructure and a small tower adorned with the suburban train symbol. The station is located near Baumschulenweg. The train station is close to the city centre. Today, the platform systems consist of two island platforms with four tracks, allowing for cross-platform transfers in the same direction. The western platform is located near the Szczecin railway near the ring road, in the opposite direction.

East of the S-Bahn track run the tracks of the mainline. There is no platform for the long-distance train in Bornholmer Straße. The facilities built by Richard Brademann reception (reception building and stair access) are now a listed building.
