= Berlin Alt-Reinickendorf station =

Railway station in Berlin, Germany

Berlin Alt-Reinickendorf
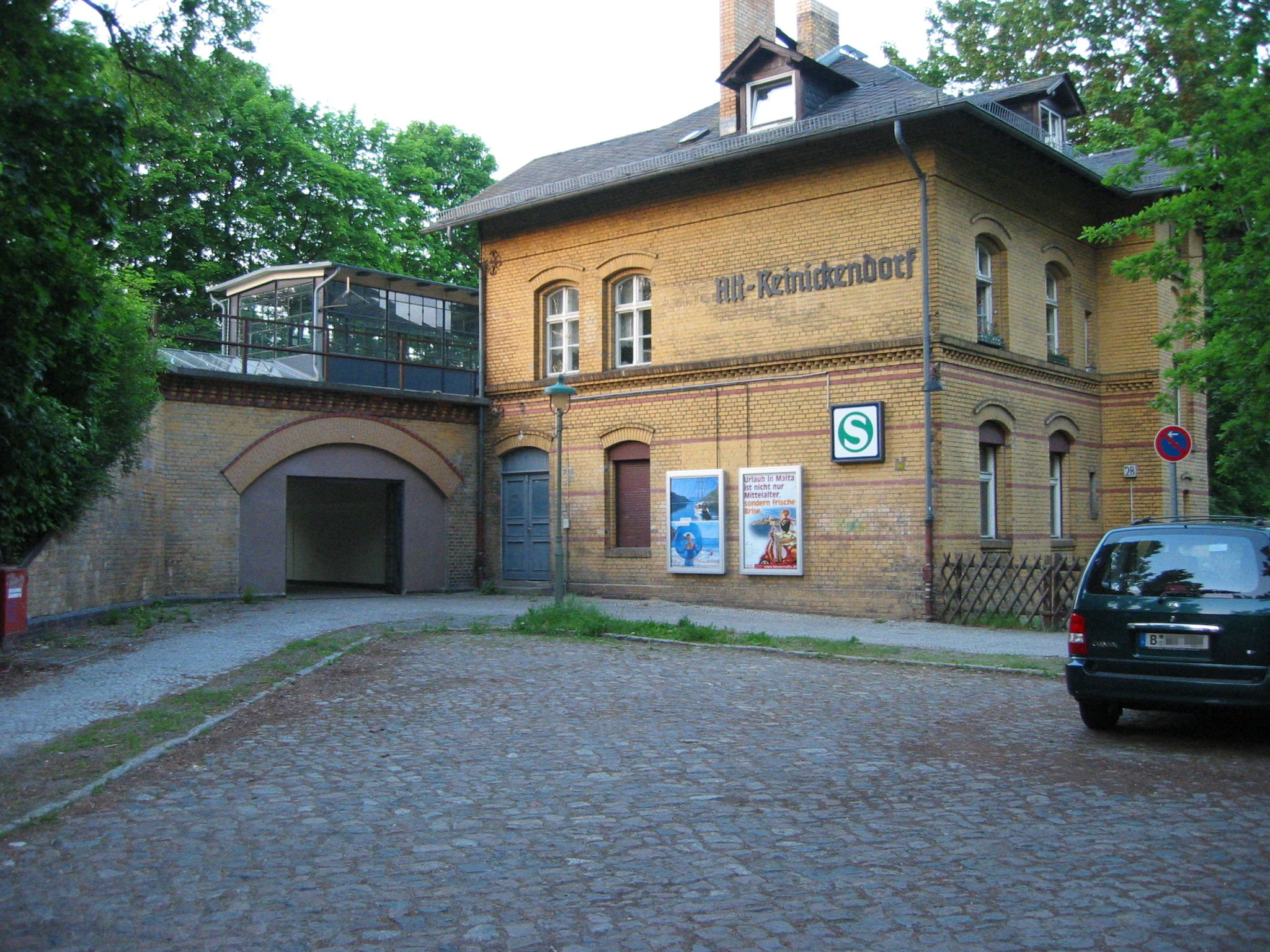
- Entrance building from 1893

General information
- Other names: Alt-Reinickendorf
- Location: Reinickendorf, Reinickendorf borough, Berlin; Germany
- Coordinates: 52.5779°N 13.3506°E
- Line: Kremmen Railway

Construction
- Accessible: Yes

Other information
- Station code: n/a
- DS100 code: BARF
- Category: 5
- Fare zone: : Berlin B/5656

History
- Opened: 1 October 1893; 132 years ago 28 May 1995; 31 years ago
- Closed: 9 January 1984; 42 years ago
- Electrified: 16 March 1927; 99 years ago
- Former names: 1893-1911 Reinickendorf (Dorf); 1911-1994 Reinickendorf

Key dates
- 1893: current building erected
- 1945, late April - 10 June: operation interrupted

Services
Preceding station	Berlin S-Bahn	Following station
Karl-Bonhoeffer-Nervenklinik towards Hennigsdorf	S25	Schönholz towards Teltow Stadt
Location

Berlin Alt-Reinickendorf is a railway station in the Reinickendorf district of Berlin. It is served by S-Bahn line S25. The station, located in the old town of the locality of Reinickendorf, was called Berlin-Reinickendorf until 1994.

== Sources ==
- Schwandl, R (2003). "Berlin S-Bahn Album".
