= Stellwerk Fichtengrund =

Coordinates: 52.7764°N 13.2535°E

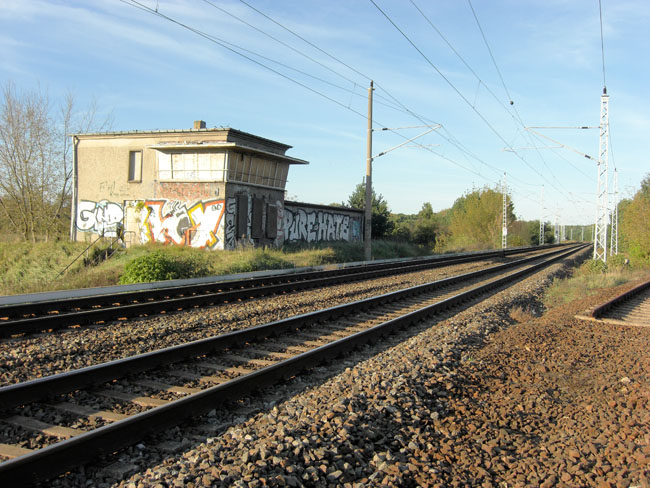

Stellwerk Fichtengrund is a decommissioned railway signal box on the outskirts of Berlin in Oranienburg, Germany, formerly in the GDR. It was built in 1964 by the GDR railway Deutsche Reichsbahn to operate the connection to, what was at the time, a secret rail track connecting the Prussian Northern Railway with the Heidekrautbahn. The track, which was omitted from maps during the GDR period, was used to test a new Telescopic Axle to allow train coaches to easily change from European to Russian track gauge. The prototype worked but was never put into mass production.

== Structure ==
The Stellwerk operated a type GS II DR point control system and the structure was designed by the building department of the Deutsche Reichsbahn. The building consists of a block containing the control centre with radial viewing windows and a separate part containing the electrical relay rooms. The construction of all walls, floors and roofs is predominantly from pre-cast or in-situ cast steel reinforced concrete with a rendered outer coating on the walls; building materials and method which were fashionable during that period in the GDR.

== Similar buildings ==
The Reichsbahn built several virtually identical buildings situated in Birkenwerder, Satzkorn, Hohen-Neuendorf-West and Schönfließ.

== Protected building status ==
On 20 March 2012 the exterior of the building was awarded protected building status – added to the "Denkmalliste des Landes Brandenburg".
