= Centre for Historical Research of the Polish Academy of Sciences in Berlin =

German-based Polish research institute

- Centrum Badań Historycznych Polskiej Akademii Nauk w Berlinie
- Other name: CBH PAN
- Type: Research institute
- Established: 2006
- Parent institution: Polish Academy of Sciences
- Director: Igor Kąkolewski
- Total staff: 10
- Location: Majakowskiring 47, Berlin, Germany
- Website: cbh.pan.pl/de

The Centre for Historical Research of the Polish Academy of Sciences in Berlin (Polish: Centrum Badań Historycznych Polskiej Akademii Nauk w Berlinie, abbreviated: CBH PAN; German: Zentrum für Historische Forschung Berlin der Polnischen Akademie der Wissenschaften) is a research institute of the Polish Academy of Sciences (PAN) based in Berlin, Germany. Established in 2006, it is one of six units of the PAN outside of Poland, along with centres in Brussels, Kyiv, Paris, Rome, and Vienna.

== Institutional profile ==
The CBH PAN is a centre for research on Polish–German relations in the context of European history and culture. It carries out scientific, didactic, and cultural projects, intended both for experts and the general audience, either independently or in collaboration with international partners. It disseminates the results of these projects through articles and books, conferences, seminars, exhibitions and online. The CBH PAN emphasizes interdisciplinary approach to the humanities and social sciences, such as history, art history, cultural studies, museology, political science, sociology, and cultural anthropology. It promotes the rapprochement between the Poles and the Germans through scientific diplomacy.

== History and main projects ==
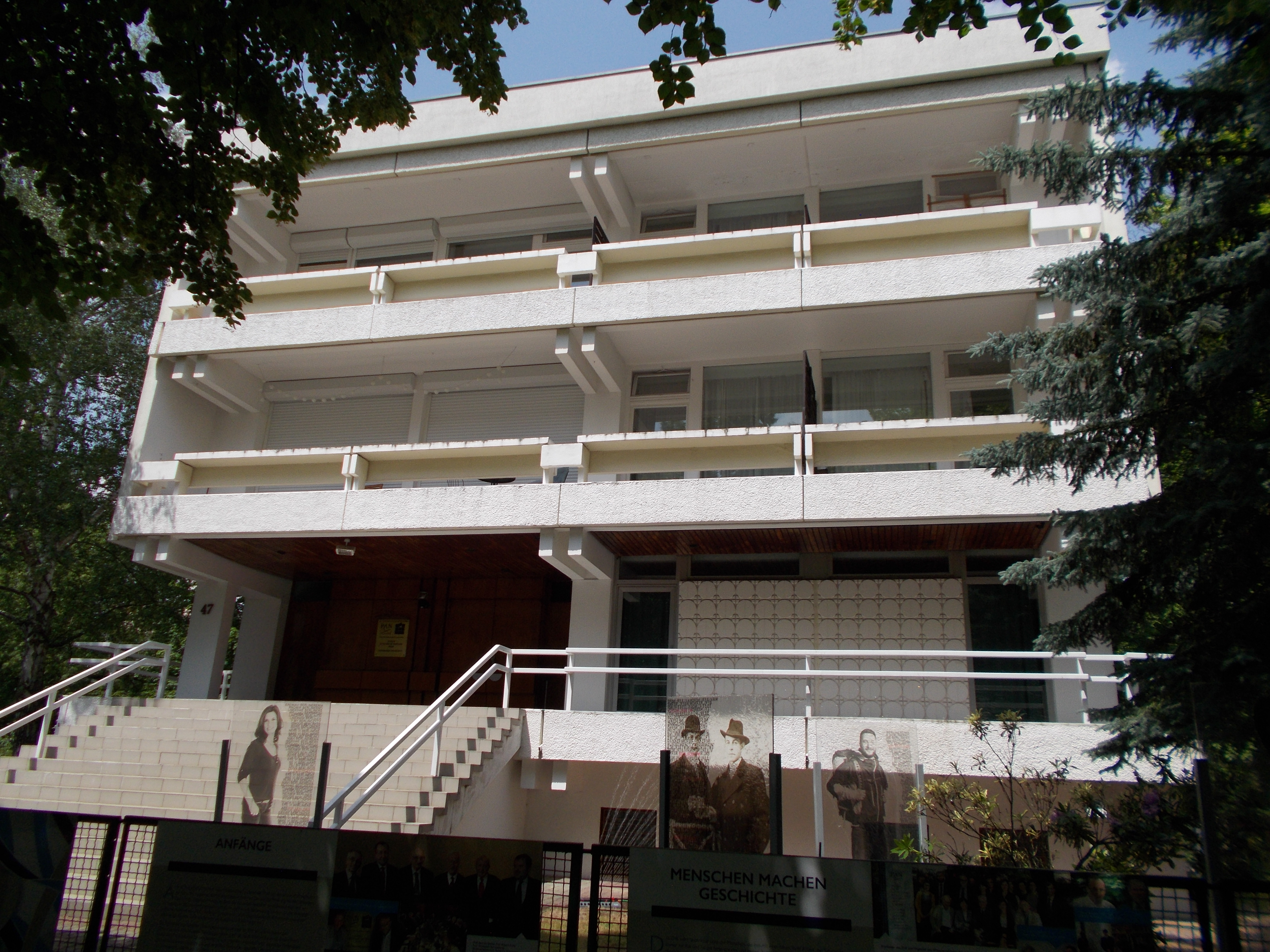
The building of the CBH PAN in Berlin

The CBH PAN was established thanks to the broader Polish–German scientific cooperation following the democratic transition in Poland after 1989, the reunification of Germany in 1989–1990, and the signing of the Polish-German treaty on good neighbourship in 1991. In 1999, the PAN opened a research station in Berlin, which was transformed in 2006 into the CBH PAN, and its main task was to research the Polish–German relations. The idea of the CBH PAN was modelled on the German Historical Institute in Warsaw.

Since its establishment, the CBH PAN has carried out multiple projects that consolidated its position in Berlin's scientific community (e.g., My Berlińczycy! Wir Berliner! Poles in the Development of Berlin, 2006–2009; Modi Memorandi: An Interdisciplinary Lexicon of Collective Memory, 2011–2014; Polish–German Memorials, 2012–2015; Unsettling Remembering and Social Cohesion in Transnational Europe (UNREST) under the European Union's Horizon 2020 programme, 2015–2019).

Since 2008, the CBH PAN together with the Polish Embassy in Berlin annually awards the Scholar Prize of the Ambassador of the Republic of Poland for the best doctoral and master theses written by students at German universities and devoted to Polish history and culture or to the Polish–German relations. In 2010, the CBH PAN launched the Klaus Zernack Colloquium series of open monthly seminars, with a different main theme each year.

The CBH PAN is a partner of the German–Polish Textbook Commission, with which it coordinated the development of the Polish and German versions of a school textbook Europa. Nasza historia/Europa – Unsere Geschichte (English: Europe: Our History, 2016–2020).

== Publications ==
Since 2007, the CBH PAN has been publishing its German-language annual Historie, devoted to the Polish–German interactions. It also runs four publishing series: Fokus. Neue Studien zur Geschichte Polens und Osteuropas (English: Focus. New Studies in the History of Poland and Eastern Europe) and Polen in Europa (English: Poland in Europe), both in collaboration with the Brill Schöningh publishing house; Przełomy i ludzie dialogu. Z historii polsko-niemieckiego porozumienia (English: Breakthroughs and People of Dialogue. From the History of Polish–German Agreement), published independently; as well as Materiały źródłowe i opracowania do dziejów stosunków polsko-niemieckich w epoce nowożytnej i XIX w. (English: Source Materials and Studies on German–Polish Relations in the Early Modern Period and in the 19th Century) in collaboration with the Museum of Polish History in Warsaw. Since 2017, the CBH PAN has participated content-wise in the publication of a four volume German-language academic textbook Polen in der europäischen Geschichte (English: Poland in European History), published by Hirsemann Verlag.

== CBHist. educational website ==
In 2022, the CBH PAN launched CBHist., an educational website promoting Polish history among international students and teachers. It delivers the content created and co-created by the staff of the CBH PAN, including e-books, podcasts, videos, compilations of historical sources and lesson plans for the teaching of history.

== Library ==
The CBH PAN maintains a library of approximately 12,000 books and periodicals on Polish and German history. The library catalogue is linked to the Polish MAK+ and German KOBV library systems.

== Directors ==
- 2006–2018: Robert Traba
- since 2018: Igor Kąkolewski
