= Berlin-Schönholz station =

Railway station in Berlin, Germany

Coordinates: 52.5714°N 13.3811°E

Berlin-Schönholz
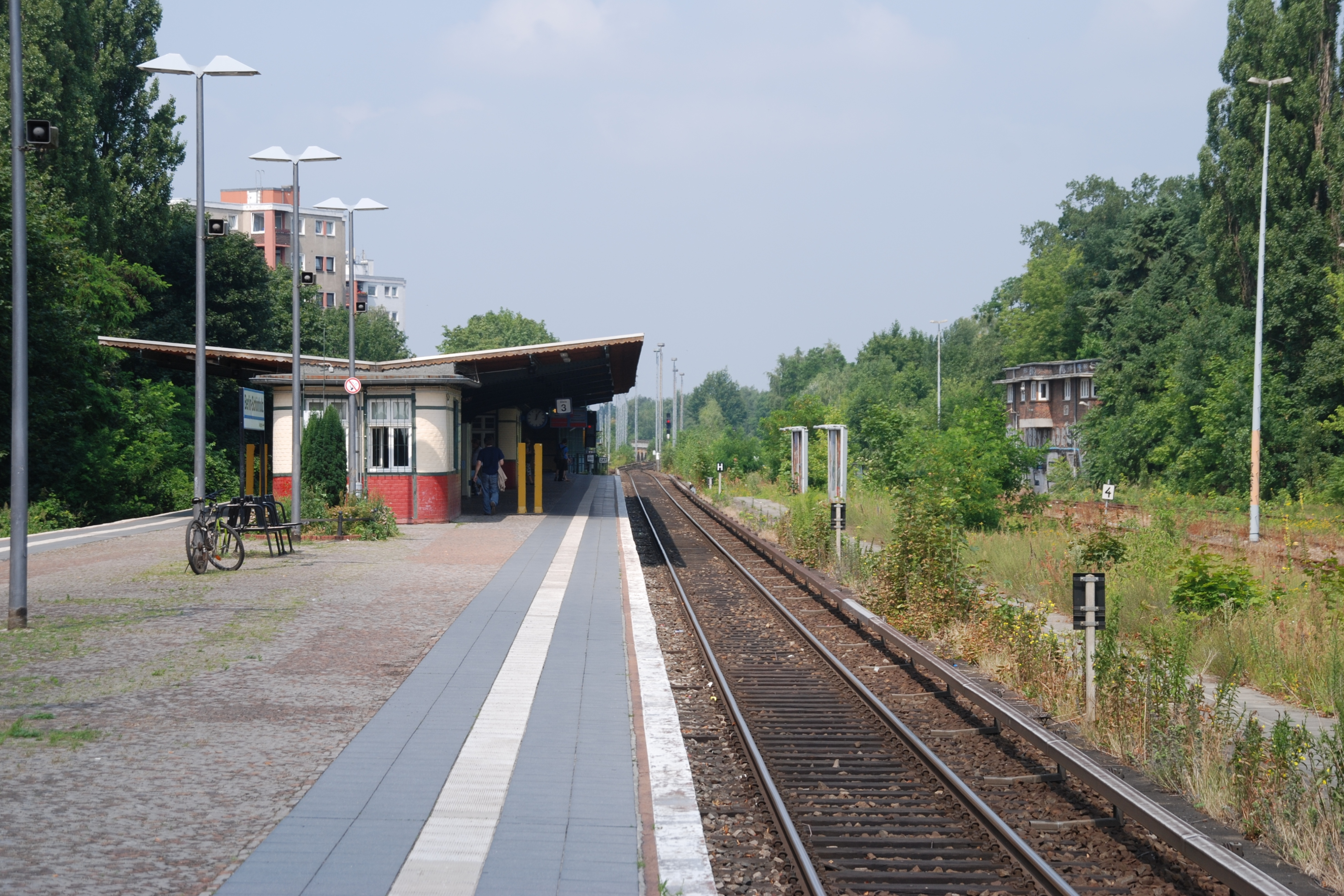
- Platform

General information
- Location: Reinickendorf, Reinickendorf borough, Berlin; Germany
- Lines: Northern Railway; Kremmen Railway

Other information
- Station code: 0560
- DS100 code: BSNL
- Category: 4
- Fare zone: : Berlin B/5656

History
- Opened: 10 July 1877; 149 years ago
- Electrified: 5 June 1925; 101 years ago
- Former names: 1877-1878 Reinickendorf; 1878-1884 Schönholz (Reinickendorf); 1884-1938 Schönholz-Reinickendorf

Key dates
- 1903: Opened
- Late April - 10 June 1945: Operation interrupted
- 9 January 1984: Closed
- 1 October 1984: Reopened

Services
Preceding station	Berlin S-Bahn	Following station
Wilhelmsruh towards Oranienburg	S1	Wollankstraße towards Wannsee
Alt-Reinickendorf towards Hennigsdorf	S25	Wollankstraße towards Teltow Stadt
Wilhelmsruh towards Waidmannslust	S85	Wollankstraße towards Grünau
Location

Berlin-Schönholz railway station (German: Bahnhof Berlin-Schönholz) is a railway station in Berlin, Germany. It is located on the Berlin Northern Railway (Berliner Nordbahn) line in the district of Reinickendorf, though it is named after the adjacent Schönholz quarter of the neighbouring Pankow district. From here, the Kremmen Railway branch line leads to Hennigsdorf and Kremmen. The station is served by S-Bahn trains and local bus lines, and is protected as a listed monument.

== History ==
When the station opened on 10 July 1877 with the name Reinickendorf, it initially only had one outdoor platform. In 1878 the station was renamed Schönholz (Reinickendorf) and, in 1884, it was again renamed, this time to Schönholz-Reinickendorf. The single outer platform was replaced by a central platform in 1893. Simultaneously, the Kremmen Railway was opened, making the station a transfer station. A reception building was added in 1896.

Between 1901 and 1903, the station was rebuilt to make way for a new road. During that time, new tracks were built for the Northern Railway, separating it from the Kremmen Railway. Subsequently the station was only serviced by suburban trains.

From 5 June 1925, the first electric trains operated on this route. As a result, the station became an S-Bahn station. The Kremmen Railway was electrified two years later, and mixed operation with steam locomotives came to an end.

In May 1938, the station was renamed Berlin-Schönholz. In 1945, there was no traffic for several weeks due to the ongoing war.

On 9 January 1984 management of the West Berlin S-Bahn was transferred from the Deutsche Reichsbahn to the BVG. Both routes using the station were shut down and the station was closed. It was reopened on 1 October 1984 to serve the route to Frohnau. In 1995, the Kremmen Railway was also reopened, initially only to Tegel, and since 1998 also to Hennigsdorf.

== Services ==
The station is serviced by the suburban train lines S1, S25 and S85, as well as the bus lines 150, 327 and N52.
