= Ossietzkystraße =

Street in Berlin, Germany

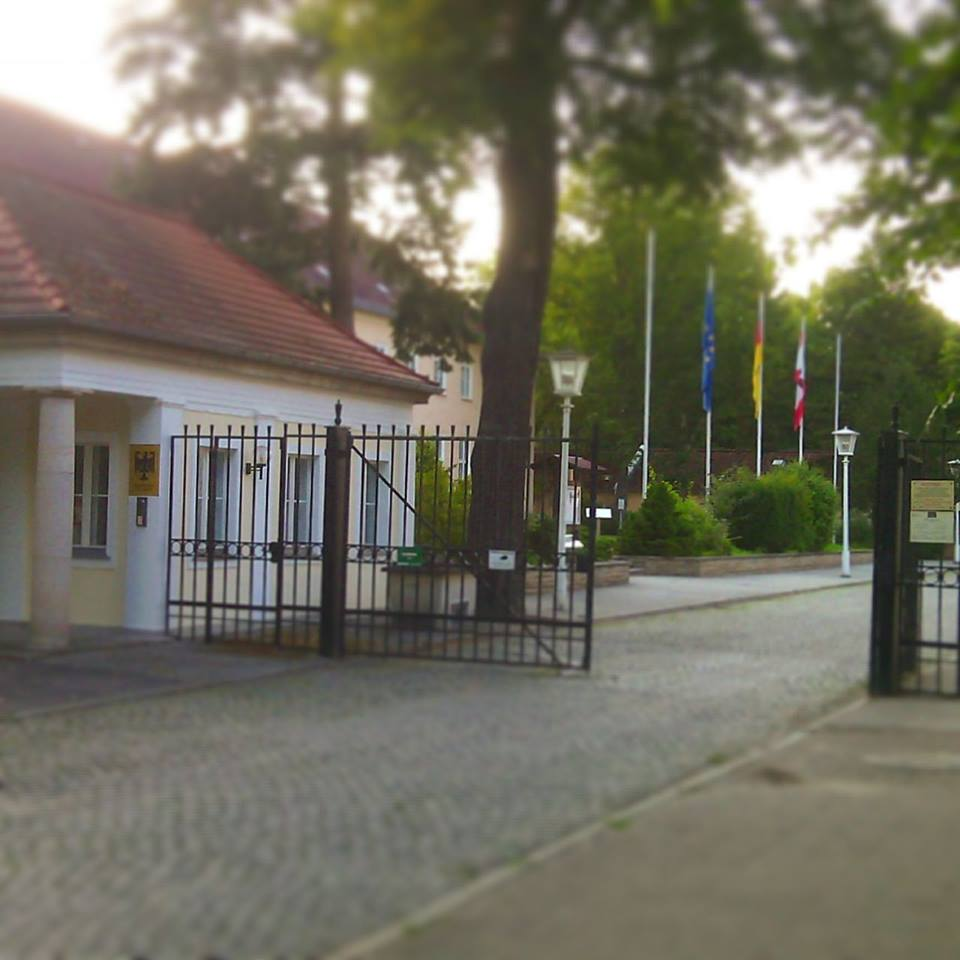
Ossietzkystraße, August 2015

Ossietzkystraße, also known as Carl-von-Ossietzky-Straße, is a street in the Pankow borough of Berlin. It is located between the Schlosspark and the Berliner Straße. In the street there is a statue of Carl von Ossietzky, after whom the street is named. The street, formerly known as Schloßstraße, was renamed after Carl von Ossietzky on 25 May 1948. In the street there is a statue of Carl von Ossietzky, after whom the street is named.
