= S1 (Berlin) =

Railway line in Berlin, Germany

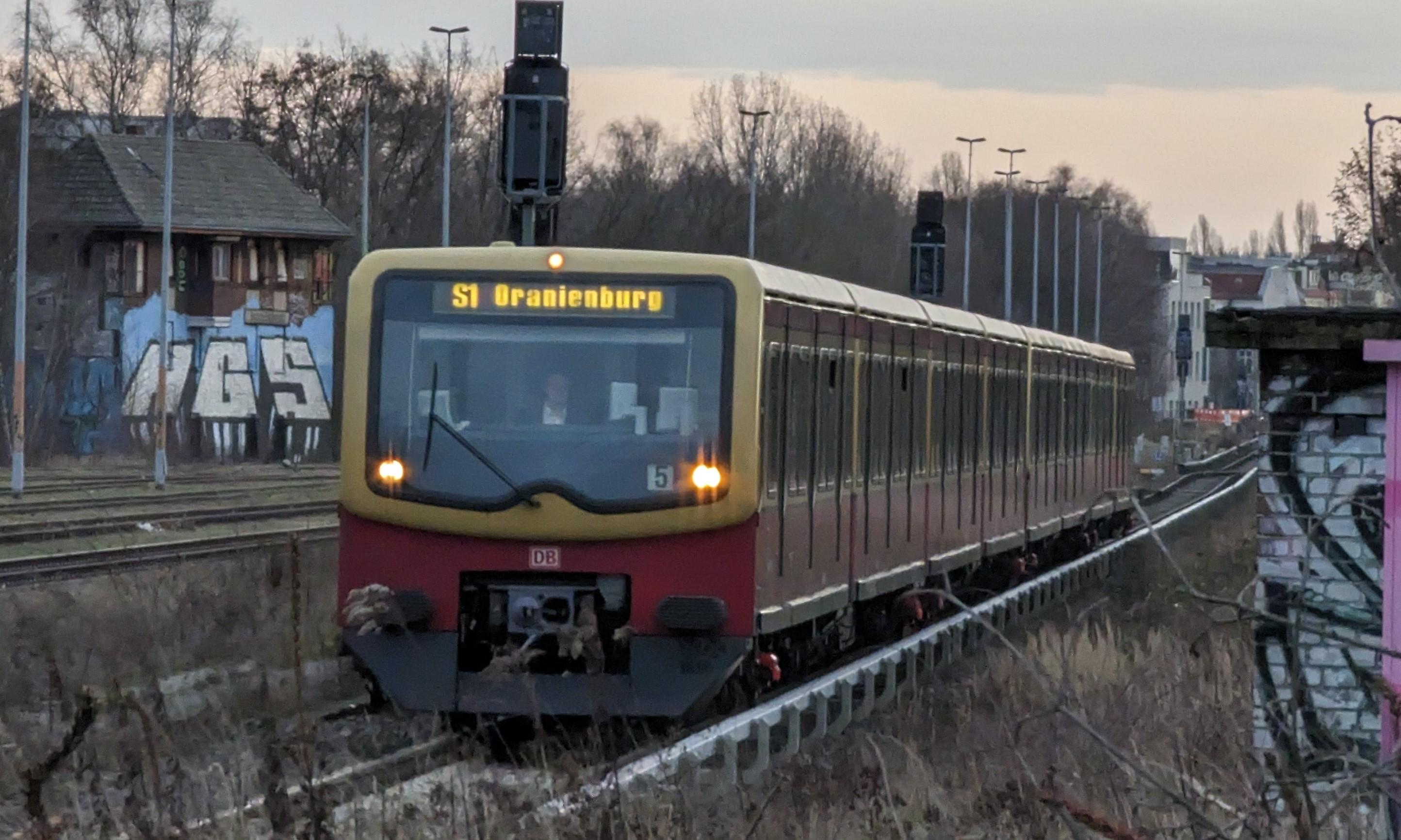
- S1 service arrives at Schönholz in 2023

Overview
- Locale: Berlin
- First service: 1 May 1985
- Current operator(s): S-Bahn Berlin GmbH

Route
- Termini: Wannsee; Oranienburg
- Line(s) used: Wannsee Railway; Berlin Nord-Süd Tunnel; Berlin–Szczecin railway; Berlin Northern Railway

Technical
- Rolling stock: DBAG Class 481

The S1 is a railway service of the Berlin S-Bahn that operates between Wannsee and Oranienburg.

== Operations ==
The southern end of the line is at Wannsee, on the Wannsee Railway. Trains run north over that line to Anhalter Bahnhof where they enter the Berlin Nord-Süd Tunnel, exiting at Berlin Nordbahnhof. Between Berlin Nordbahnhof and Bornholmer Straße trains use the Berlin-Szczecin railway. Finally, trains use the southern end of the Berlin Northern Railway between Bornholmer Straße and Oranienburg.

As of the December 2023 timetable change, the S1 operates every 10 minutes between Wannsee and Frohnau and every 20 minutes between Frohnau and Oranienburg.

Since becoming a numbered route in 1984, the S1's line colour is pink.

== Service history ==
The S1 was created along with the S2 and S3 on 9 January 1984, when the Berliner Verkehrsbetriebe (BVG) took over the S-Bahn network from the East German Deutsche Reichsbahn in West Berlin: however, the dilapidated state of the West Berlin network at the time meant that the first S1 trains did not run until 1 May 1985, when the line between Wannsee and Anhalter Bahnhof reopened.

In 1990, the S1 was extended to Frohnau, while the S2 was curtailed to Gesundbrunnen. It was extended to its present northern terminus of Oranienburg on 31 May 1992, after the reopening of the Berlin Northern Railway between Frohnau and Hohen Neuendorf.
