= Berlin Northern Railway =

Railway line in Germany

Berlin Northern Railway Berlin–Neubrandenburg–Stralsund
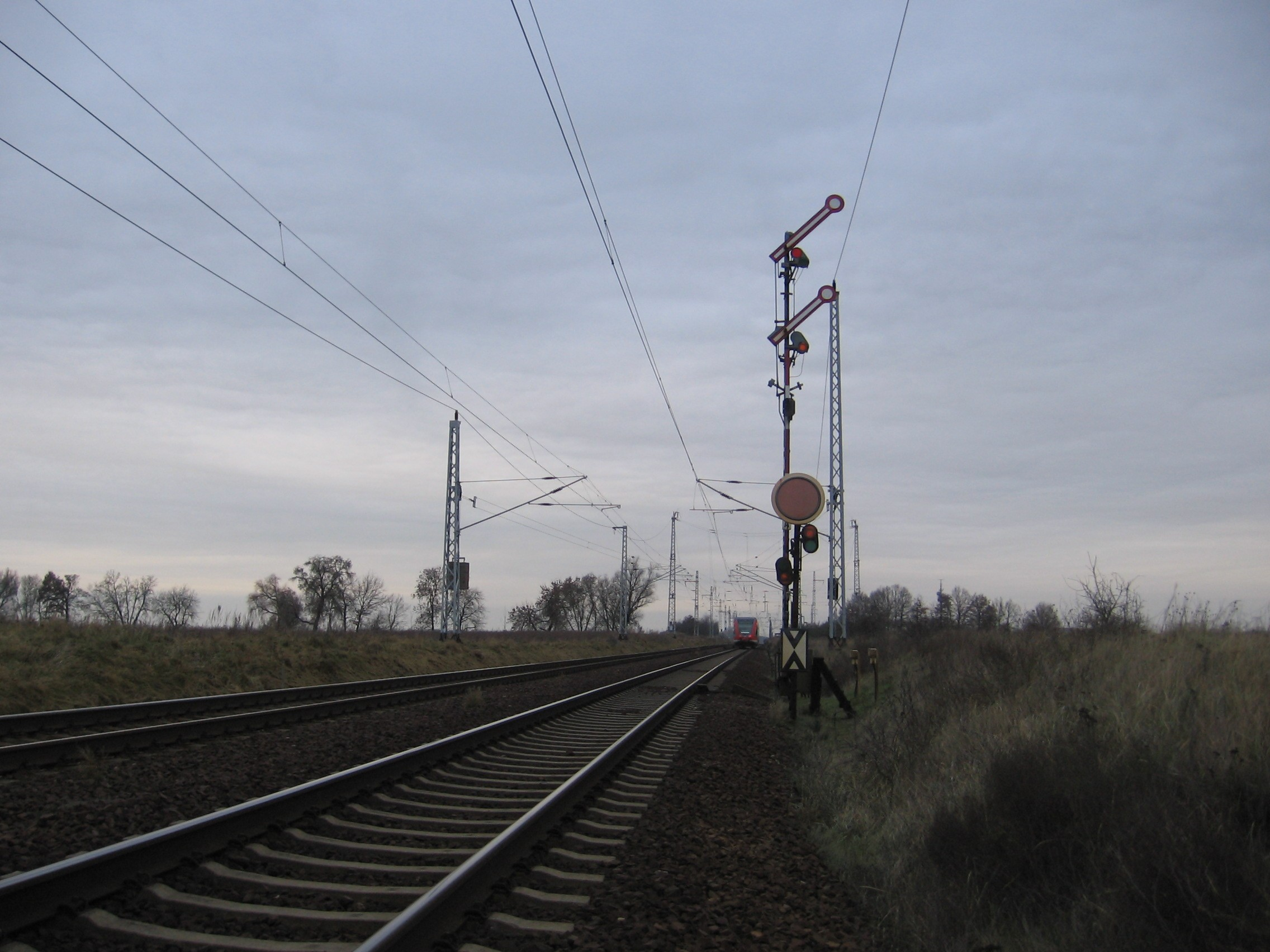
- Looking south from Löwenberg station

Overview
- Native name: Berliner Nordbahn
- Line number: 6088; 6030 S-Bahn to Oranienburg
- Locale: Berlin, Brandenburg and Mecklenburg-Vorpommern, Germany

Service
- Route number: 200.1, 200.85, 205, 209.12

Technical
- Line length: 222.6 km (138.3 mi)
- Track gauge: 1,435 mm (4 ft 8 1/2 in) standard gauge
- Electrification: 15 kV/16.7 Hz AC overhead; 750 V DC third rail (S-Bahn: Berlin–Oranienburg)
- Operating speed: 120 km/h (74.6 mph) (Birkenwerder-Nassenheide); 160 km/h (99.4 mph) (Nassenheide-Neustrelitz); 100 km/h (62.1 mph) (otherwise)
Route map
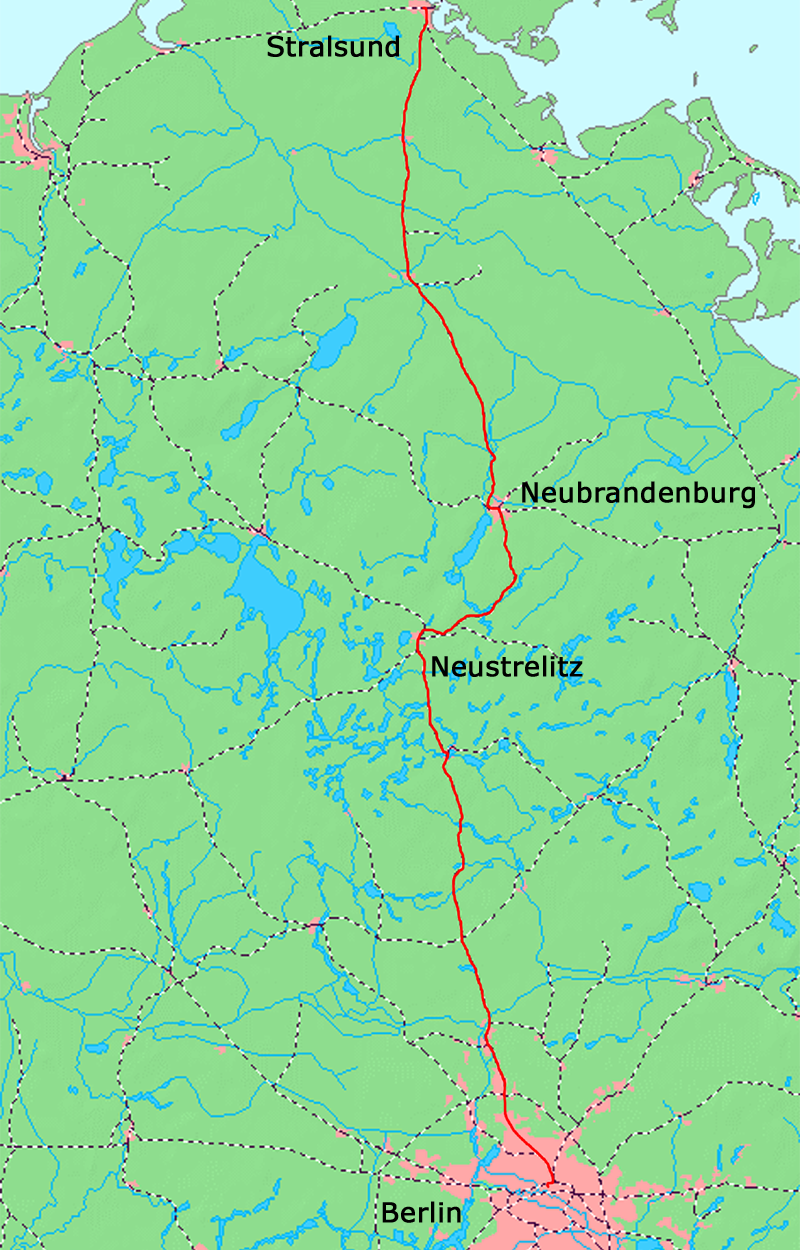
- Source: German railway atlas

The Berlin Northern Railway (German: Berliner Nordbahn) is a 223-kilometre-long main line route, that runs from Berlin via Neustrelitz and Neubrandenburg to Stralsund on the Baltic Sea coast. Nowadays, long-distance and regional traffic on the Nordbahn is routed at Hohen Neuendorf onto the Berlin Outer Ring to the Karower Kreuz and on to Berlin Main Station or Berlin-Lichtenberg.

== History ==
Construction of the line was preceded by decades of planning from 1843 until 1870 when the newly founded Berlin Northern Railway Company (German: Berliner Nord-Eisenbahn-Gesellschaft) gained the concessions from the states of Prussia and Mecklenburg-Strelitz. For financial reasons, the company was dissolved on 15 December 1875. The Prussian government acquired the unfinished railway and handed over further construction of it to the Lower Silesian-Markish Railway (Niederschlesisch-Märkische Eisenbahn). The opening took place in three stages:

- 10 July 1877: Berlin–Oranienburg–Neustrelitz–Neubrandenburg (134 km)
- 1 December 1877: Neubrandenburg–Demmin (42 km)
- 1 January 1878: Demmin–Stralsund (47 km)

The construction of the Northern Railway had a significant impact on the villages to the north of Berlin that were in the catchment area of the railway line. In some cases their population multiplied in the following decades. The term Nordbahn became part of place-names (for instance, Glienicke/Nordbahn) and newspapers used its name (Nordbahn-Nachrichten).

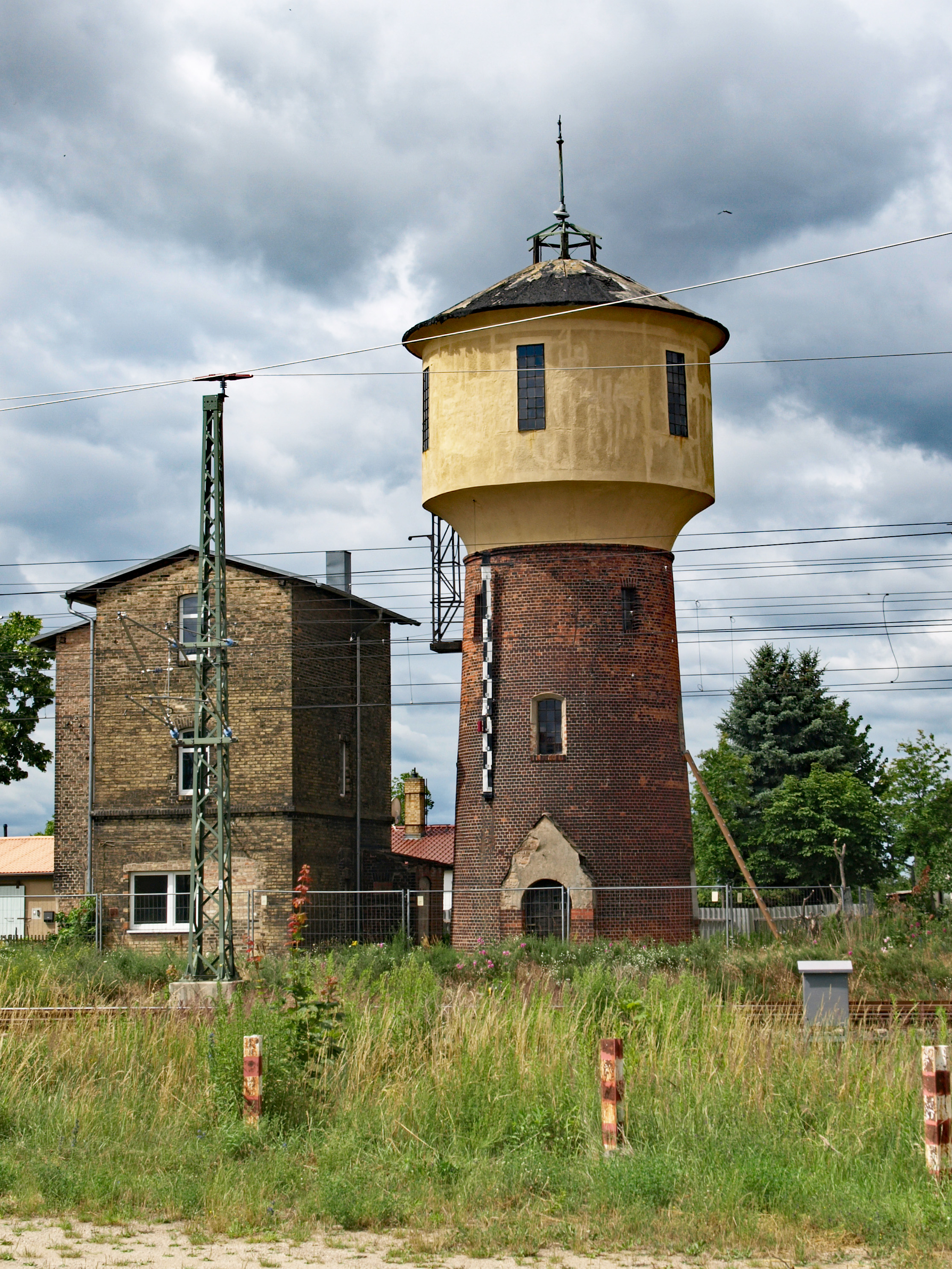
Water tower at Löwenberg station

The Berlin terminus of the railway, but only for freight, was the first freight yard at Eberswalder Straße, now the site of Mauerpark. Passenger services began at the original Nordbahnhof (North Station) in Pankow, today's Wollankstraße station, still evident in the design of the station and its forecourt. At the end of the 19th century the terminus of the railway or passenger trains for Berlin regional services was relocated to the Stettiner Bahnhof (Stettin—now Szczecin—station), built on Invalidenstraße; the freight remained at Eberswalder Straße.

Up to 1912 separate suburban tracks were built next to the long distance tracks between Gesundbrunnen and Frohnau. At the same time the line was moved to an embankment, to eliminate level crossings. In 1926, the section from Frohnau to Borgsdorf was treated similarly.

In 1925 the suburban services were electrified on the DC system on the section from Gesundbrunnen to Oranienburg. The route later became part of the Berlin S-Bahn. In 1950 the Stettiner Bahnhof was renamed the Nordbahnhof. Electrical operations continued until the building of the Berlin Wall on 13 August 1961, when the line between Frohnau and Hohen Neuendorf was closed. The Berlin section of the Northern Railway had already been closed for mainline traffic to Nordbahnhof on 18 May 1952.

Immediately after the wall was built, the S-Bahn between Oranienburg and Hohen Neuendorf became an isolated operation. Subsequently, S-Bahn tracks were built and electrified along the Berlin outer ring between Hohen Neuendorf and Blankenburg. This line was connected in November 1961 to the main S-Bahn network. In Berlin, S-Bahn services continued to Frohnau until the handover of operating rights of the S-Bahn in West Berlin from the East German Railways to the BVG on 9 January 1984. Services were first closed and only resumed on 1 October 1984. Rehabilitation carried out on the S-train tracks in 1985 placed them on a track profile that would make the restoration of the old main line for long distance traffic difficult.

After the reunification, many of the smaller stops were however closed (Düsterförde (1996), Strelitz Alt (1995), Neddemin, Randow, Toitz-Rustow.

In 1992, the gap between Frohnau and Hohen Neuendorf was reopened so that continuous S-Bahn services could resume on the Northern Railway to Oranienburg.

In the long term, the recommissioning of the direct route from Berlin to Birkenwerder is planned. For this purpose, the long-distance railway tracks of the northern railway between the station Berlin-Gesundbrunnen and Birkenwerder on a length of 18.8 kilometres are to be rebuilt with two tracks with a line speed of 160 km/h, but no date has been set for this.

== See also ==
- Stellwerk Fichtengrund
