= List of railway stations in the Berlin area =

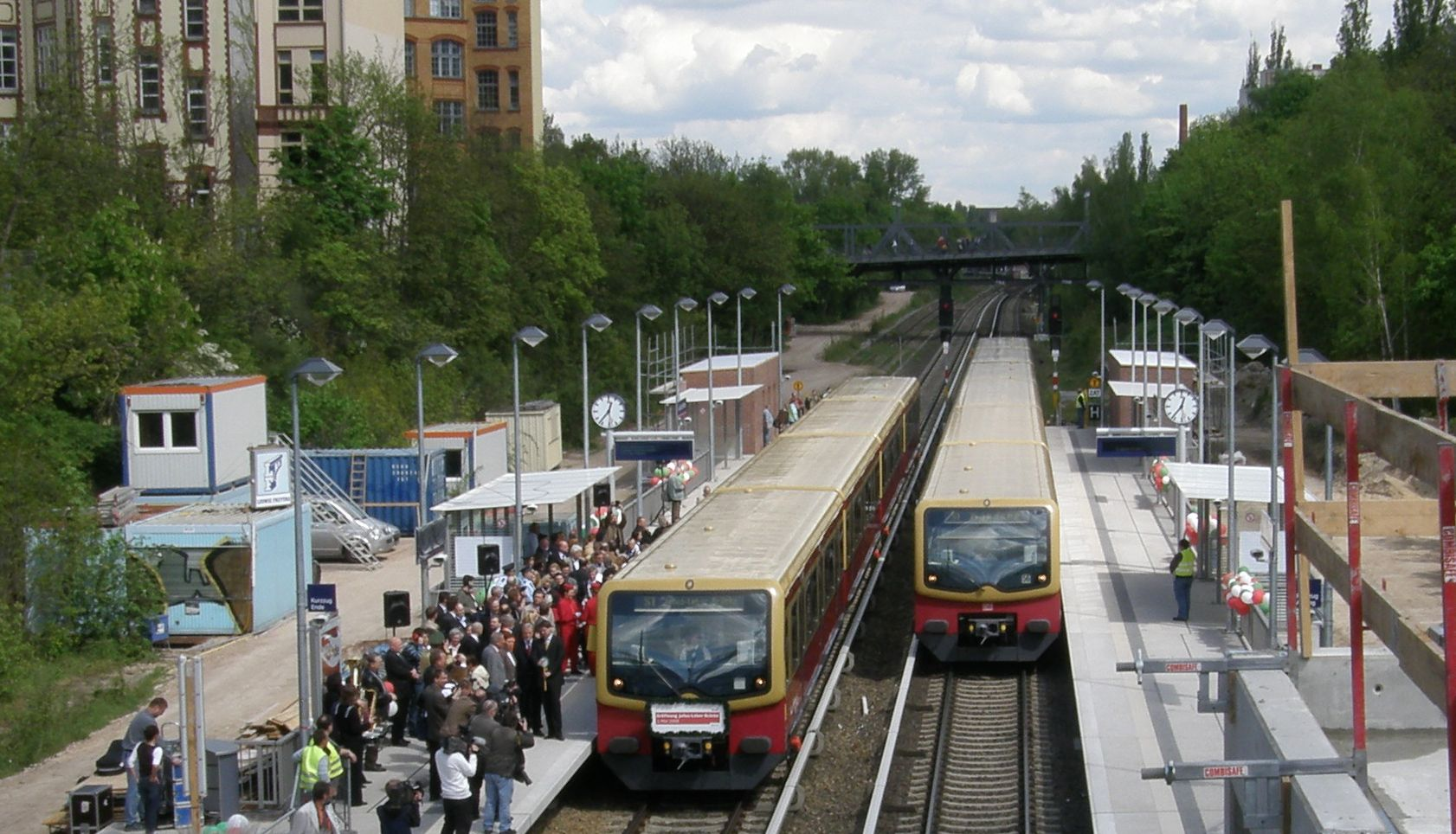
New: The Berlin S-Bahn station, Julius-Leber-Brücke, opened in 2008

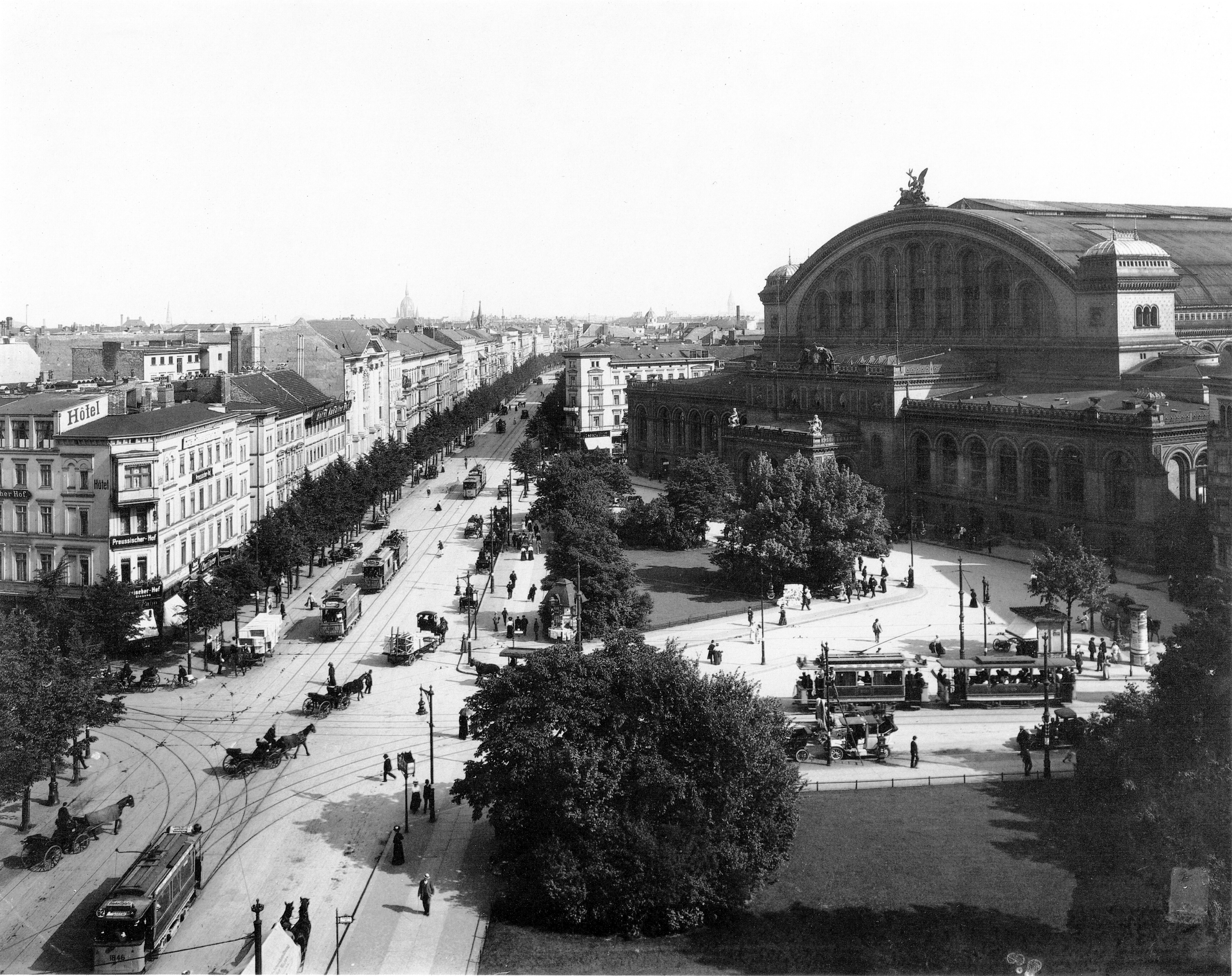
Old: Berlin's Anhalter Bahnhof destroyed in the Second World War

This list covers the railway stations in the Berlin area. These include both passenger stations and marshalling yards, but not goods stations. Because the Berlin S-Bahn network has expanded to include stations in the state of Brandenburg, the table shows only those stations lying within the Verkehrsverbund Berlin-Brandenburg's present-day Berlin ABC fare zones (i.e. those up to about 15 kilometres from the Berlin city boundary), and those formerly served by Berlin's suburban services. The latter ran out beyond the capital's boundaries to the next largest towns along the main and branch lines.

The farthest towns on the lines covered here are listed below:

Rüdnitz (Stettin Railway) – Werneuchen (Wriezen Railway) – Strausberg (Prussian Eastern Railway) – Fürstenwalde (Lower Silesian-Märkisch Railway) – Kablow (Königs Wusterhausen–Grunow) – Königs Wusterhausen (Görlitz Railway) – Mittenwalde (Neukölln–Mittenwalde railway) – Wünsdorf (Dresden Railway) – Thyrow (Anhalt Railway) – Beelitz-Stadt (Brandenburg Ring Railway) – Beelitz-Heilstätten (Wetzlar Railway) – Werder (Berlin-Potsdam railway (Stammbahn) – Wustermark (Lehrte Railway) – Nauen (Hamburg Railway) – Vehlefanz (Kremmen Railway) – Sachsenhausen (Nordb) (Prussian Northern Railway) – Wensickendorf and Wandlitzsee (Heidekraut Railway).

== Overview ==
In Berlin there are long-distance stations for rail travellers. The following stop at these stations:

- Deutsche Bahn AG trains:
  - InterCityExpress (ICE)
  - InterCity (IC)
  - EuroCity (EC) and
- Trains of other railway companies:
  - InterConneX (X) – (Veolia Verkehr)
  - Harz-Elbe-Express (HEX) – (Veolia Verkehr)
  - Berlin Night Express (Georg Verkehrsorganisation) (GVG)

There are also regional stations. The following call at these stations:

- Deutsche Bahn AG trains:
  - RegionalExpresse (RE) and
  - RegionalBahnen (RB)
- Trains of other railway companies:
  - Niederbarnimer Eisenbahn (NE),
  - Ostdeutsche Eisenbahn (OE),
  - Märkische Regiobahn (MR) und
  - Prignitzer Eisenbahn (PE).

The following stop at S-Bahn stations:

- S-Bahn Berlin GmbH trains
  - Stadtschnellbahn trains (S-Bahn)

There are also two marshalling yards in the Berlin area.

== Passenger stations ==
The following table gives an overview of the current, former and planned railway stations and halts in the Berlin together with the associated district abbreviation (as used on car number plates) and the types of train that stop there. For readability only one example of the train category is given in the table.

- ICE for long-distance express trains, i.e. also TGV, Thalys etc.
- IC for special long-distance trains, i.e. Also private ones like InterConnex etc.
- NJ for the Austrian sleeper train Nightjet
- FLX for the private long distance train Flixtrain
- RE for local express trains
- RB for regional trains, including those of private operators such as ODEG, UBB etc.
- S for S-Bahn trains
- x means that the train type (or a similar one) calls at the station
- x¹ means that the train type (or a similar one) used to call at the station
- For reasons of space only the car number plate abbreviation for the town or rural district is given. These are:
  - Berlin (B)
  - Landkreis Barnim (BAR)
  - Landkreis Dahme-Spreewald (LDS)
  - Landkreis Havelland (HVL)
  - Landkreis Märkisch-Oderland (MOL)
  - Landkreis Oberhavel (OHV)
  - Landkreis Oder-Spree (LOS)
  - Potsdam (P)
  - Landkreis Potsdam-Mittelmark (PM)
  - Landkreis Teltow-Fläming (TF)

Station	City/ District (Kreis)	Railway operator	Cat	ICE	IC	RE	RB	S	Line	Remarks
Adlershof	B	VBB	4				x¹	x	Görlitz Railway	
Ahrensdorf (Kr. Zossen)	TF						x¹		Outer Ring	closed in 0/68
Ahrensfelde	B	VBB	4				x	x	Wriezen Railway	
Ahrensfelde Friedhof	BAR	VBB	6				x		Wriezen Railway	
Ahrensfelde Nord	BAR	VBB	6				x		Wriezen Railway	
Albrechtshof	B	VBB	6			x¹	x	x¹	Hamburg Railway	S-Bahn out of service since 1961; S-Bahn planned
Alexanderplatz	B	VBB	3		x	x	x	x	Stadtbahn	
Alt-Reinickendorf	B	VBB	5					x	Kremmen Railway	S-Bahn from 1984–1995 out of service
Altglienicke	B	VBB	5				x¹	x	Grünau Cross–BER	
Altlandsberg	MOL						x¹		Altlandsberg Narrow Gauge Railway	closed in 1965
Altlandsberg Seeberg	MOL						x¹		Altlandsberg Narrow Gauge Railway	closed in 1965
Altlandsberg Vorstadt	MOL						x¹		Altlandsberg Narrow Gauge Railway	closed in 1965
Anhalter Bahnhof	B	VBB	3		x¹	x¹	x¹	x	Anhalt Railway	Long-distance and regional services until 1952
Arkenberge	B							x	Outer Ring	S-Bahn planned (by ca. 1990)
Attilastraße	B	VBB	5					x	Dresden Railway	
Ausstellung	B								Görlitz Railway	closed in 1896; Messe station
Babelsberg	P	VBB	5				x¹	x	Wannsee Railway	S-Bahn out of service from 1961–1992
Bärenklau	OHV	VBB	7				x		Kremmen Railway	
Basdorf	BAR	VBB					x		Heidekraut Railway	Owner: NEB
Baumschulenweg	B	VBB	4		x¹		x¹	x	Görlitz Railway	
Beelitz-Heilstätten	PM	VBB	6			x	x¹		Wetzlar Railway	
Beelitz Stadt	PM	VBB	6				x		Jüterbog–Nauen railway	
Bellevue	B	VBB	4					x	Stadtbahn	
Bergfelde (b Berlin)	OHV	VBB	4					x	Outer Ring	
Bergholz (b Potsdam)	PM					x¹	x¹		Outer Ring; Wetzlar Railway	since 1998 out of service
Bernau (b Berlin)	BAR	VBB	3		x	x	x	x	Stettin Railway	
Bernau-Friedenstal station	BAR	VBB	5					x	Stettin Railway	
Betriebsbahnhof Rummelsburg	B	VBB	4					x	Frankfurt Railway	
Betriebsbahnhof Schöneweide	B	VBB	3					x	Görlitz Railway	
Beusselstraße	B	VBB	4					x	Ringbahn	S-Bahn out of service from 1980–1999
Biesdorf	B	VBB	5					x	Prussian Eastern Railway	
Biesdorf Süd	B							x	Outer Ring	S-Bahn planned
Biesdorfer Kreuz	B							x	Outer Ring; Prussian Eastern Railway	S-Bahn planned
Birkengrund	TF	VBB	6			x	x¹		Anhalt Railway	out of service1998–2006
Birkengrund Nord	TF						x¹		Anhalt Railway	closed 1998
Birkenstein	MOL	VBB	5					x	Prussian Eastern Railway	
Birkenwerder	OHV	VBB	4				x	x	Prussian Northern Railway	Mixied S-Bahn/RB traffic
Blankenburg	B	VBB	4				x¹	x	Stettin Railway	
Blankenfelde	B						x¹		Heidekraut Railway	since 1983 out of service; owner: NEB
Blankenfelde (Kr. Teltow-Fläming)	TF	VBB	4			x	x¹	x	Dresden Railway	S-Bahn out of service1961–1992
Blumberg (b Berlin)	BAR	VBB	6				x		Wriezen Railway	
Borgsdorf	OHV	VBB	5					x	Prussian Northern Railway	
Bornholmer Straße	B	VBB	3					x	Prussian Northern Railway; Stettin Railway	S-Bahn out of service1961–1990
Bornim-Grube	P						x¹		Outer Ring; Brandenburg Ring Railway	out of service since 1994
Borsigwalde	B							x	Kremmen Railway	S-Bahn planned
Botanischer Garten	B	VBB	4					x	Wannsee Railway	S-Bahn out of service1980–1985
BER Airport (Berlin Brandenburg Airport Terminals 1–2)	LDS	VBB	2	x	x	x	x	x	Berlin Outer Ring Railway; Grünau Cross–BER	
Brieselang	HVL	VBB	6			x¹	x		Hamburg Railway	
Britz	B						x¹		Neukölln–Mittenwalde railway	closed 1955
Brusendorf	LDS						x¹		Neukölln–Mittenwalde railway	closed 1951
Buch	B	VBB	5					x	Stettin Railway	
Buchholz	B							x	Outer Ring	S-Bahn planned (by ca. 1990)
Buckow	B						x¹		Neukölln–Mittenwalde railway	closed
Buckower Chaussee	B	VBB	5					x	Dresden Railway	
Bundesplatz	B	VBB	4					x	Ringbahn	S-Bahn out of service1980–1993
Bürknersfelde	B							x	Outer Ring	S-Bahn planned
Caputh-Geltow	PM	VBB	6			x¹	x		Jüterbog–Nauen railway	
Caputh-Schwielowsee	PM	VBB	6			x¹	x		Brandenburg Ring Railway	
Charlottenburg	B	VBB	3		x¹	x	x	x	Stadtbahn; Wetzlar Railway	
Charlottenburger Chaussee	B							x	Spandau Suburban Line	S-Bahn planned
Charlottenhof	P	VBB	5			x	x		Berlin-Potsdam-Magdeburg railway	
Dabendorf	TF	VBB	5			x	x¹		Dresden Railway	
Dahlewitz	TF	VBB	5			x	x¹	x¹	Dresden Railway	S-Bahn out of service since 1961
Dallgow-Döberitz	HVL	VBB	5			x	x		Lehrte Railway	
Diedersdorf	TF						x¹		Outer Ring	
Dreilinden	PM							x¹	Cemetery Line	closed 1961
Dresdener station	B				x¹	x¹	x¹		Dresden Railway	1882 closed
Düppel	B						x¹	x¹	Berlin-Potsdam-Magdeburg railway	closed 1980
Eichborndamm	B	VBB	5					x	Kremmen Railway	S-Bahn out of service 1984–1995
Eichgestell	B						x¹		Outer Ring	
Eichwalde	LDS	VBB	5					x	Görlitz Railway	
Eichwalde-Schmöckwitz	B						x¹		Görlitz Railway	closed 1898
Elstal	HVL	VBB	6			x	x		Lehrte Railway	
Elstal (Kr. Nauen)	HVL						x¹		Outer Ring; Brandenburg Ring Railway	closed 1994
Erkner	LOS	VBB	3			x	x¹	x	Frankfurt Railway	
Falkenhagen (Kr. Nauen)	HVL						x¹		Outer Ring	closed 1996
Falkensee	HVL	VBB	4			x	x	x¹	Hamburg Railway	S-Bahn out of service since 1961; S-Bahn planned
Fangschleuse	LOS	VBB	6			x	x¹		Frankfurt Railway	
Ferch-Lienewitz	PM	VBB	7			x¹	x		Jüterbog–Nauen railway	
Finkenkrug	HVL	VBB	6			x¹	x		Hamburg Railway	S-Bahn planned
Frankfurter Allee	B	VBB	4					x	Ringbahn	
Fredersdorf (b Berlin)	MOL	VBB	5					x	Prussian Eastern Railway; Fredersdorf–Rüdersdorf	
Friedenau	B	VBB	4					x	Wannsee Railway	S-Bahn out of service 1980–1985
Friedrichsfelde Friedhof	B						x¹		Wriezen Railway	closed 1945
Friedrichsfelde Ost	B	VBB	4					x	Prussian Eastern Railway	
Friedrichshagen	B	VBB	4					x	Frankfurt Railway	
Friedrichstraße	B	VBB	2		x	x	x	x	Stadtbahn; North-South Tunnel	no through S-Bahn services 1961–1990
Frohnau	B	VBB	4					x	Prussian Northern Railway	S-Bahn out of service 1984
Fürstenwalde (Spree)	LOS	VBB	4			x	x		Frankfurt Railway; Scharmützelsee Railway; Oderbruch Railway	
Gartenfeld	B							x¹	Siemensbahn	closed 1980
Gehrenseestraße	B	VBB	5					x	Outer Ring	
Genshagener Heide	TF	VBB	6				x		Outer Ring	
Gesundbrunnen	B	VBB	1	x	x	x	x¹	x	Ringbahn; Stettin Railway; Prussian Northern Railway	S-Bahn out of service 1984
Gleisdreieck	B							x	Zoo Tunnel	S-Bahn planned
Berlin Görlitzer Bahnhof	B				x¹	x¹	x¹		Görlitz Railway	closed 1952
Golm	P	VBB	6				x		Outer Ring; Jüterbog–Nauen railway	
Greifswalder Straße	B	VBB	4					x	Ringbahn	
Griebnitzsee	P	VBB	4				x	x	Berlin-Potsdam-Magdeburg railway Wannsee Railway	S-Bahn out of service 1961–1992
Groß Kienitz	LDS						x¹		Neukölln–Mittenwalde railway	closed 1951
Großbeeren	TF	VBB	6				x		Anhalt Railway	out of service 1998–2006
Großziethen	LDS						x¹		Outer freight ring	closed 1958
Großziethen Ost	LDS						x¹		Outer freight ring	closed 1958
Grünau	B	VBB	4				x¹	x	Görlitz Railway	Regional services until 1958
Grünbergallee	B	VBB	5				x¹	x	Grünau Cross–BER	Regional services until 1958
Grunewald	B	VBB	5				x¹	x	Wetzlar Railway	S-Bahn out of service 1984
Hackbuschstraße	B							x	Hamburg Railway	S-Bahn planned
Hackescher Markt	B	VBB	4					x	Stadtbahn	
Halensee	B	VBB	4					x	Ringbahn	S-Bahn out of service 1980–1993
Hamburg station	B				x¹	x¹	x¹		Hamburg Railway	closed 1884
Hangelsberg	LOS	VBB	6			x	x¹		Frankfurt Railway	
Hauptbahnhof	B	VBB	1	x	x	x	x	x	Stadtbahn; North–South mainline	Note: from 1987 to 1998 the present-day Ostbahnhof was called Berlin Hauptbahnhof
Heerstraße	B	VBB	5					x	Spandau Suburban Line	S-Bahn out of service 1980–1998
Hegermühle	MOL	VBB	6					x	Strausberg–Strausberg Nord	
Heidelberger Platz	B	VBB	4					x	Ringbahn	S-Bahn out of service 1980–1993
Heiligensee	B	VBB	4					x	Kremmen Railway	S-Bahn out of service 1984–1998
Hennigsdorf (b Berlin)	OHV	VBB	3			x	x	x	Kremmen Railway	S-Bahn out of service 1983–1998
Hennigsdorf Nord	OHV						x¹	x¹	Outer Ring; Kremmen Railway	S-Bahn out of service since 1983; closed in 1995/98
Hermannstraße	B	VBB	4				x¹	x	Ringbahn; Neukölln–Mittenwalde railway	Regional services until 1955; S-Bahn out of service 1980–1993
Hermsdorf	B	VBB	4		x¹	x¹	x¹	x	Prussian Northern Railway	Long-distance and regional services to 1925; S-Bahn out of service 1984
Hirschgarten	B	VBB	5					x	Frankfurt Railway	
Hohen Neuendorf (b Berlin)	OHV	VBB	5					x	Prussian Northern Railway	
Hohen Neuendorf West	OHV	VBB	6			x¹	x		Outer Ring	
Hohenschönhausen	B	VBB	4		x¹	x¹	x	x	Outer Ring	
Hohenschöpping	OHV						x¹	x¹	Kremmen Railway	S-Bahn out of service since 1983; closed 1998
Hohenzollerndamm	B	VBB	4					x	Ringbahn	S-Bahn out of service 1980–1993
Hoppegarten (Mark)	MOL	VBB	4				x¹	x	Prussian Eastern Railway; Altlandsberg Railway	Regional services to 1965
Humboldthain	B	VBB	5					x	Stettin Railway; Prussian Northern Railway	S-Bahn 1984 out of service
Innsbrucker Platz	B	VBB	4					x	Ringbahn	S-Bahn out of service 1980–1993
Jannowitzbrücke	B	VBB	4					x	Stadtbahn	
Julius-Leber-Brücke	B	VBB	4					x	Wannsee Railway	From 1881–1944 a station with the name Kolonnenstraße stood on the same spot
Jungfernheide	B	VBB	4			x	x¹	x	Ringbahn; Hamburg Railway; Lehrte Railway; Siemensbahn	S-Bahn out of service 1980–1997
Kablow	LDS	VBB	7				x		Königs Wusterhausen–Grunow	
Kamenzer Damm	B							x	Dresden Railway	S-Bahn planned
Kanne	B						x¹		Görlitz Railway	1887 closed
Karl-Bonhoeffer-Nervenklinik	B	VBB	6					x	Kremmen Railway	S-Bahn out of service 1984–1995
Karlshorst	B	VBB	3		x¹	x	x	x	Frankfurt Railway	
Karow	B	VBB	5				x	x	Stettin Railway; Outer freight ring	Mixed S-Bahn/RB traffic
Karower Kreuz	B					x	x	x	Outer Ring; Stettin Railway	S-Bahn and regional services planned
Kaulsdorf	B	VBB	5			x¹	x¹	x	Prussian Eastern Railway	Regional services until 1930
Kiefholzstraße	B							x	Ringbahn	S-Bahn planned
Kohlhasenbrück	B							x¹	Wannsee Railway	1946 provisional arrangement
Köllnische Heide	B	VBB	5					x	Baumschulenweg–Neukölln link line	S-Bahn out of service 1980–1993
Kolonnenstraße	B							x¹	Südringspitzkehre	S-Bahn closed since 1944; opened again in 2007 on the Wannsee Railway as Julius-Leber-Brücke
Königs Wusterhausen	LDS	VBB	4			x	x	x	Görlitz Railway; Königs Wusterhausen-Mittenwalde-Töpchin Narrow Gauge Railway; Königs Wusterhausen–Grunow	
Köpenick	B	VBB	4					x	Frankfurt Railway	
Landsberger Allee	B	VBB	4					x	Ringbahn	
Lankwitz	B	VBB	6					x	Anhalt Suburban Line	S-Bahn out of service 1984–1995
Lehnitz	OHV	VBB	5					x	Prussian Northern Railway	
Lehrter station	B			x¹	x¹	x¹	x¹		Lehrte Railway	Long-distance and regional services until 1952; see also Hauptbahnhof
Lehrter Stadtbahnhof	B							x¹	Stadtbahn	S-Bahnverkehr until 2002; see also Hauptbahnhof
Lichtenberg	B	VBB	2	x¹	x	x¹	x	x	Prussian Eastern Railway; Wriezen Railway	
Lichtenrade	B	VBB	5					x	Dresden Railway	
Lichtenrade Ost	B						x¹		Outer freight ring	closed 1951
Lichterfelde Ost	B	VBB	3		x¹	x	x¹	x	Anhalt Suburban Line; Anhalt Railway	S-Bahn out of service 1984–1995
Lichterfelde Süd	B	VBB	4		x¹	x¹	x¹	x	Anhalt Suburban Line; Berlin-Lichterfelde Süd–Teltow Stadt railway Anhalt Railway	S-Bahn out of service 1984–1998
Lichterfelde West	B	VBB	4		x¹			x	Wannsee Railway; Berlin-Potsdam-Magdeburg railway	S-Bahn out of service 1980–1985; US forces military station
Ludwigsfelde	TF	VBB	4		x¹	x	x¹		Anhalt Railway	
Magerviehhof	B						x¹		Wriezen Railway	closed 1918
Mahlow	TF	VBB	5				x¹	x	Dresden Railway	S-Bahn out of service 1961–1992
Mahlsdorf	B	VBB	4				x¹	x	Prussian Eastern Railway	
Marienfelde	B	VBB	5					x	Dresden Railway	
Marquardt	P	VBB	6				x		Outer Ring; Jüterbog–Nauen railway	
Marzahn	B	VBB	4				x¹	x	Wriezen Railway	Regional services until 1980
Medienstadt Babelsberg	P	VBB	5			x	x		Wetzlar Railway	
Mehrower Allee	B	VBB	5				x¹	x	Wriezen Railway	Regional services until 1982
Messe Nord/ICC	B	VBB	4					x	Ringbahn; Stadtbahn	S-Bahn out of service since 1944 or 1980–1993
Messe Süd	B	VBB	5					x	Spandau Suburban Line	S-Bahn out of service 1980–1998
Mexikoplatz	B	VBB	4					x	Wannsee Railway	S-Bahn out of service 1980–1985
Michendorf	PM	VBB	4			x	x		Wetzlar Railway	
Mittenwalde Nord	LDS						x¹		Neukölln–Mittenwalde railway	closed 1951
Mittenwalde Ost	LDS						x¹		Neukölln–Mittenwalde railway Königs Wusterhausen-Mittenwalde-Töpchiner railway	closed 1974
Mittenwalde Krankenhaus	LDS						x¹		Neukölln–Mittenwalde railway	closed 1933
Mühlenbeck	OHV						x¹		Heidekraut Railway	out of service since 1983
Mühlenbeck-Mönchmühle	OHV	VBB	6					x	Outer Ring	
Nauen	HVL	VBB	3			x	x		Hamburg Railway; Jüterbog–Nauen railway	
Nauener Straße	B							x	Hamburg Railway	S-Bahn planned
Neuenhagen (b Berlin)	MOL	VBB	6					x	Prussian Eastern Railway	
Neuenhagen Dorf	MOL						x¹		Altlandsberg Railway	closed in 1965
Neukölln	B	VBB	3					x	Ringbahn; Baumschulenweg–Neukölln link line	S-Bahn out of service 1980–1993
Niederlehme	LDS	VBB	7				x		Königs Wusterhausen–Grunow	
Nikolassee	B	VBB	4					x	Wannsee Railway; Wetzlar Railway	S-Bahn out of service 1984 or 1980–1985
Nöldnerplatz	B	VBB	5					x	Prussian Eastern Railway	
Nordbahnhof	B	VBB	4		x¹	x¹	x¹	x	Stettin Railway; Prussian Northern Railway; North-South Tunnel	Long-distance and regional services until 1952; ghost station 1961–1990
Nordbahnhof (alt)	B				x¹	x¹	x¹		Prussian Northern Railway	closed 1897
Oberspree	B	VBB	6					x	Schöneweide–Spindlersfeld Branch	
Oderstraße	B							x	Ringbahn	S-Bahn planned (until ca. 1945)
Olympiastadion	B	VBB	3					x	Spandau Suburban Line	additional station for the event; S-Bahn out of service 1980–1998
Oranienburg	OHV	VBB	3		x¹	x	x	x	Prussian Northern Railway; Brandenburg Ring Railway	
Oranienburger Straße	B	VBB	4					x	North-South Tunnel	ghost station 1961–1990
Osdorfer Straße	B	VBB	5					x	Anhalt Suburban Line	
Ostbahnhof	B	VBB	1	x	x	x	x	x	Stadtbahn; Frankfurt Railway	1987–1998 Berlin Hauptbahnhof
Preußische Ostbahnhof (Küstriner station )	B				x¹	x¹	x¹		Prussian Eastern Railway	closed 1882
Ostkreuz	B	VBB	3					x	Frankfurt Railway; Prussian Eastern Railway; Ringbahn	Regional services planned
Pankow	B	VBB	5					x	Stettin Railway	
Pankow-Heinersdorf	B	VBB	4					x	Stettin Railway	
Park Sanssouci	P	VBB	4			x	x		Berlin-Potsdam-Magdeburg railway Jüterbog–Nauen railway	
Perleberger Brücke	B							x	Zoo Tunnel	S-Bahn planned
Petershagen	MOL						x¹		Fredersdorf–Rüdersdorf	no passenger services since 1965
Petershagen Nord	MOL	VBB	6					x	Prussian Eastern Railway	
Pichelsberg	B	VBB	5					x	Spandau Suburban Line	S-Bahn out of service 1980–1998
Pirschheide	P	VBB	5		x¹	x¹	x		Outer Ring; Jüterbog–Nauen railway	
Plänterwald	B	VBB	4					x	Görlitz Railway	
Poelchaustraße	B	VBB	5					x	Wriezen Railway	
Potsdam Hauptbahnhof	P	VBB	2	x¹	x	x	x	x	Berlin-Potsdam-Magdeburg railway Wannsee Railway	S-Bahn 1961–1992 out of service
Potsdamer Bahnhof	B				x¹	x¹	x¹	x¹	Berlin-Potsdam-Magdeburg railway	closed 1944
Potsdamer Platz	B	VBB	2			x		x	North-South Tunnel; North–South mainline	ghost station 1961–1990
Potsdamer Ring station	B							x¹	Anhalt Suburban Line; Südringspitzkehre	closed 1944
Prenzlauer Allee	B	VBB	4					x	Ringbahn	
Priesterweg	B	VBB	4					x	Anhalt Suburban Line; Dresden Railway	
Priort	HVL	VBB	6				x		Outer Ring; Jüterbog–Nauen railway	
Rahnsdorf	B	VBB	5					x	Frankfurt Railway	
Rangsdorf	TF	VBB	5			x	x¹	x¹	Dresden Railway	S-Bahn since 1961 out of service
Raoul-Wallenberg-Straße	B	VBB	5					x	Wriezen Railway	
Rathaus Steglitz	B	VBB	4					x	Wannsee Railway	S-Bahn out of service 1980–1985
Rehbrücke	PM	VBB	5		x	x	x		Wetzlar Railway	
Röntgental	BAR	VBB	4					x	Stettin Railway	
Rosenthal	B						x¹		Heidekraut Railway	since 1961 out of service; Owner: NEB
Rüdersdorf	MOL						x¹		Fredersdorf–Rüdersdorf	no passenger services since 1965
Rüdnitz	BAR	VBB	6				x		Stettin Railway	
Rudow	B						x¹		Neukölln–Mittenwalde railway	no passenger services since 1955
Rudow West	B						x¹		Neukölln–Mittenwalde railway	no passenger services since 1955
Rummelsburg	B	VBB	4					x	Frankfurt Railway	
Saarmund	PM	VBB	6				x		Outer Ring	
Sachsenhausen (Nordb)	OHV	VBB	6				x		Prussian Northern Railway	
Satzkorn	PM						x¹		Outer Ring; Brandenburg Ring Railway	out of service since 1993
Savignyplatz	B	VBB	4					x	Stadtbahn	
Schichauweg	B	VBB	5					x	Dresden Railway	
Schildow	OHV						x¹		Heidekraut Railway	out of service since 1983
Schildow-Mönchmühle	OHV						x¹		Heidekraut Railway	out of service since 1983
Schlachtensee	B	VBB	4					x	Wannsee Railway	S-Bahn out of service 1980–1985
Schmachtenhagen	OHV	VBB					x		Outer freight ring	only weekends
Schöneberg	B	VBB	3					x	Ringbahn; Wannsee Railway	S-Bahn out of service 1980–1985 or 1980–1993
Schönefeld (bei Berlin)	LDS	VBB	3	x¹	x	x	x	x	Outer Ring; Grünau Cross–BER	
Schönefeld Mitte	LDS						x¹		Outer freight ring	closed 1951
Schönefeld Siedlung	LDS						x¹		Outer freight ring	closed 1958
Schönerlinde	BAR	VBB					x		Heidekraut Railway	Owner: NEB
Schöneweide	B	VBB	3		x¹	x¹	x	x	Görlitz Railway; Schöneweide–Spindlersfeld Branch	
Schönfließ	OHV	VBB	5				x¹	x	Outer Ring	Regional services until 1995
Schönhauser Allee	B	VBB	4					x	Ringbahn	
Schönholz	B	VBB	5					x	Prussian Northern Railway	S-Bahn out of service 1984
Schönwalde Hp	BAR	VBB					x		Outer freight ring	Owner: NEB
Schönwalde (Kr. Barnim)	BAR						x¹		Heidekraut Railway	out of service since 1983; Owner: NEB
Schönwalde (Kr. Nauen)	HVL						x¹		Outer Ring	out of service since 1995
Schulzendorf (b Tegel)	B	VBB	5					x	Kremmen Railway	S-Bahn out of service 1984–1998
Seddin	PM	VBB	5			x	x		Wetzlar Railway	
Seefeld (Mark)	BAR	VBB	6				x		Wriezen Railway	
Seegefeld	HVL	VBB	5			x¹	x		Hamburg Railway	S-Bahn planned
Selchow	LDS						x¹		Neukölln–Mittenwalde railway	closed 1951
Sellheimbrücke	B							x	Outer Ring	S-Bahn planned
Siemensstadt	B							x¹	Siemensbahn	1980 closed
Siemensstadt-Fürstenbrunn	B						x¹	x¹	Hamburg Railway; Lehrte Railway	closed 1980
Sonnenallee	B	VBB	4					x	Ringbahn	S-Bahn out of service 1980–1997
Spandau	B	VBB	2	x	x	x	x	x	Hamburg Railway; Lehrte Railway	S-Bahn out of service 1980–1998
Spindlersfeld	B	VBB	5					x	Schöneweide–Spindlersfeld Branch	
Springpfuhl	B	VBB	4					x	Outer Ring	
Staaken	B	VBB	6			x	x	x¹	Lehrte Railway	S-Bahn out of service since 1980
Stadtgrenze	B						x¹		Neukölln–Mittenwalde railway	closed 1955
Stahnsdorf	PM							x¹	Cemetery Line	closed 1961
Stolpe-Süd	OHV							x¹	Kremmen Railway	1954–1958 Kontrollbahnhof; closed 1961
Storkower Straße	B	VBB	4					x	Ringbahn	
Strausberg	MOL	VBB	4				x	x	Prussian Eastern Railway; Strausberg–Strausberg Nord; Strausberg-Herzfeld railway	
Strausberg Nord	MOL	VBB	6				x¹	x	Strausberg–Strausberg Nord	
Strausberg Stadt	MOL	VBB	6				x¹	x	Strausberg–Strausberg Nord	
Stresow	B	VBB	4	x¹	x¹	x¹	x¹	x	Hamburg Railway; Lehrte Railway; Spandau Suburban Line	S-Bahn out of service 1980–1998
Südende	B	VBB	4					x	Anhalt Suburban Line	S-Bahn out of service 1984–1995
Südkreuz	B	VBB	1	x	x	x		x	Anhalt Suburban Line; Anhalt Railway; Dresden Railway; Ringbahn	
Sundgauer Straße	B	VBB	5					x	Wannsee Railway	S-Bahn out of service 1980–1985
Tegel	B	VBB	4					x	Kremmen Railway	S-Bahn out of service 1984–1995; French Forces railway station
Teltow	PM	VBB	6			x	x¹	x¹	Anhalt Railway	S-Bahn out of service since 1961
Teltow Stadt	PM	VBB	5					x	Berlin-Lichterfelde Süd–Teltow Stadt railway	
Teltowkanal	B						x¹		Neukölln–Mittenwalde railway	closed 1955
Tempelhof	B	VBB	4					x	Ringbahn	S-Bahn out of service 1980–1993
Thyrow	TF	VBB	6			x	x¹		Anhalt Railway	
Tiergarten	B	VBB	4					x	Stadtbahn	
Treptower Park	B	VBB	4					x	Ringbahn	
Unter den Linden	B	VBB	4					x	North-South Tunnel	ghost station 1961–1990
Vehlefanz	OHV	VBB	7				x		Kremmen Railway	
Velten (Mark)	OHV	VBB	5			x	x	x¹	Kremmen Railway; Oranienburg–Velten	S-Bahn out of service since 1983
Waidmannslust	B	VBB	4					x	Prussian Northern Railway	S-Bahn out of service 1984
Wandlitz	BAR	VBB					x		Heidekraut Railway	Owner: NEB
Wandlitzsee	BAR	VBB					x		Heidekraut Railway	Owner: NEB
Wannsee	B	VBB	2	x¹	x	x	x	x	Wannsee Railway; Wetzlar Railway	S-Bahn out of service 1984
Wannsee station	B							x¹	Wannsee Railway	closed 1939
Warschauer Straße	B	VBB	4			x¹		x	Frankfurt Railway; Prussian Eastern Railway	
Wartenberg	B	VBB	5					x	Outer Ring	
Wasserstadt Spandau	B							x	Siemensbahn	S-Bahn planned
Waßmannsdorf	LDS	VBB	6					x	Berlin Outer Ring Railway	under construction
Wedding	B	VBB	4					x	Ringbahn	S-Bahn out of service 1980–2002
Wensickendorf	OHV	VBB					x		Heidekraut Railway	
Werder (Havel)	PM	VBB	4			x	x¹		Berlin-Potsdam-Magdeburg railway	
Wernerwerk	B							x¹	Siemensbahn	closed 1980
Werneuchen	BAR	VBB	6				x		Wriezen Railway	
Westend	B	VBB	4					x	Ringbahn	S-Bahn out of service 1980–1993
Westhafen	B	VBB	4				x¹	x	Hamburg Railway; Lehrte Railway; Ringbahn	S-Bahn out of service 1980–1999
Westkreuz	B	VBB	3				x¹	x	Ringbahn; Spandau Suburban Line; Wetzlar Railway	S-Bahn out of service 1984 or 1980–1993
Wildau	LDS	VBB	5					x	Görlitz Railway	
Wilhelmshagen	B	VBB	5					x	Frankfurt Railway	
Wilhelmshorst	PM	VBB	5			x	x		Wetzlar Railway	
Wilhelmsruh	B	VBB	5				x¹	x	Prussian Northern Railway; Heidekraut Railway	Regional services until 1961; S-Bahn out of service 1984
Wittenau (Wilhelmsruher Damm)	B	VBB	4					x	Prussian Northern Railway	S-Bahn out of service 1984
Wollankstraße	B	VBB	4					x	Prussian Northern Railway	S-Bahn out of service 1984
Wriezen Bahnhof	B					x¹	x¹		Wriezen Railway	closed 1949
Wuhletal	B	VBB	4					x	Prussian Eastern Railway	common platform with U-Bahn route 5 (Berlin)
Wuhlheide	B	VBB	4				x¹	x	Frankfurt Railway	Transfer to Berlin Park Railway
Wünsdorf-Waldstadt	TF	VBB	4			x	x¹		Dresden Railway	
Wustermark	HVL	VBB	5			x	x		Lehrte Railway	
Yorckstraße	B	VBB	5					x	Anhalt Suburban Line; Dresden Railway	
Yorckstraße (Großgörschenstraße)	B	VBB	5					x	Wannsee Railway	S-Bahn out of service 1980–1985
Zehlendorf	B	VBB	4		x¹	x¹	x¹	x	Berlin-Potsdam-Magdeburg railway Wannsee Railway	S-Bahn out of service since 1980 or 1980–1985
Zehlendorf Süd	B							x¹	Berlin-Potsdam-Magdeburg railway	closed 1980
Zepernick (b Bernau)	BAR	VBB	5					x	Stettin Railway	
Zernsdorf	LDS	VBB	6				x		Königs Wusterhausen–Grunow	
Zeuthen	LDS	VBB	5					x	Görlitz Railway	
Zoologischer Garten	B	VBB	2	x¹	x	x	x	x	Stadtbahn	
Zossen	TF	VBB	5			x	x¹		Dresden Railway; Neukölln–Mittenwalde railway Military railway	
Zühlsdorf	OHV	VBB					x		Heidekraut Railway	

== Marshalling yards ==
=== Operational facilities ===
- Seddin (located outside the Berlin city area on the Wetzlar Railway south of Potsdam)
- Berlin Nordost (on the Outer Ring)
- Wustermark Rbf (formerly Berlin's largest marshalling yard, located outside the Berlin city area, closed in 2001, bought in 2008 by the Havelländische Eisenbahn (HVLE) and since 1 July 2008 used as a link line from the Rail & Logistik Center at Wustermark)

=== Closed facilities ===
- Berlin Wuhlheide Rbf (1994 closed, demolished)
- Berlin-Tempelhof Rbf (1952 closed, demolished)
- Berlin-Pankow (1997 closed, partly demolished)
- Berlin-Lichtenberg (converted to a storage yard for passenger coaches)
- Berlin-Rummelsburg (converted to a storage yard for passenger coaches)
- Berlin-Niederschöneweide (1996 closed)

In addition, during the Second World War there were three supplementary marshalling yards (Hilfsrangierbahnhöfe) outside the political city boundaries:

- Rüdnitz
- Fredersdorf
- Großbeeren

== See also ==
- List of Berlin S-Bahn stations
- List of Berlin U-Bahn stations
- List of railway stations in Brandenburg
- List of scheduled railway routes in Germany
- List of closed railway lines in Brandenburg and Berlin
