= Lankwitz station =

Railway station in Berlin

Lankwitz
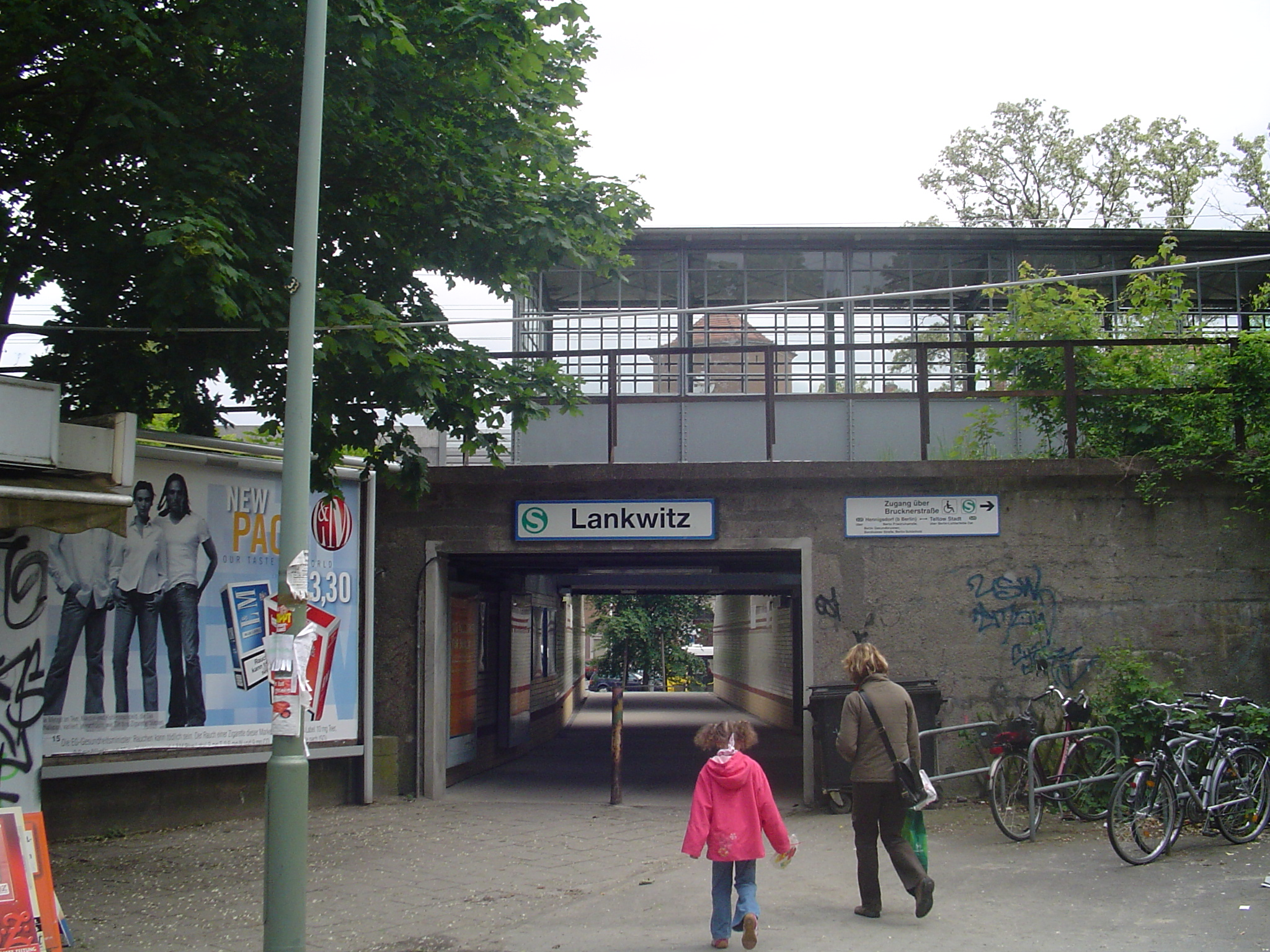
- Lankwitz station from the north

General information
- Location: Leonorenstr. 60, Lankwitz, Steglitz-Zehlendorf, Berlin; Germany
- Coordinates: 52°26′19″N 13°20′30″E
- Line: Anhalt Suburban Line (KBS 200.25)
- Platforms: 1
- Tracks: 1

Construction
- Accessible: Yes

Other information
- Station code: 7144
- DS100 code: BLAK
- IBNR: 8089114
- Category: 6
- Fare zone: VBB: Berlin B/5656
- Website: sbahn.berlin; www.bahnhof.de

History
- Opened: 1 December 1895; 28 May 1995
- Closed: 9 January 1984
- Former names: Lankwitz-Viktoriastraße (1895–1899)

Services
| Preceding station | Berlin S-Bahn | Following station |
|---|---|---|
| Südende towards Hennigsdorf | S25 | Lichterfelde Ost towards Teltow Stadt |
| Südende towards Blankenburg | S26 | Lichterfelde Ost towards Teltow Stadt |
Location
- Location within Berlin

Lankwitz station is on the Anhalt Suburban Line in the suburb of Lankwitz in the Berlin borough of Steglitz-Zehlendorf. It is served by S-Bahn line S25 and S-Bahn line S26. It has a south-western entrance on Brucknerstraße. Its north-eastern entrance connects to a path which runs to the south-east through a pedestrian tunnel running under the S-Bahn and the mainline to the square in front of Lankwitz Rathaus (town hall). In the other direction (to the north-west), this path provides a barrier-free access to Kaulbachstraße.

== History ==
The track was built in 1841 at ground level as a single track. It had been duplicated by 1849. The first station in Lankwitz was opened on 1 December 1895, following a sustained campaign by local councillor August Bruchwitz, as Lankwitz-Viktoriastraße station to the north of the current Leonorenstraße (called Viktoriastraße until 1937). On 30 September 1899, the station was renamed Lankwitz. Shortly later the line was raised above street level and upgraded to four tracks, while the station was rebuilt south of Leonorenstraße at its present elevated position and opened in 1901. Only suburban trains have since stopped in Lankwitz. Electric train services commenced in 1903 on the first electrified track in Berlin and were converted in 1929 to the 750 volts DC system, which is still used on the Berlin S-Bahn.

During the Second World War, the bridge over the Teltow Canal was destroyed. The line between Lankwitz and Südende was rebuilt as a single track and reopened on 17 August 1945. Following the takeover of the S-Bahn by the Berliner Verkehrsbetriebe (BVG, Berlin Transportation Company) on 9 January 1984, the route from Priesterweg to Lichterfelde Süd through Lankwitz was shut down. It was not planned to restart operations and the bridge over Leonorenstraße was demolished.

After the fall of the Berlin Wall, the importance of the line grew. It was reopened after renovations on 28 May 1995. At the same time, the single-track section over the Teltow Canal was extended towards the south, so the line through Lankwitz station has had one track since then. The eastern edge of the former island platform is now used for trains running in both directions. It is currently the only single-track railway station in Berlin with S-Bahn services running at 10-minute intervals. Until the introduction of driver only operations using monitors (Zugfahrerselbstabfertigung, ZAT), the S-Bahn station was monitored remotely by staff at Südende station.

Lankwitz station was formerly planned as an interchange between the S-Bahn and a possible extension of U-Bahn line U9. Due to the city's financial situation, however, this is now no longer planned.

== Connections ==
The station is served by line S25 and S-Bahn line S26 of the Berlin S-Bahn. There are interchanges with bus routes X83, M82, 181, 187, 283, 284 and N81 of the Berliner Verkehrsbetriebe.

== See also ==
- List of railway stations in Berlin
