= Attilastraße station =

Railway station in Berlin

Attilastraße
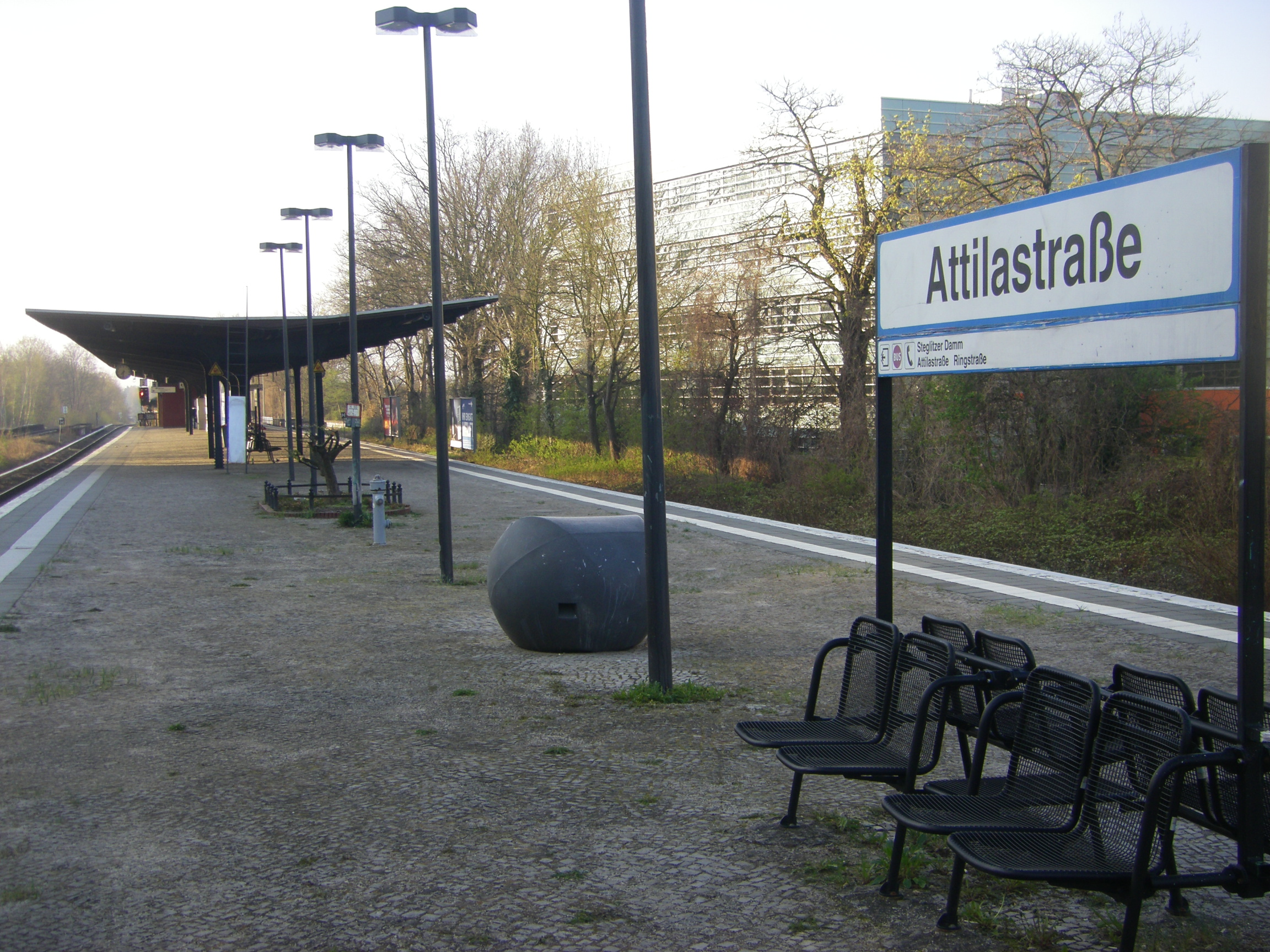
- Platform

General information
- Location: Tempelhof, Tempelhof-Schöneberg, Berlin; Germany
- Coordinates: 52°26′52″N 13°21′39″E
- Line: Berlin–Dresden suburban railway (KBS 200.2)
- Platforms: 2

Construction
- Accessible: Yes
- Architectural style: modernism

Other information
- Station code: 203
- DS100 code: BATS
- IBNR: 8089003
- Category: 5
- Fare zone: VBB: Berlin B/5656
- Website: www.bahnhof.de

History
- Opened: 15 February 1895
- Former names: Mariendorf (1895–1992)

Services
Preceding station	Berlin S-Bahn	Following station
Priesterweg towards Bernau	S2	Marienfelde towards Blankenfelde
Location

Attilastraße station is on the Berlin–Dresden railway in the district of Tempelhof in the Berlin borough of Tempelhof-Schöneberg. It is served by Berlin S-Bahn line S2. It was opened in 1895 under the name of Mariendorf and electrified in 1939. It was renamed Attilastraße in 1992.

== Location ==
It was originally in the municipality of Mariendorf and it is located almost two kilometres northwest of the centre of Mariendorf. In 1920, Mariendorf and the area around the station were incorporated into Berlin. The Südende locality to the west of the station became part of the district of Steglitz. The boundary between the districts of Mariendorf and Steglitz ran immediately to the west of the station. Since 1938, the station has not been in Mariendorf, but instead in the locality of Tempelhof in the district of the same name, which is now part of the district of Tempelhof-Schöneberg.

== History ==
The station was built at the intersection of the Berlin–Dresden Railway with the road from Lankwitz to Tempelhof. It replaced the Südende B. D. station (the acronym stood for Berlin and Dresden and distinguished it from the Südende station on the Anhalt Railway), which was built in 1875. The original facilities were considered very basic. In the northern part of the station, there was a set of points connecting the single track from Berlin to the double-track line towards Zossen. At the same time the track of the Prussian military railway ran past the station but did not connect with it. The station was rebuilt in its current layout in 1910–1914 after the raising of the track above ground level. The suburban tracks were electrified in 1939.

The bridge over the Teltow Canal was destroyed by German troops in 1945. After the war, the bridge was replaced by a temporary wooden bridge, which burned down in the summer of 1947. For several weeks, passengers had to stop at a temporary platform on the south bank of the canal and walk to Mariendorf station.

== Infrastructure ==
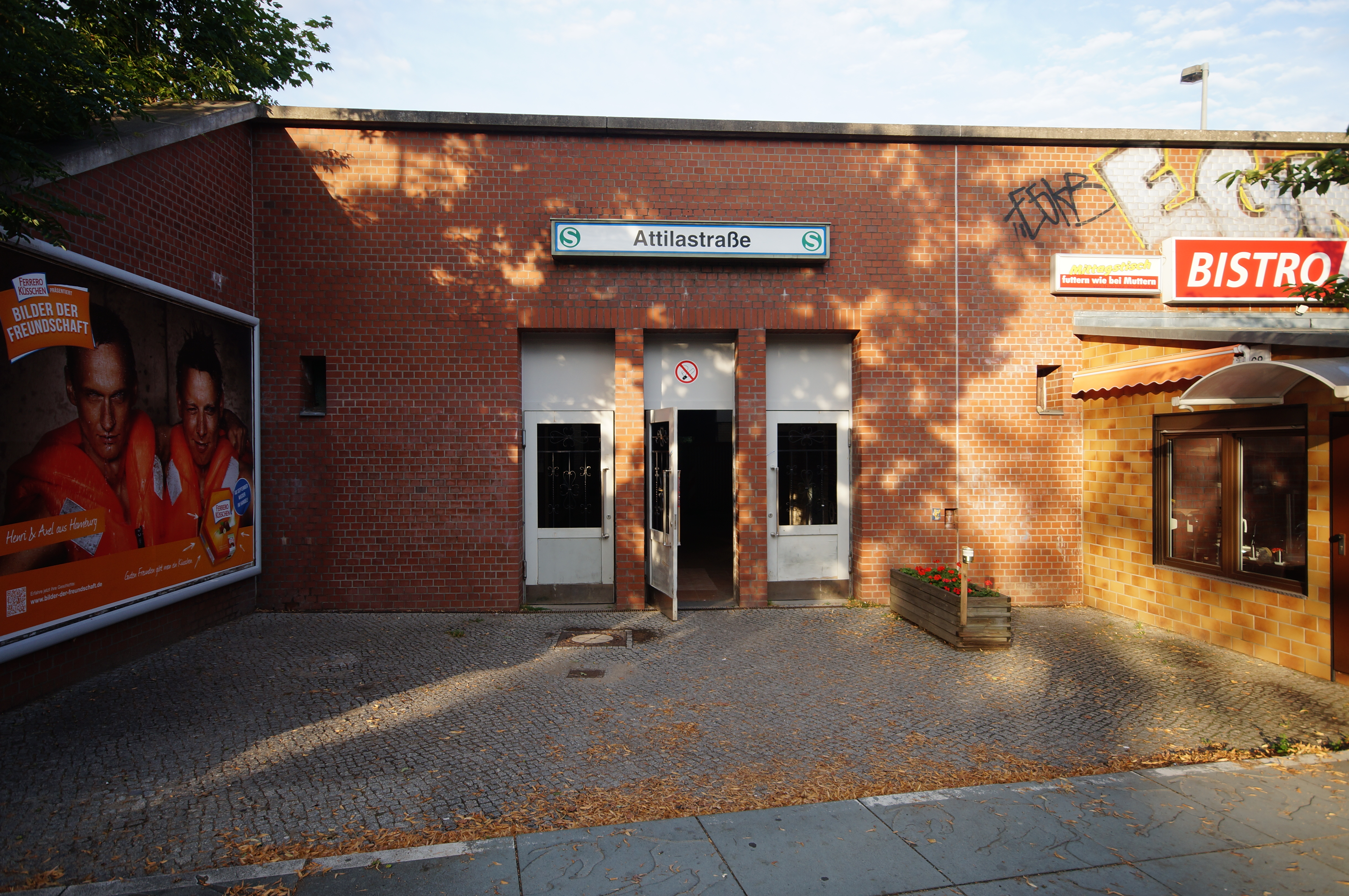
The western entrance of the station

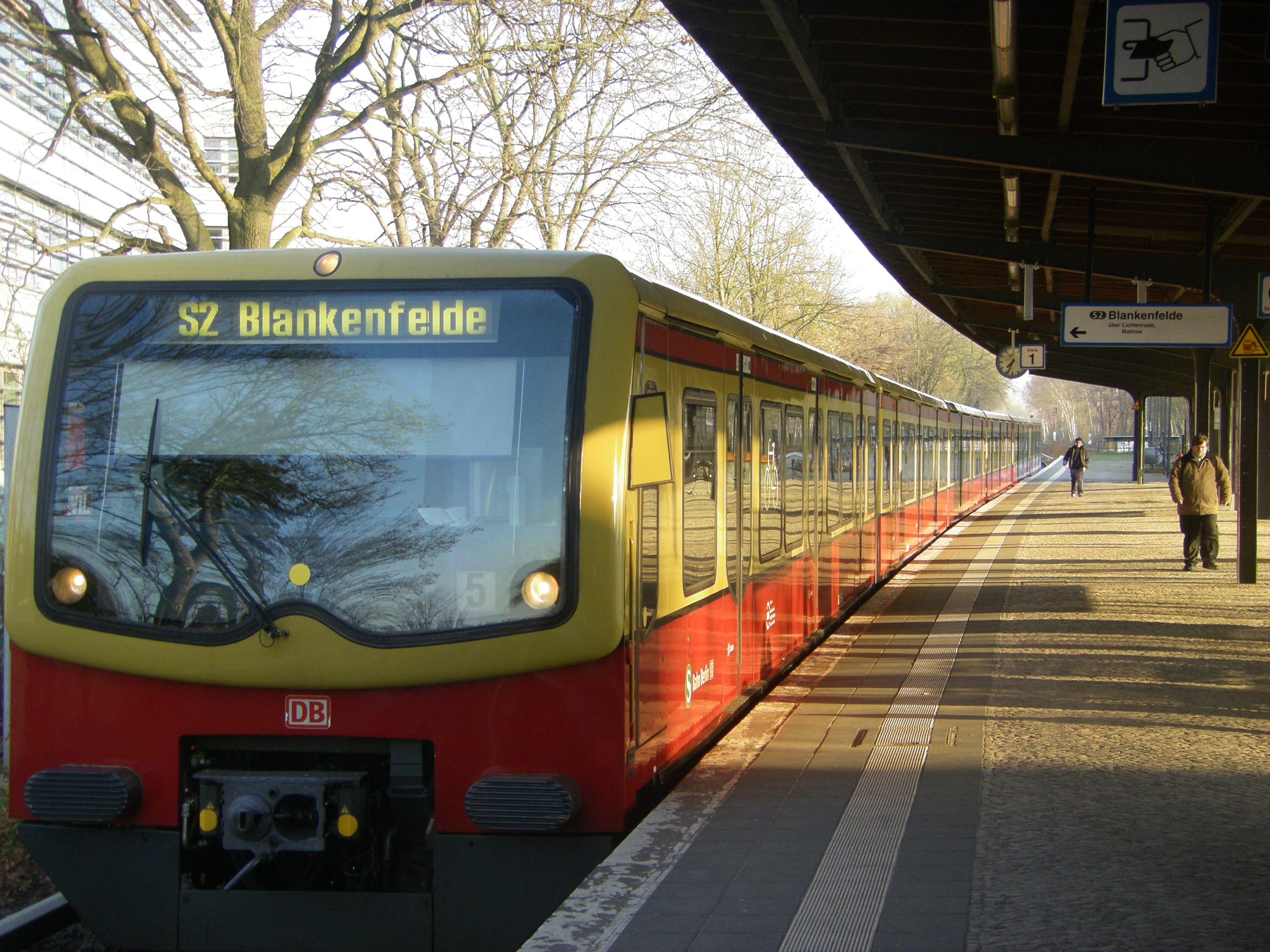
Train of line S2 to Blankenfelde in Attilastraße station

The station is built in the style of early modernism and consists of an island platform located on an embankment with an entrance at the south end of the platform. The ticket hall is built on the abutment of the bridge over Attilastraße (street). In the station area, a track that is used for freight runs to the east of the S-Bahn tracks. It connects with the S-Bahn track the south of the platform. The former facilities on the platform were replaced in 1979 by a new service area on the staircase.

Work began in December 2013 to build a lift to provide the station with barrier-free access. It was scheduled to be opened in July 2014 but it actually opened in September 2014.

== Connections ==
The station is served by S-Bahn line S2. There are interchanges with bus routes 184 and 282 operated by the Berliner Verkehrsbetriebe.

== See also ==
- List of railway stations in Berlin
