= Berlin Südkreuz station =

Railway station in Berlin

Berlin Südkreuz
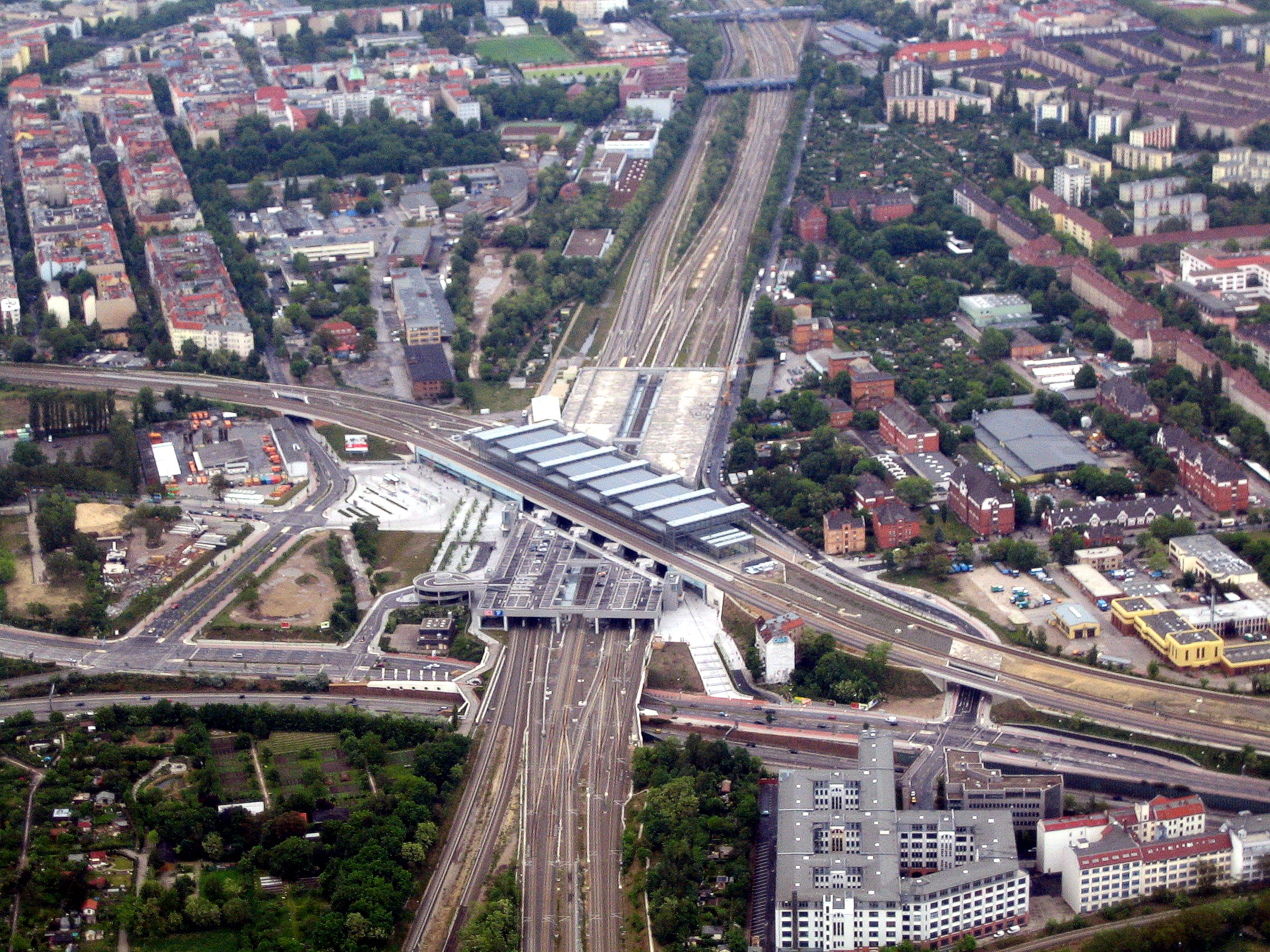
- Berlin Südkreuz looking north

General information
- Location: General-Pape-Straße, 10829, Tempelhof-Schöneberg, Berlin; Germany
- Coordinates: 52°28′32″N 13°21′52″E
- Owner: Deutsche Bahn
- Operator: DB InfraGO
- Lines: North–South mainline (KBS 203, 204, 205); Anhalt Suburban Line (KBS 200.2, 200.25); Ringbahn (KBS 200.41, 200.42, 200.46)
- Platforms: 8

Construction
- Accessible: Yes

Other information
- Station code: 4859
- DS100 code: BSKR (S-Bahn, upper); BPAF (long-distance, lower); BSKV (S-Bahn, lower)
- IBNR: 8011113 (long-distance); 8089073 (S-Bahn)
- Category: 1
- Fare zone: : Berlin A/5555
- Website: www.bahnhof.de

History
- Opened: 1898; 128 years ago
- Former names: Berlin Papestraße (1898-2006)

Key dates
- 1990s–2006: Rebuilt as Südkreuz
Services
Preceding station	DB Fernverkehr	Following station
Berlin Hbf towards Frankfurt Airport Regional or Saarbrücken Hbf	ICE 3 Sprinter	Terminus
Berlin Hbf towards Berlin Gesundbrunnen	ICE 6 Sprinter	Nürnberg Hbf towards Stuttgart Hbf
Berlin Hbf towards Bonn Hbf	ICE 9 Sprinter	Terminus
Berlin Hbf towards Berlin Gesundbrunnen	ICE 11	Lutherstadt Wittenberg Hbf towards München Hbf
Berlin Hbf towards Ostseebad Binz	ICE 15	Halle (Saale) Hbf towards Saarbrücken Hbf
Berlin Hbf towards Oldenburg Hbf	ICE 16	Terminus
Berlin Hbf towards Rostock Hbf	IC 17	BER Airport towards Chemnitz Hbf
Berlin Hbf towards Berlin Gesundbrunnen, Hamburg-Altona or Westerland (Sylt)	ICE 18	Lutherstadt Wittenberg Hbf towards München Hbf
Berlin Hbf towards Berlin Gesundbrunnen, Hamburg-Altona or Westerland (Sylt)	ICE 18	Halle (Saale) Hbf towards München Hbf
Berlin Hbf towards Hamburg-Altona	RJ 27	Dresden-Neustadt towards Praha hl.n., Budapest Nyugati or Wien Hbf
Berlin Hbf towards København H	RJ 27	Dresden-Neustadt towards Praha hl.n.
Berlin Hbf towards Kiel Hbf	RJ 27	Dresden-Neustadt towards Praha hl.n.
Berlin Hbf towards Hamburg-Altona or Kiel Hbf	ICE 28	Lutherstadt Wittenberg Hbf towards München Hbf
Berlin Hbf towards Rostock Hbf	ICE 29 Sprinter	Halle (Saale) Hbf towards München Hbf
Berlin Hbf towards Berlin Gesundbrunnen	ICE 91	Halle (Saale) Hbf towards Wien Hbf
Preceding station		Following station
Berlin Hbf towards Aachen Hbf	FLX 30	Leipzig Hbf Terminus
Preceding station	DB Regio Nordost	Following station
Berlin Potsdamer Platz towards Berlin Hbf	Flughafen-Express	BER Airport Terminus
Berlin Potsdamer Platz towards Stralsund Hbf or Schwedt	RE 3	Berlin-Lichterfelde Ost towards Jüterbog or Lutherstadt Wittenberg Hbf
Berlin Potsdamer Platz towards Rathenow or Stendal Hbf	RE 4	Berlin-Lichterfelde Ost towards Jüterbog or Falkenberg (Elster)
Berlin Potsdamer Platz towards Rostock Hbf or Stralsund Hbf	RE 5	Terminus
Berlin Potsdamer Platz towards Berlin Hbf	RE 20	BER Airport towards Lübbenau (Spreewald) or Cottbus Hbf
Berlin Potsdamer Platz towards Nauen	RB 10	Terminus
Preceding station	Ostdeutsche Eisenbahn	Following station
Berlin Potsdamer Platz towards Wismar	RE 8	Berlin-Lichterfelde Ost towards Elsterwerda
Preceding station	Berlin S-Bahn	Following station
Yorckstraße towards Bernau	S2	Priesterweg towards Blankenfelde
Yorckstraße towards Hennigsdorf	S25	Priesterweg towards Teltow Stadt
Yorckstraße towards Blankenburg	S26	Priesterweg towards Teltow Stadt
Tempelhof One-way operation	S41	Schöneberg Ringbahn (clockwise)
Tempelhof Ringbahn (counter-clockwise)	S42	Schöneberg One-way operation
Terminus	S45	Tempelhof towards BER Airport
Schöneberg towards Westend	S46	Tempelhof towards Königs Wusterhausen
Location

Berlin Südkreuz station (German: Bahnhof Berlin Südkreuz, lit. 'Berlin South Cross') is a railway station in the German capital Berlin. The station was originally opened in 1898 and is an interchange station. The Berlin Ringbahn line of the Berlin S-Bahn metro railway is situated on the upper level and connects to the east and west, whilst the Anhalter Bahn and Dresdner Bahn intercity railway routes reach the station on the lower, north-south level. The station was extensively rebuilt between the late 1990s and 2006, and was renamed Berlin Südkreuz on 28 May 2006.

== History ==
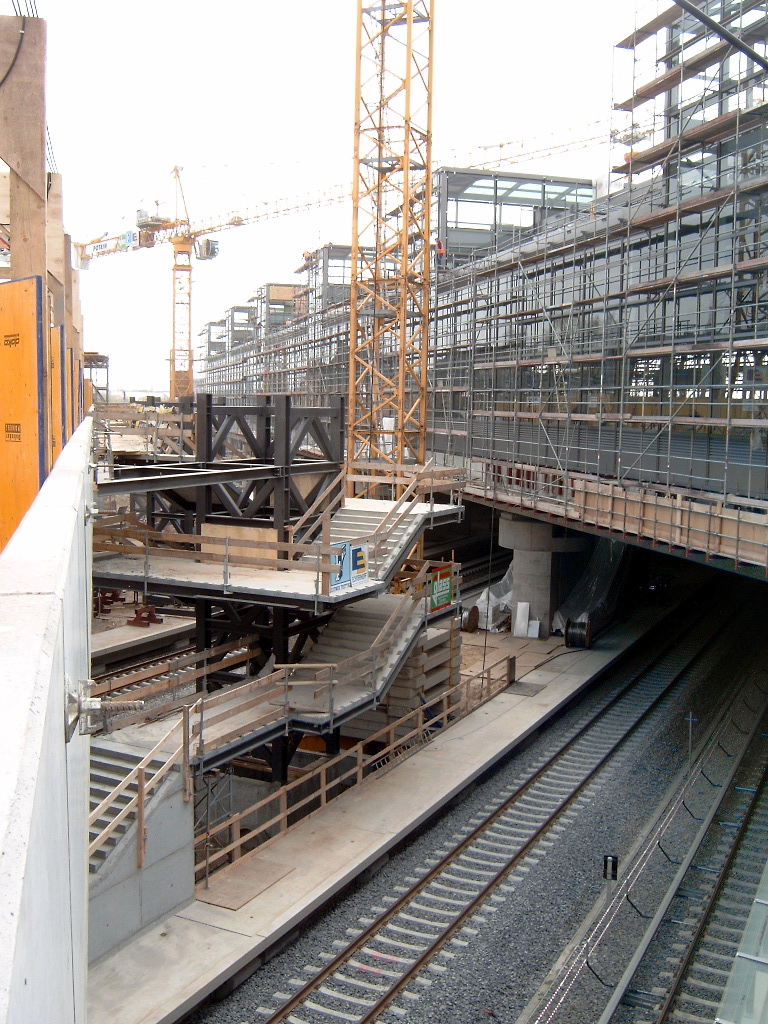
Construction works in 2005

The station's original name (Berlin Papestraße) originates from the nearby General-Pape-Straße, which is named after the Prussian general Alexander August Wilhelm von Pape. The Ringbahn platform opened as an island platform on 1 December 1901.

The original Papestraße station building, constructed from 1898 to 1901 was demolished, although a corner of the building, incorporating a clock tower, has been preserved as part of the new station.

=== Becoming Südkreuz ===
The station played a vital part in Deutsche Bahn's new concept for long-distance services in Berlin; it was deemed necessary to have a long-distance station in southern Berlin for the new north-south axis, so it was decided to rebuild Papestraße and rename the station to Südkreuz, giving the station a more intuitive name like the Ostkreuz (East Cross) and Westkreuz (West Cross) stations on the Berlin Stadtbahn. Construction, however, was severely delayed due to unexpected difficulties and NIMBY complaints of residents living near the long-disused north-south lines. Instead of opening in 2000 as scheduled, the station only opened on 28 May 2006, together with the new Berlin Hauptbahnhof (Berlin Main Station) in the center of Berlin. It is now used as a terminal station for ICE trains to Hamburg Hauptbahnhof, and sees a number of north-south services heading to and from Leipzig Hauptbahnhof or Halle Hauptbahnhof plus EuroCity services to the Czech Republic, Hungary and Slovakia via Dresden Hauptbahnhof.

Since upgrades on the Berlin-Dresden railway, the airport express (FEX) runs via Südkreuz.

== Facial recognition trial ==
During 2017 Germany's Ministry of the Interior announced a pilot project to employ facial recognition technology at Berlin Südkreuz station. The six-month trial will overlay facial recognition software over the station's existing video surveillance system and will track a database of volunteers. The project is being jointly undertaken by the Ministry of the Interior, the Federal Police, the Federal Criminal Police Office and Deutsche Bahn. Announcing the pilot, the ministry said the technology would be able to detect people in need of help, as well as suspicious behaviour, and report it automatically.

== Train services ==
In the 2026 timetable the following lines stop at the station:

=== Long distance ===
Line	Route		Frequency
ICE 3	Saarbrücken – Kaiserslautern – Mannheim –	Frankfurt – Berlin-Spandau – Berlin – Berlin Südkreuz	Every four hours
ICE 3	Frankfurt Airport Regional –	Frankfurt – Berlin-Spandau – Berlin – Berlin Südkreuz	Every four hours
ICE 6	Berlin Gesundbrunnen – Berlin – Berlin Südkreuz – Nuremberg – Stuttgart		Once a day
ICE 9	Bonn – Cologne – Berlin-Spandau – Berlin – Berlin Südkreuz		Twice a day
ICE 11	Berlin Gesundbrunnen – Berlin – Berlin Südkreuz – Leipzig – Erfurt – Frankfurt – Mannheim – Stuttgart – Augsburg – Munich		Every two hours
ICE 15	Binz – Stralsund – Berlin – Berlin Südkreuz – Halle – Erfurt – Frankfurt – Darmstadt – Mannheim – Kaiserslautern – Saarbrücken		Every two hours
ICE 16	Oldenburg – Bremen – Hanover – Berlin – Berlin Südkreuz		Every four hours
IC 17	Rostock – Waren – Neustrelitz – Berlin Hbf – Berlin Südkreuz – BER Airport – Dresden – Chemnitz		Every two hours
ICE 18	Westerland – Hamburg – Berlin Hbf – Berlin Südkreuz – Halle – Erfurt – Nuremberg – Augsburg – Munich		Every 2 hours
RJ 27	Hamburg-Altona/Copenhagen/Kiel – Hamburg – Berlin Hbf – Berlin Südkreuz – Dresden – Prague (– Brno – Břeclav –)	Bratislava – Budapest Keleti	Every 2 hours
RJ 27	Hamburg-Altona/Copenhagen/Kiel – Hamburg – Berlin Hbf – Berlin Südkreuz – Dresden – Prague (– Brno – Břeclav –)	Vienna	Every 2 hours
ICE 28	(Kiel^{1} –) Hamburg – Berlin Hbf – Berlin Südkreuz – Leipzig – Erfurt – Nuremberg – Ingolstadt – Munich		Every 2 hours
ICE 29	Berlin Hbf – Berlin Südkreuz – Halle – Erfurt – Nuremberg – Munich		5 train pairs
ICE 91	(Rostock –) Berlin Hbf – Berlin Südkreuz – Halle – Erfurt – Nürnberg – Regensburg – Passau – Linz – Vienna		1 train pair
FLX 30	Leipzig – Berlin Südkreuz – Berlin Hbf – Berlin-Spandau – Hannover – Bielefeld – Dortmund – Essen – Duisburg – Düsseldorf – Cologne – Aachen		1 train pair
Notes.	1 = one train pair		

=== Regional ===
Line	Route		Frequency
FEX	Airport Express; Berlin Hauptbahnhof – Potsdamer Platz – Südkreuz – BER Airport		Every 15 mins
RE 3	Lutherstadt Wittenberg – Jüterbog – Südkreuz – Eberswalde – Angermünde –	Schwedt (Oder)	Hourly
RE 3	Lutherstadt Wittenberg – Jüterbog – Südkreuz – Eberswalde – Angermünde –	Prenzlau – Greifswald – Stralsund	Hourly
RE 4	(Falkenberg (Elster) –) Jüterbog – Ludwigsfelde – Südkreuz – Spandau – Dallgow-Döberitz – Wustermark – Rathenow (– Stendal)		Hourly
RE 5	Südkreuz – Potsdamer Platz – Berlin Gesundbrunnen – Oranienburg – Neustrelitz –	Güstrow – Rostock	Hourly
RE 5	Südkreuz – Potsdamer Platz – Berlin Gesundbrunnen – Oranienburg – Neustrelitz –	Neubrandenburg – Stralsund	Hourly
RE 8	Wismar – Schwerin – Wittenberge – Nauen – Berlin-Spandau – Berlin Hauptbahnhof – Potsdamer Platz – Südkreuz – Wünsdorf-Waldstadt – Luckau-Uckro – Finsterwalde (Niederlausitz)		Hourly
RE 20	Berlin Hbf – Potsdamer Platz – Südkreuz – BER Airport – Königs Wusterhausen – Lübbenau (Spreewald) (– Vetschau – Cottbus)		Hourly
RB 10	Rangsdorf – Blankenfelde – Südkreuz – Potsdamer Platz – Berlin Hauptbahnhof – Jungfernheide – Spandau – Falkensee – Nauen		Hourly
As of 14 December 2025

=== S-Bahn ===
- Berlin S-Bahn services Bernau - Karow - Pankow - Gesundbrunnen - Friedrichstraße - Potsdamer Platz - Südkreuz - Blankenfelde
- Berlin S-Bahn services Hennigsdorf - Tegel - Gesundbrunnen - Friedrichstraße - Potsdamer Platz - Südkreuz - Lichterfelde - Teltow
- Berlin S-Bahn services Blankenburg - Pankow - Gesundbrunnen - Friedrichstraße - Potsdamer Platz - Südkreuz - Lichterfelde - Teltow
- Berlin S-Bahn services (Ring Clockwise) Südkreuz - Innsbrucker Platz - Westkreuz - Westend - Jungfernheide - Gesundbrunnen - Ostkreuz - Treptower Park - Hermannstraße - Südkreuz
- Berlin S-Bahn services (Ring Anti-clockwise) Südkreuz - Hermannstraße - Treptower Park - Ostkreuz - Gesundbrunnen - Jungfernheide - Westend - Westkreuz - Innsbrucker Platz - Südkreuz
- Berlin S-Bahn services Südkreuz - Neukölln - Schöneweide - Berlin-Brandenburg Airport (T1-T2)
- Berlin S-Bahn services Westend - Westkreuz - Innsbrucker Platz - Südkreuz - Neukölln - Schöneweide - Grünau - Königs Wusterhausen

== See also ==
- List of railway stations in the Berlin area
- Rail transport in Germany
