= Priesterweg station =

Railway station in Berlin, Germany

Priesterweg
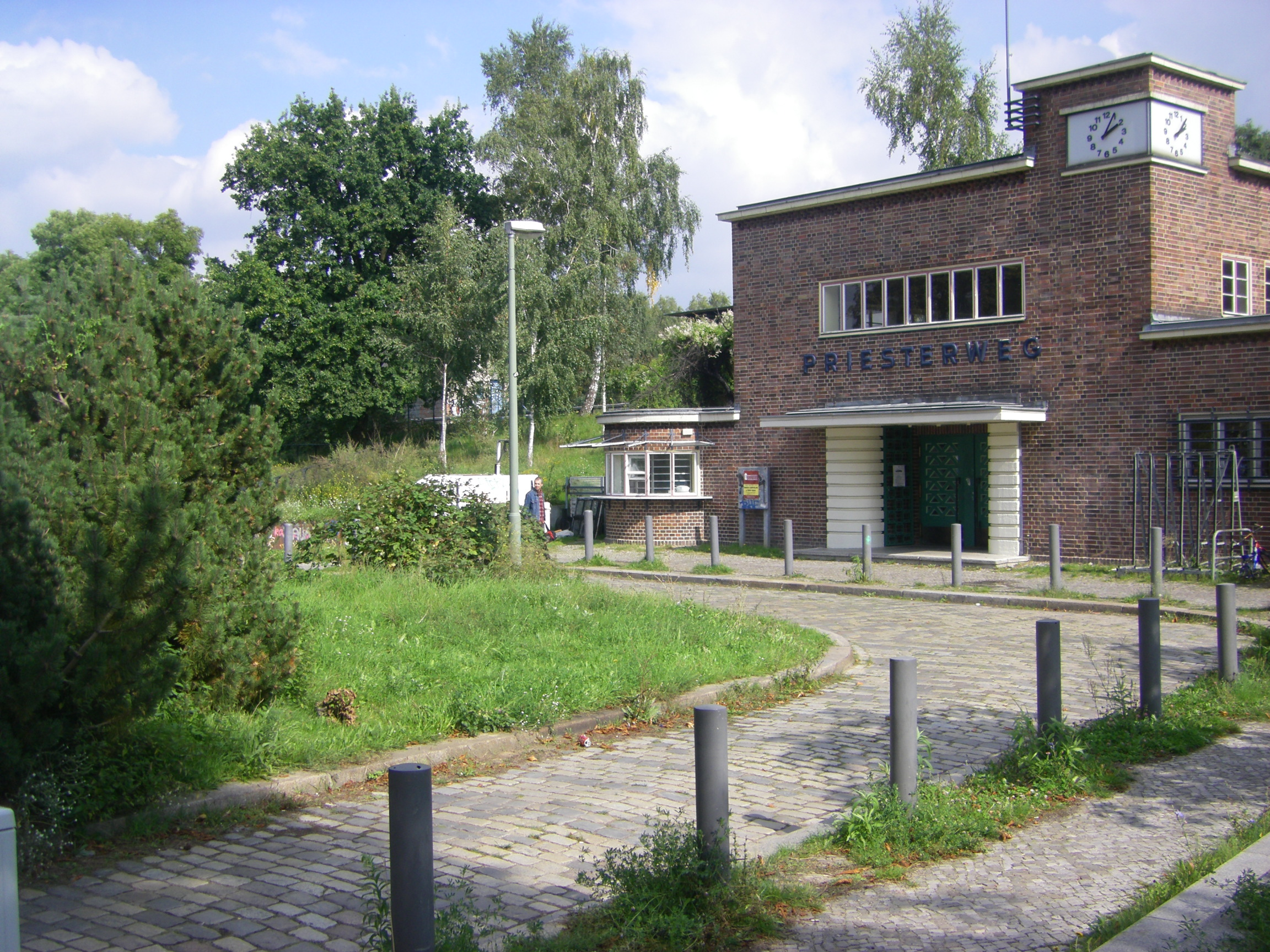
- Station building

General information
- Location: Priesterweg, Schöneberg, Tempelhof-Schöneberg, Berlin; Germany
- Coordinates: 52°27′36″N 13°21′23″E
- Owner: DB Netz
- Operator: DB Station&Service
- Lines: Anhalt Suburban Line; Berlin–Dresden railway
- Platforms: 2 island platforms
- Tracks: 4

Construction
- Accessible: Yes
- Architect: Günther Lüttich
- Architectural style: Expressionism

Other information
- Station code: 5036
- DS100 code: BPRS
- IBNR: 8089034
- Category: 4
- Fare zone: VBB: Berlin B/5656
- Website: www.bahnhof.de

History
- Opened: 7 October 1928; 97 years ago

Services
Preceding station	Berlin S-Bahn	Following station
Südkreuz towards Bernau	S2	Attilastraße towards Blankenfelde
Südkreuz towards Hennigsdorf	S25	Südende towards Teltow Stadt
Südkreuz towards Blankenburg	S26	Südende towards Teltow Stadt
Location
- Location within Berlin

Priesterweg station is on the Anhalt Suburban Line in the district of Schöneberg in the Berlin borough of Tempelhof-Schöneberg. It is served by Berlin S-Bahn lines S2, S25, and S26.

== Location ==
The station is located in the district of Schöneberg in Tempelhof-Schöneberg. The Berlin city center lies 8 km to the northeast. It fronts onto the streets of Priesterweg and Prellerweg to the west. Located east of the station on former rail yards is the Natur-Park Schöneberger Südgelände (South Grounds Nature Park). Southwest is the Insulaner (literally “islanders”, which was derived from the name of a cabaret program broadcast on Rundfunk im amerikanischen Sektor during the Berlin Blockade), a hill formed of rubble created by Second World War bombing raids, which the Wilhelm Foerster Observatory is located on. Südkreuz station is located about 1.8 kilometres to the north, Attilastraße station is about 1.3 km to the south and Südende station is about 1.4 km to the south. The station is located in the Berlin B fare zone of the Verkehrsverbund Berlin-Brandenburg.

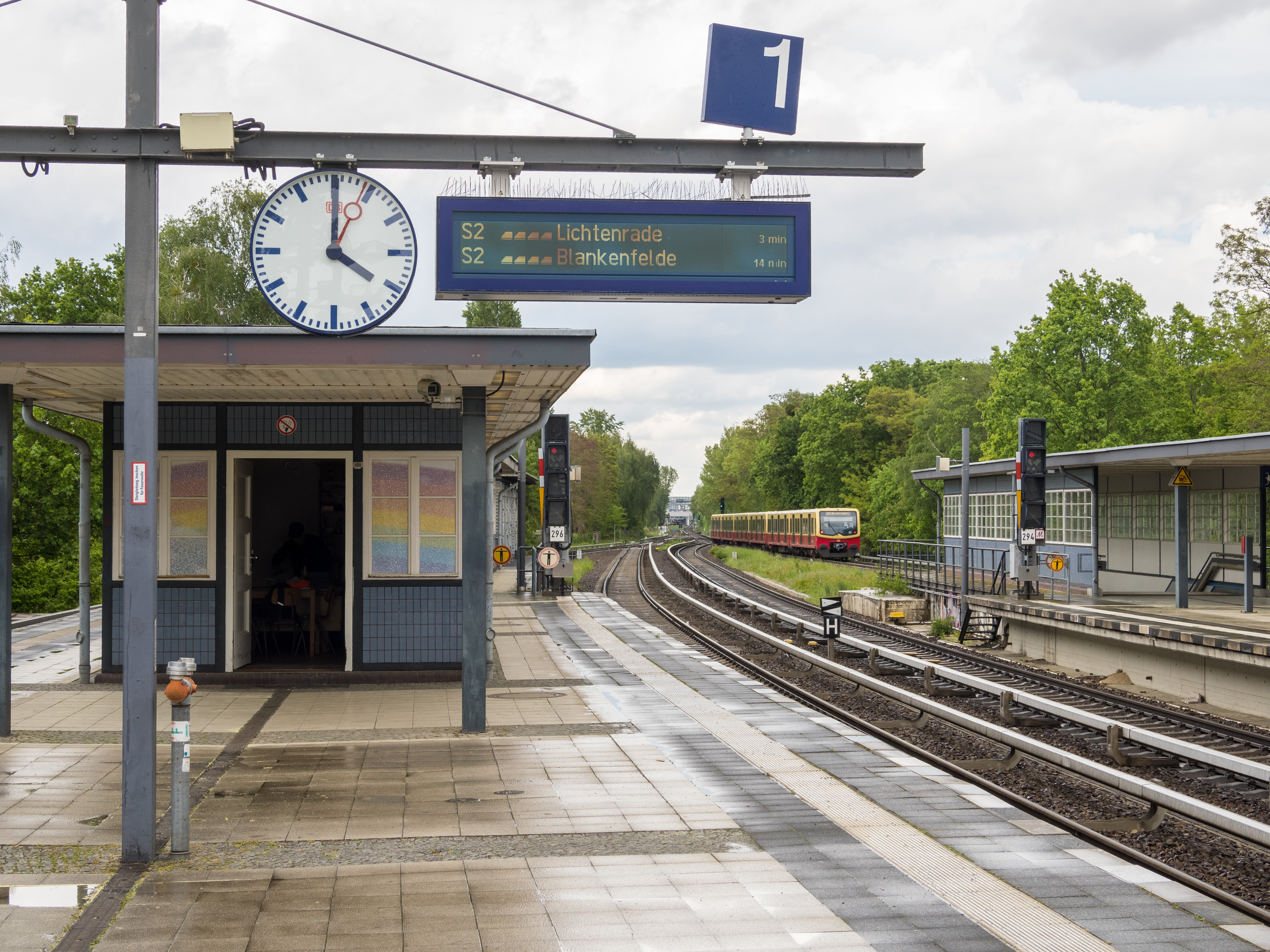
On the platform at Priesterweg station

== History ==
The station was opened on 7 October 1928. There were initially two island platforms. Electrification on the current S-Bahn system commenced on 2 July 1929. Before that time, there were electrical test operations using a 550 V DC system. Since 15 May 1939, the station has been served exclusively by electric powered S-Bahn trains. A second entrance was built and the entire station was modernised. Rail services were abandoned towards the end of the Second World War in April 1945.

The station was reopened for steam-powered trains on 8 June 1945. Electrical operations were resumed on 16 August 1945.

Following the takeover of the S-Bahn by the Berliner Verkehrsbetriebe (BVG, Berlin Transportation Company) on 9 January 1984, the route to Lichterfelde Süd was shut down. Trains ran only on the outer tracks. In May 1990, platform A was taken out of service and trains stopped at platform B only. Platform A was demolished and rebuilt a little further south; it was put back into service on 29 June 1992. After that, platform B was similarly rebuilt. The old entrance and the station building have been preserved, but they now lie at the northern end of the platform. A new southern entrance to platform A was opened on 3 August 1993. The newly built platform B eventually went into operation on 6 December 1993. Since then, the station has been partly covered. A new southern entrance for platform B was completed in January 1995.

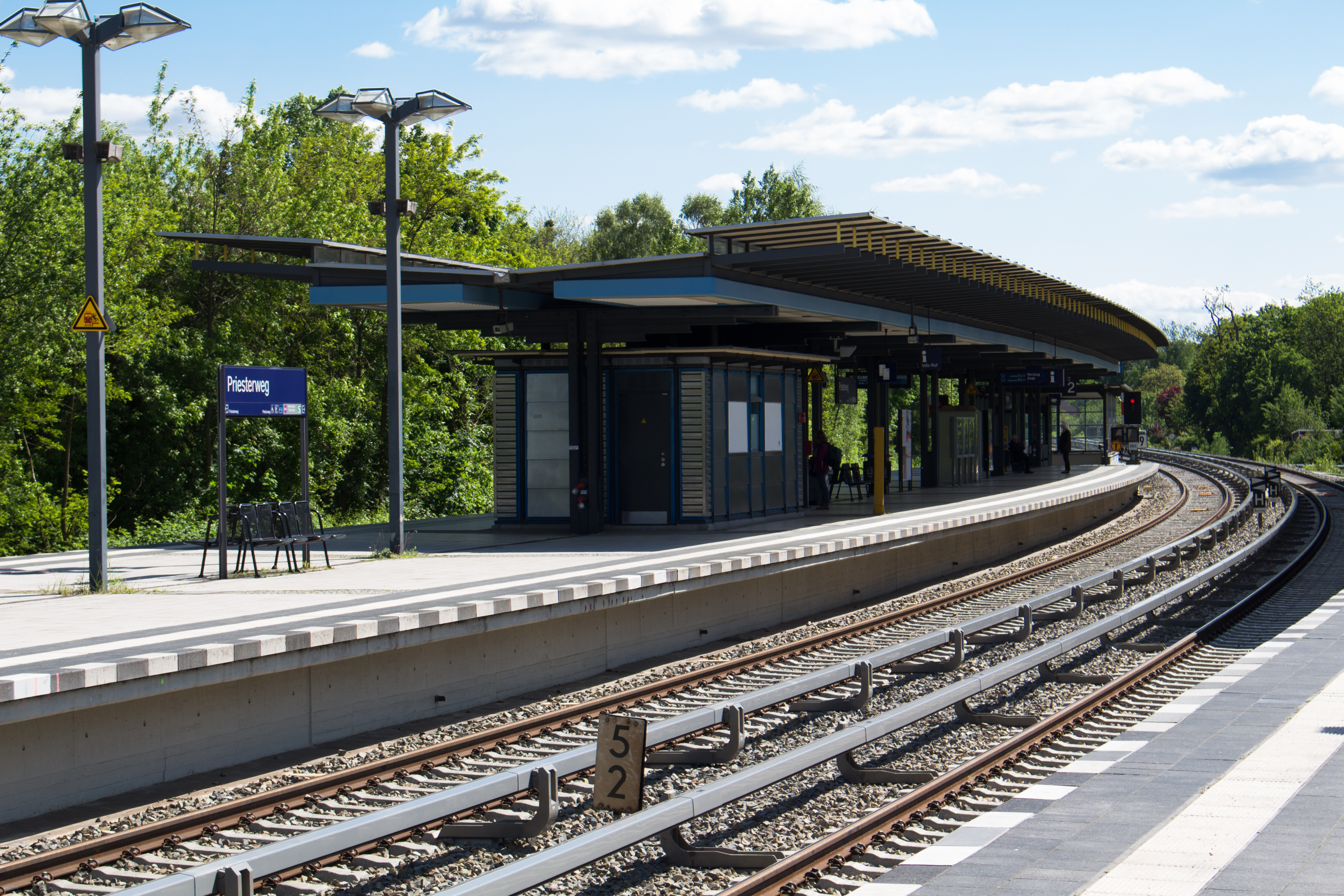
The platforms in May 2014

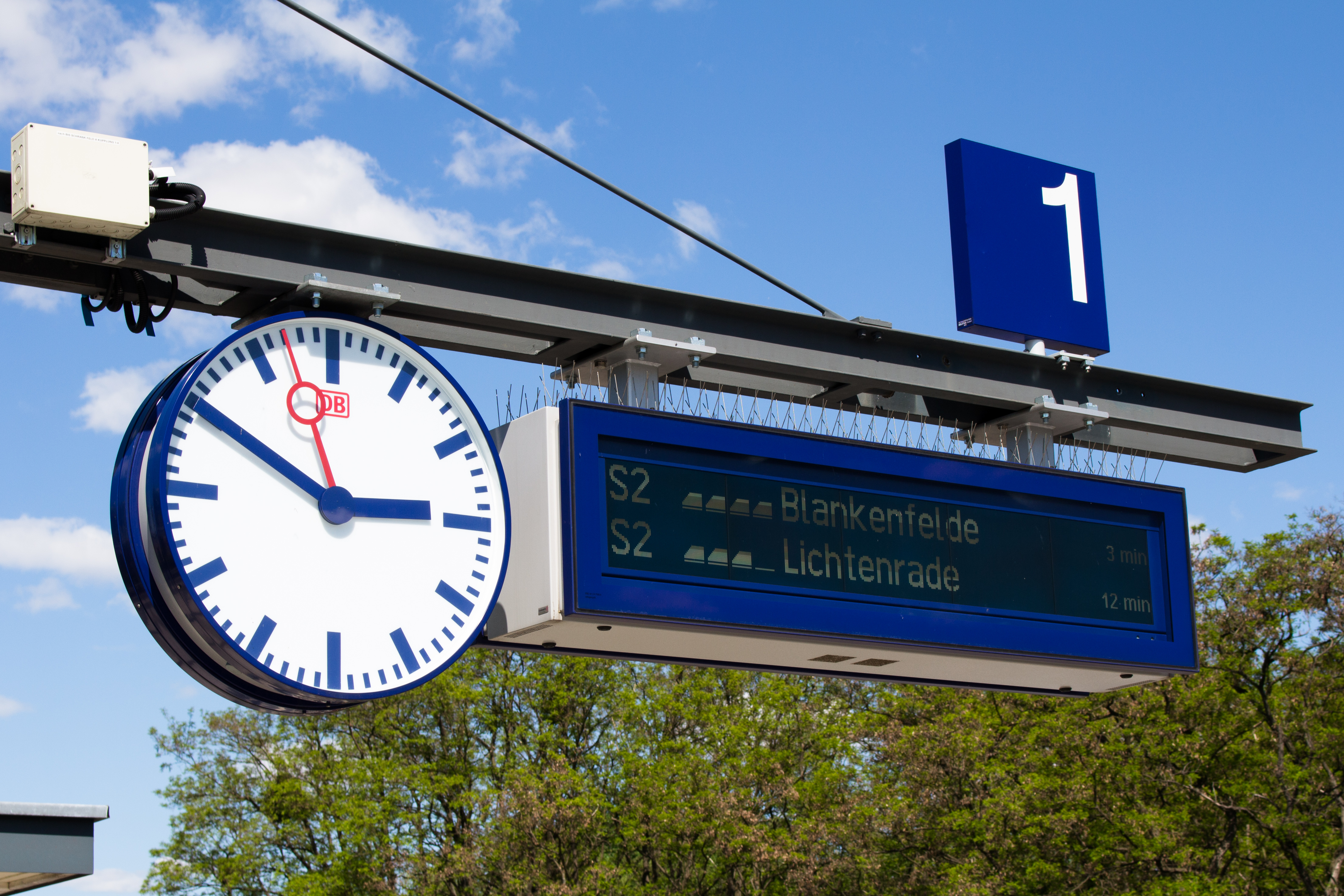
Dynamic destination indicator in May 2014

== Connections ==
The station is served by Berlin S-Bahn lines S2, S25, and S26. There are interchanges with the following bus routes operated by the Berliner Verkehrsbetriebe.

Line	Route
M76	Lichtenrade – Walther Schreiber Platz
X76	Lichtenrade, Nahariyastraße – Walther Schreiber Platz
170	Baumschulenstraße/Fähre – Rathaus Steglitz
246	Hermannstraße – Friedrich-Wilhelm-Platz

== See also ==
- List of railway stations in Berlin
