= Berlin-Pankow-Heinersdorf station =

Railway station in Berlin, Germany

Coordinates: 52.5780653°N 13.4295093°E

Pankow-Heinersdorf
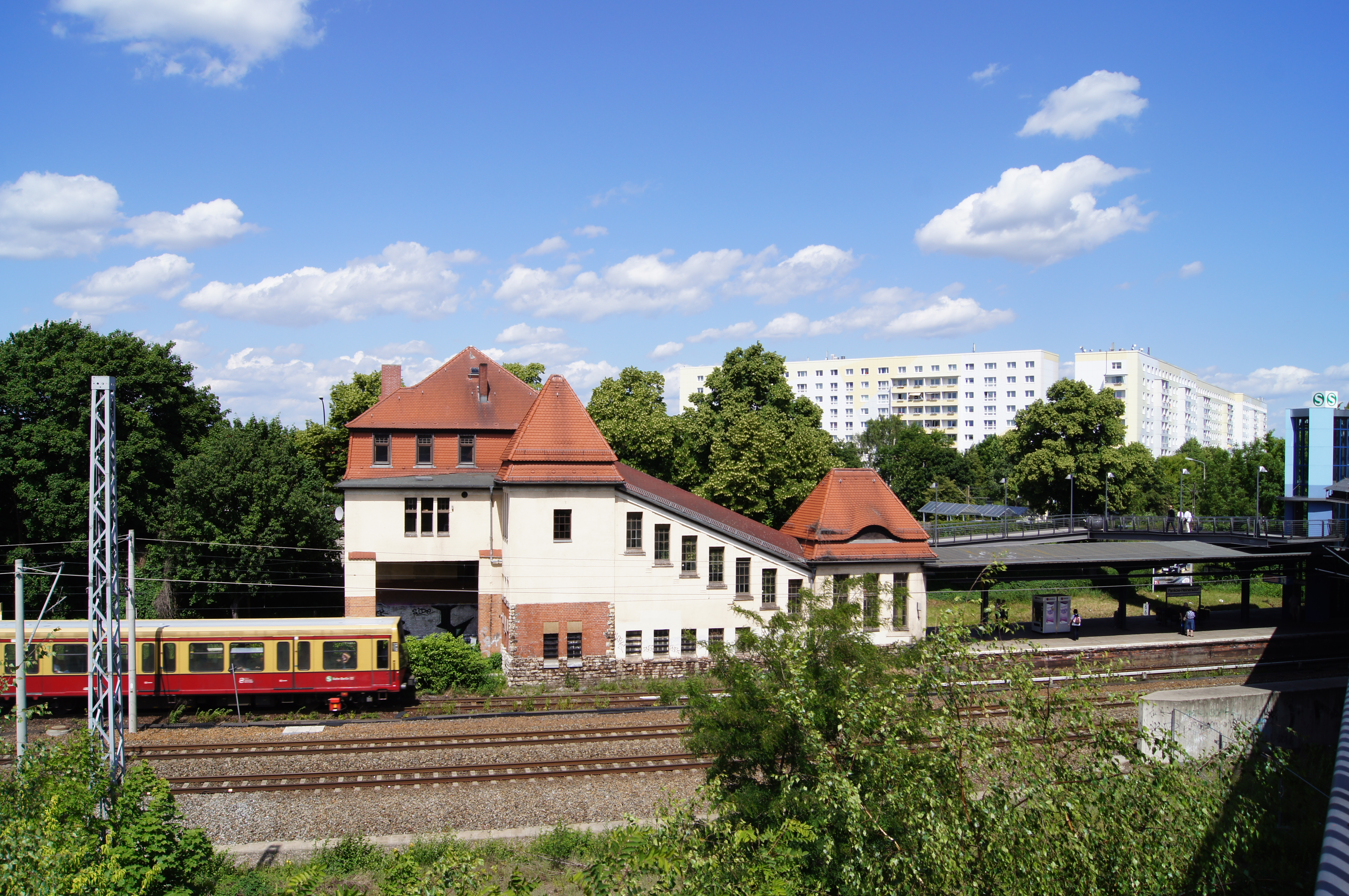

General information
- Location: Pankow, Berlin, Berlin; Germany
- Line: Stettin railway

Construction
- Architect: Alfred Lücking, Karl Cornelius and Ernst Schwartz

Other information
- Station code: 4854
- DS100 code: BPHD
- Category: 4
- Fare zone: : Berlin B/5656

History
- Opened: 1 October 1893; 132 years ago
- Electrified: 8 August 1924; 102 years ago

Key dates
- 1912-1916: current building erected
- 25 April-11 June 1945: interruption of operation

Services
Preceding station	Berlin S-Bahn	Following station
Blankenburg towards Bernau	S2	Pankow towards Blankenfelde
Blankenburg towards Birkenwerder	S8	Pankow towards Wildau
Blankenburg Terminus	S26	Pankow towards Teltow Stadt
Location

Pankow-Heinersdorf is a railway station in the Pankow district of Berlin. It is served by the S-Bahn lines S2, S8, and S26. It is also served by BVG tram route 50. It serves the Heinersdorf region to the north of the centre of Pankow.

== History ==
Pankow-Heinersdorf station was opened on 1 October 1893. The station was one of the first S-Bahn stations, as S-Bahn services started operated upon the electrification of the line in 1924. On 25 April 1945, the S-Bahn ceased operation as a result of the Soviet invasion of Berlin. Services resumed from Pankow-Heinersdorf on 11 June 1945.

== Services ==
This station is served by the following services:

- Berlin S-Bahn:
  - : Bernau – Karow – Pankow – Gesundbrunnen – Friedrichstraße – Potsdamer Platz – Sudkreuz – Blankenfelde
  - : Birkenwerder - Blankenburg - Pankow - Ostkreuz - Schöneweide - Grünau
  - : Pankow – Gesundbrunnen – Friedrichstraße – Potsdamer Platz – Sudkreuz – Teltow Stadt
