= Südende station =

Railway station in Berlin

Südende
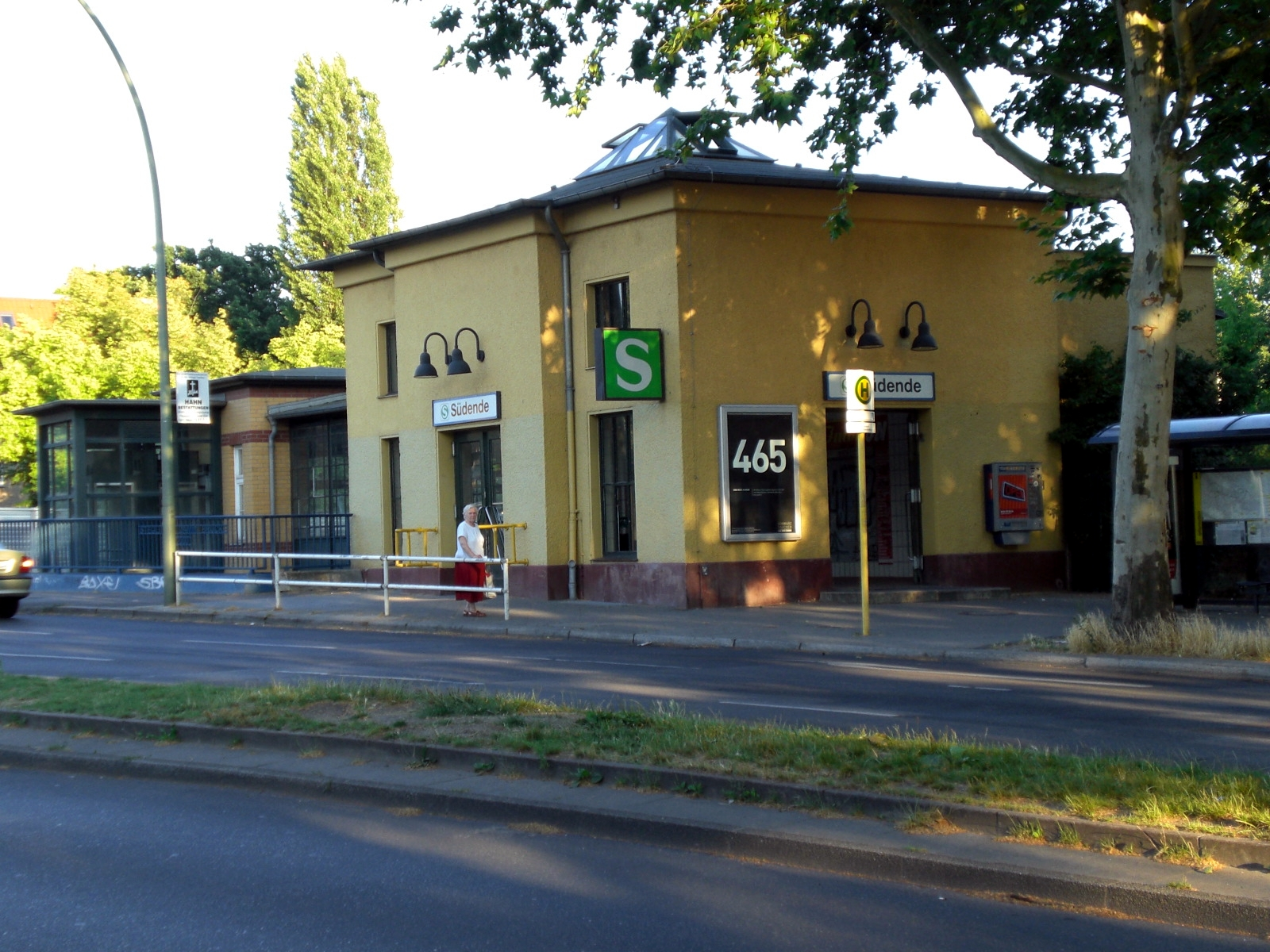
- Station building

General information
- Location: Steglitzer Damm, Steglitz, Steglitz-Zehlendorf, Berlin; Germany
- Coordinates: 52°26′53″N 13°21′13″E
- Line: Anhalt Suburban Line (km 6.5)
- Platforms: 2
- Tracks: 2

Construction
- Accessible: Yes

Other information
- Station code: 7146
- DS100 code: BSDE
- IBNR: 8089115
- Category: 5
- Fare zone: VBB: Berlin B/5656
- Website: sbahn.berlin; www.bahnhof.de

History
- Opened: 15 August 1880; 28 May 1995
- Closed: 9 January 1984
- Former names: Südende-Lankwitz (1882–1899)

Services
Preceding station	Berlin S-Bahn	Following station
Priesterweg towards Hennigsdorf	S25	Lankwitz towards Teltow Stadt
Priesterweg towards Blankenburg	S26	Lankwitz towards Teltow Stadt
Location
- Location within Berlin

Südende station is on the Anhalt Suburban Line in the former villa estate (Villenkolonie) of Südende in the suburb of Steglitz in the Berlin borough of Steglitz-Zehlendorf. It is served by S-Bahn line S25 and S-Bahn line S26. Its entrance is on the street of Steglitzer Damm.

== History ==
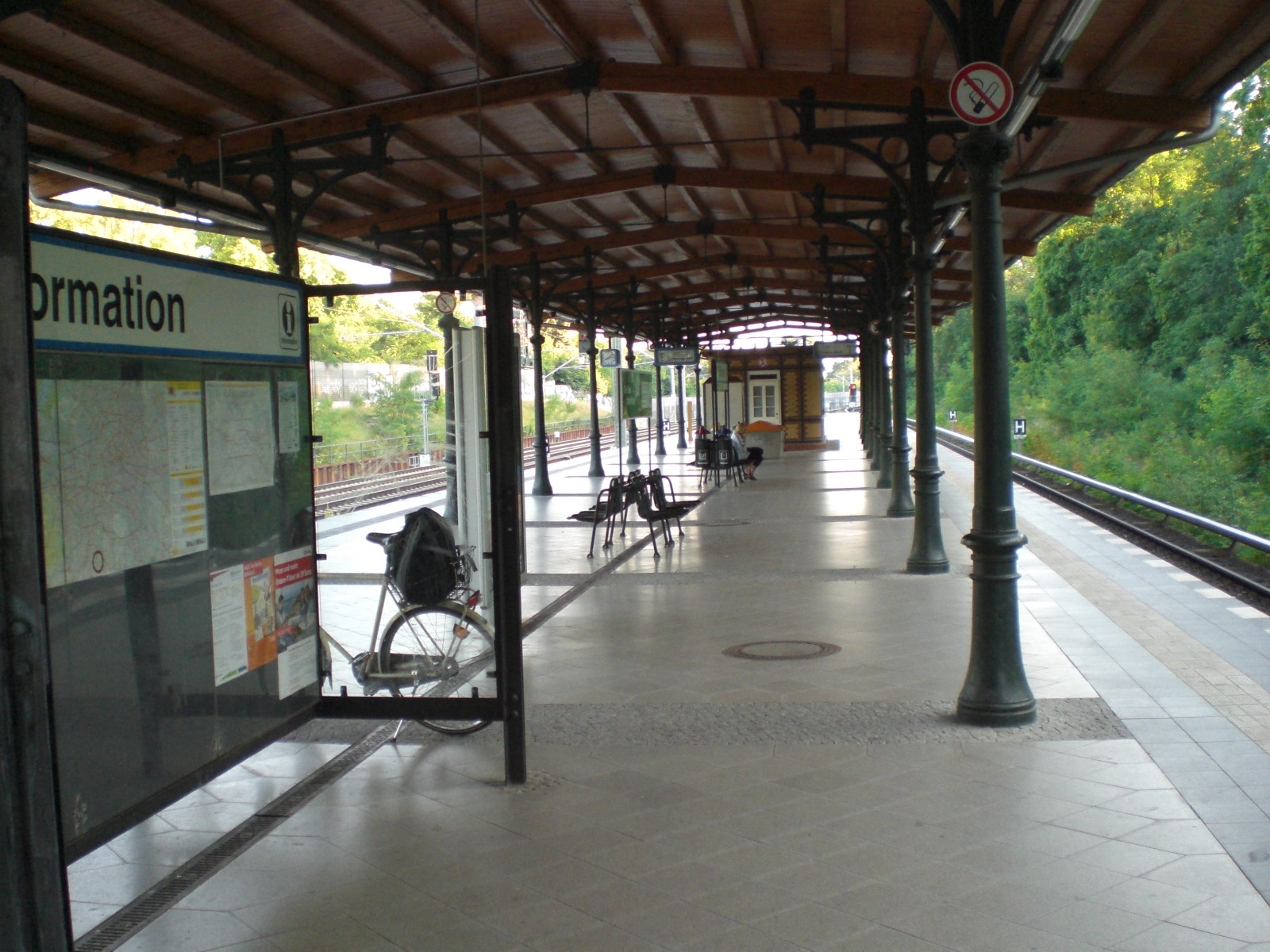
Platform

Südende station was opened on 15 August 1880 on the Anhalt Railway. It was called Südende-Lankwitz between 1882 and 1899. The railway line was lowered in 1901 to run below the Steglitzer Damm and the station was rebuilt with an island platform. This and the station building are located to the southwest of the bridge of the Steglitzer Damm. Since 2 July 1929, the electric trains have operated on the 750 volts DC system of the S-Bahn. Following the takeover of the S-Bahn by the Berliner Verkehrsbetriebe (BVG, Berlin Transportation Company) on 9 January 1984, the route from Priesterweg to Lichterfelde Süd through Lankwitz was shut down. Südende station was reopened after renovation work on 28 May 1995.

== Architecture ==
The station building of 1901 no longer exists. It has been replaced by more recent construction. The island platform has a roof in the classic S-Bahn style: a gabled roof supported by cast-iron columns. The station building and platform are connected by a covered staircase. It is built in the "greenhouse architecture" style. Even the corridor to the lift to the upper level on the Steglitzer Damm, which was built later, was built in a similar style. On the platform there is a building for administration, but it is no longer used.

== Connections ==
The station is served by line S25 and S-Bahn line S26 of the Berlin S-Bahn. There are interchanges with bus route 282 of the Berliner Verkehrsbetriebe.

== See also ==
- List of railway stations in Berlin
