= Berlin-Karow station =

Railway station in Berlin, Germany

Berlin-Karow
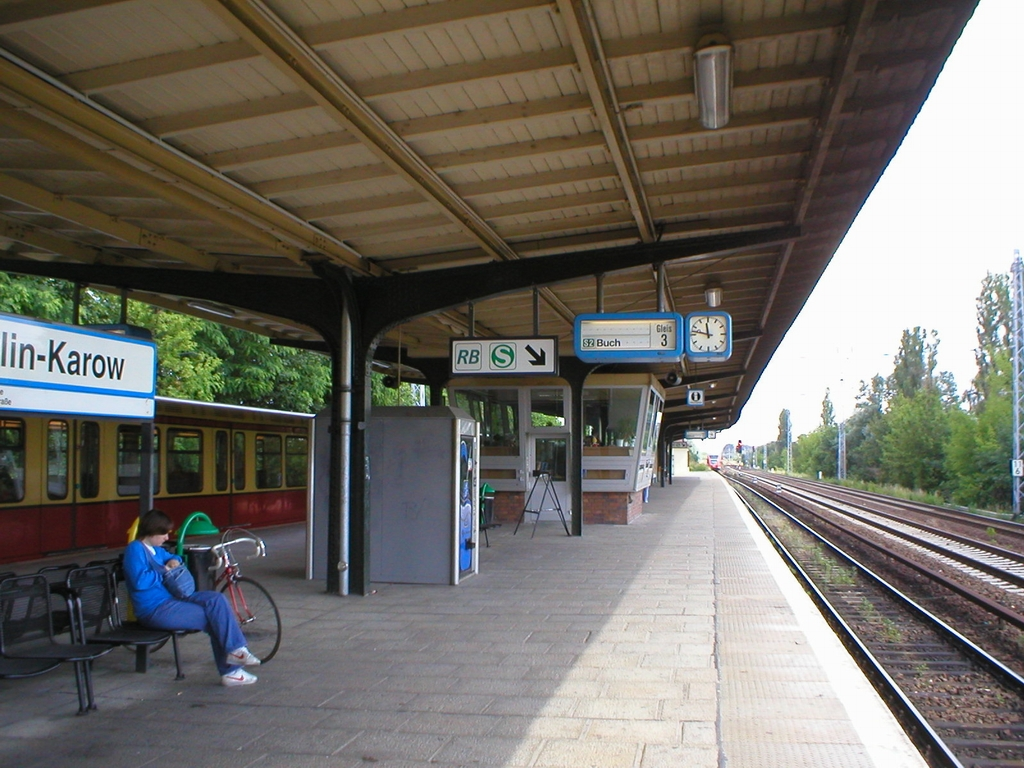
- A platform at Karow station, from which S-Bahn as well as regional trains arrive and depart

General information
- Location: Pankow, Berlin, Berlin; Germany
- Coordinates: 52°36′54″N 13°28′09″E
- Owner: DB Netz
- Operator: DB Station&Service
- Line: Berlin–Szczecin railway
- Platforms: 1 island platform
- Tracks: 2
- Train operators: Niederbarnimer Eisenbahn; S-Bahn Berlin
- Connections: S2

Construction
- Architect: Karl Cornelius

Other information
- Station code: 546
- DS100 code: BKAR
- Category: 5
- Fare zone: : Berlin B/5656
- Website: www.bahnhof.de

History
- Opened: 15 November 1882

Services
| Preceding station | Niederbarnimer Eisenbahn | Following station |
|---|---|---|
| Terminus | RB 27 | Schönerlinde towards Groß Schönebeck or Schmachtenhagen |
| Preceding station | Berlin S-Bahn | Following station |
| Buch towards Bernau | S2 | Blankenburg towards Blankenfelde |
Location
- Location within Berlin

Berlin-Karow station is a railway station on the Berlin–Szczecin railway in the Pankow district of Berlin. It is served by the S-Bahn line S2 and the line NE27 (also known as the Heidekrautbahn), operated by the Niederbarnimer Eisenbahn.

== 2009 Train Collision ==
On 17 April 2009, twenty-four people were injured when a regional train from Stralsund, Mecklenburg-Vorpommern, crashed into a freight train carrying propane, north of Berlin. The passengers and railway staff were hurt in the accident which took place 250m outside of Berlin-Karow railway station. Nine of the injured, five of them in critical condition, were taken to nearby hospitals.
