= Berlin-Tempelhof station =

Railway station in Berlin, Germany

Coordinates: 52°28′14.72″N 13°23′07.26″E

Berlin Tempelhof
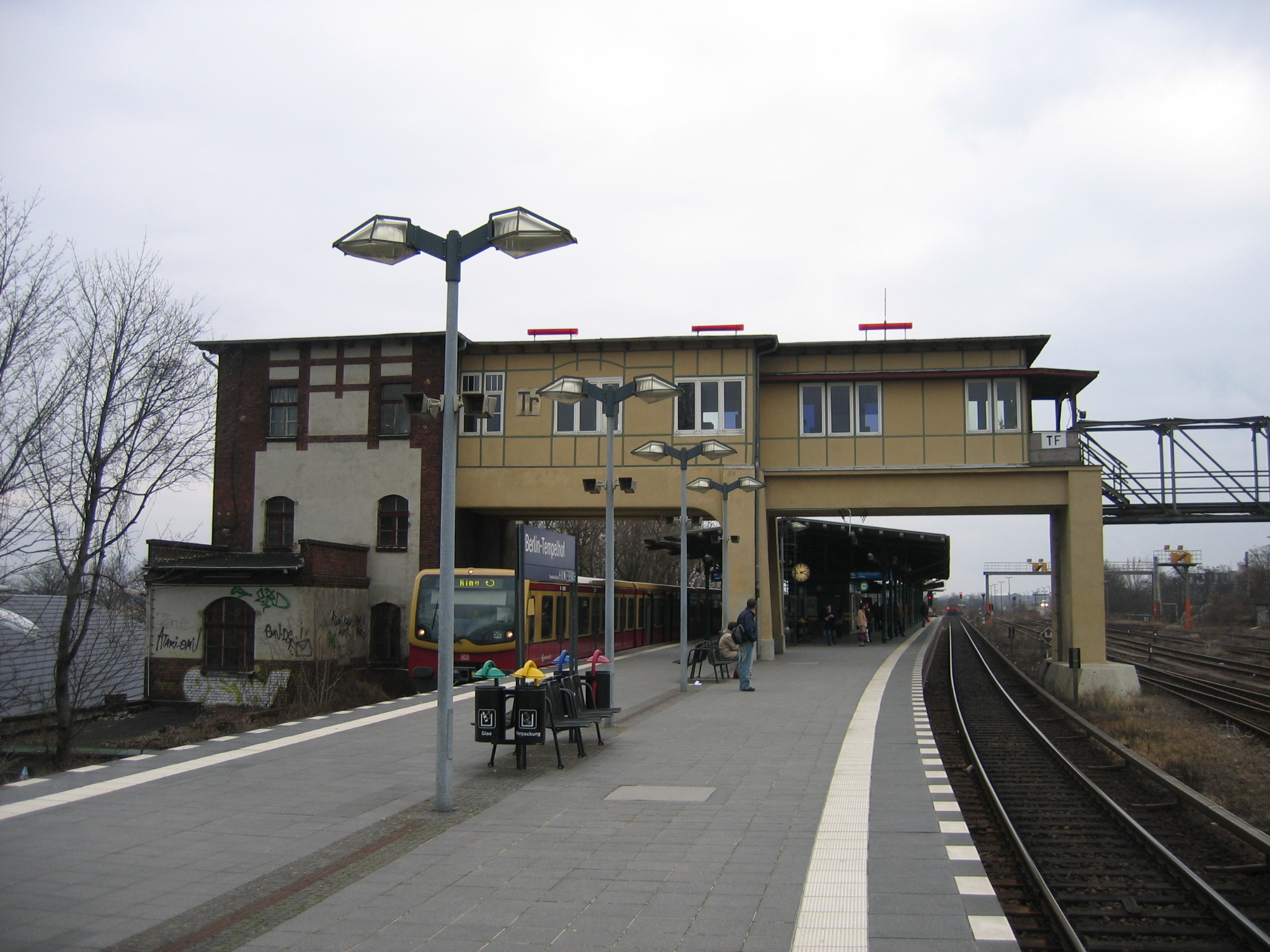
- S-Bahn station

General information
- Location: Tempelhof, Berlin, Berlin; Germany
- Line: Ringbahn

Construction
- Structure type: Embankment (S-Bahn); Underground (U-Bahn)

Other information
- Fare zone: VBB: Berlin A/5555

Services
Preceding station	Berlin S-Bahn	Following station
Hermannstraße One-way operation	S41	Südkreuz Ringbahn (clockwise)
Hermannstraße Ringbahn (counter-clockwise)	S42	Südkreuz One-way operation
Südkreuz Terminus	S45	Hermannstraße towards BER Airport
Südkreuz towards Westend	S46	Hermannstraße towards Königs Wusterhausen
Preceding station	Berlin U-Bahn	Following station
Paradestraße towards Alt-Tegel	U6	Alt-Tempelhof towards Alt-Mariendorf
Location

Tempelhof is a railway station in the district of Berlin with the same name. It is served by the S-Bahn lines S41, S42, S45 and S46 and the U-Bahn line U6. The S-Bahn station is on an embankment at the junction of Tempelhofer Damm and Bundesautobahn 100, about 1 km south of the entrance to the former Tempelhof Airport. The U-Bahn station, officially called Tempelhof (Südring) (South Ring), is under Tempelhofer Damm immediately south of the S-Bahn station.

== History ==
The S-Bahn station opened on 1 January 1872 as part of the opening of the Ringbahn. It was originally located somewhat further west, but was relocated in 1895 to Tempelhofer Damm (then called Berliner Straße) in order to provide better integration into the rail network for a base of the Train Battalion of the Prussian Guard which was then located there. A goods station remained to the west.

The Ringbahn was electrified in 1928; a power station was built between the Tempelhof and Papestraße (now Südkreuz) stations, accessible from both. In 1930, it was integrated into the Berlin S-Bahn. The extension of the U-Bahn line southwards to provide an interchange station at Tempelhof occurred during the same period: the U-Bahn station opened on 22 December 1929 under Tempelhofer Damm where the South Ring crossed it, and was thus called Tempelhof (Südring). It was designed by Alfred Grenander in an unusually spare style with open mezzanine galleries at both ends of the platform. The exit at the north end leads directly into the S-Bahn station building, which was an innovation at the time. Until 1966 it was the southern terminus of the C^{II} line, now the U6; the tunnel to Alt-Tempelhof was almost completely excavated when work was suspended in 1941 because of World War II.

On 7 May 1944, the ceiling broke through at this station. Three bomb blasts were accumulated on 21 June 1944. The tunnel wall was attacked on the Battle of Berlin. In July 1945 a fire broke out in the turnaround and train storage area at the Tempelhof station and caused so much damage that trains terminated at Mehringdamm until February 1946.

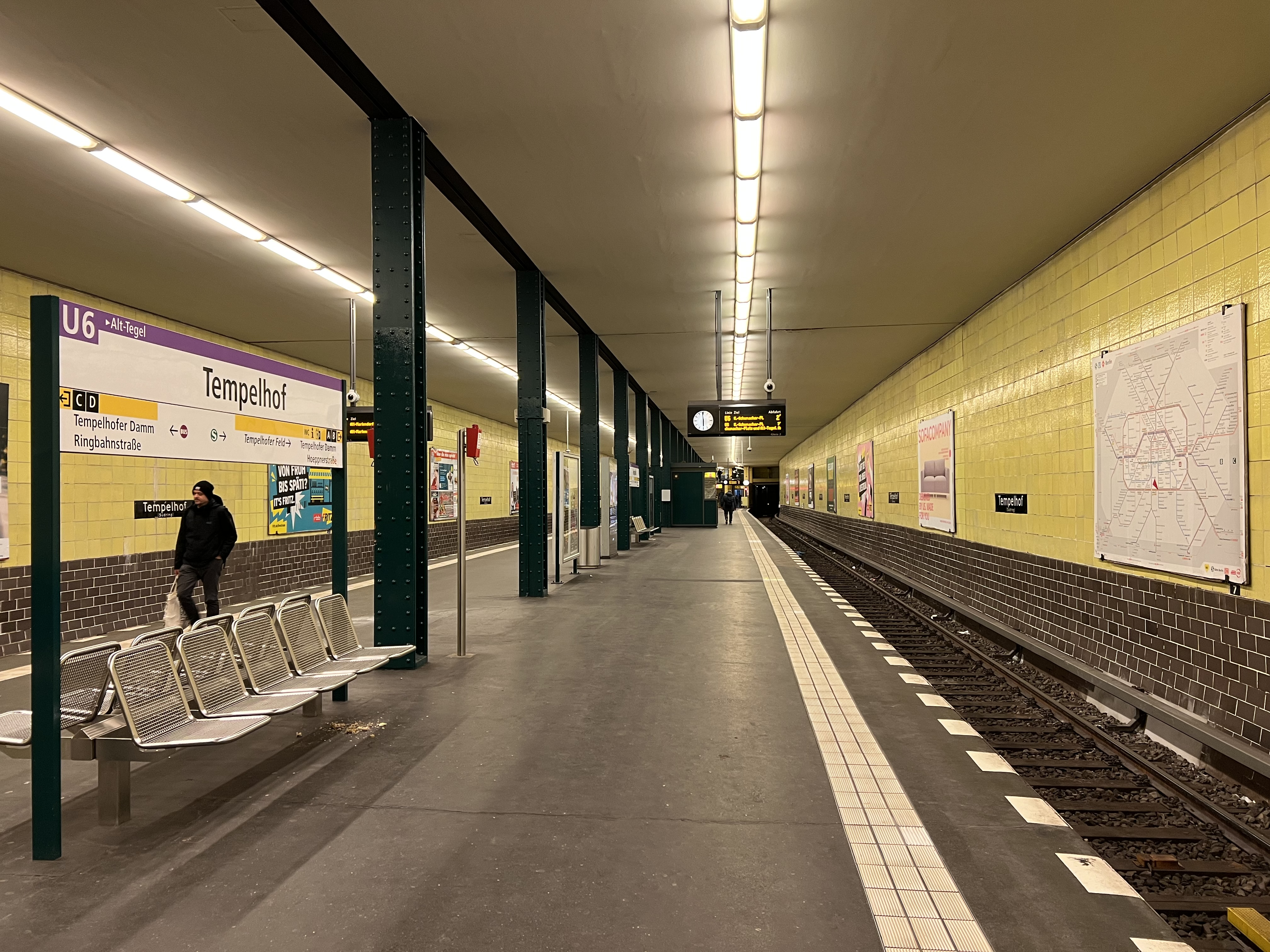
U-Bahn station

After the erection of the Berlin Wall in 1961, West Berliners boycotted the S-Bahn to put pressure on the GDR government, which controlled the parent Deutsche Reichsbahn. The boycott led to extremely reduced S-Bahn passenger numbers, and after a strike by West Berlin S-Bahn employees to the ending of service over large stretches of the system in the West. The West Berlin portion of the Ringbahn, including the Tempelhof station, was taken out of service in September 1980. The U-Bahn station, named simply Tempelhof since 1962, remained in service. It was renovated in 1985; the ceiling had sustained bad water damage and was plastered over. The brightly coloured rectangular patterns on the ceiling date to this time.

Service was only restored on the Ringbahn after German reunification, although the Berlin Senate had been working on plans to reopen it even before the Wall fell, since the S-Bahn had been transferred in January 1984 to the BVG (Berlin Transport). Südring was again appended to the name of the Tempelhof U-Bahn station on 31 May 1992, and the S-Bahn station reopened on 17 December 1993 when the segment of the South Ring between Baumschulenweg and Westend was placed back in service, and thus the station is once more a transfer point between the S-Bahn and the U-Bahn.
