= Berlin-Blankenburg station =

Railway station in Berlin, Germany

Berlin-Blankenburg
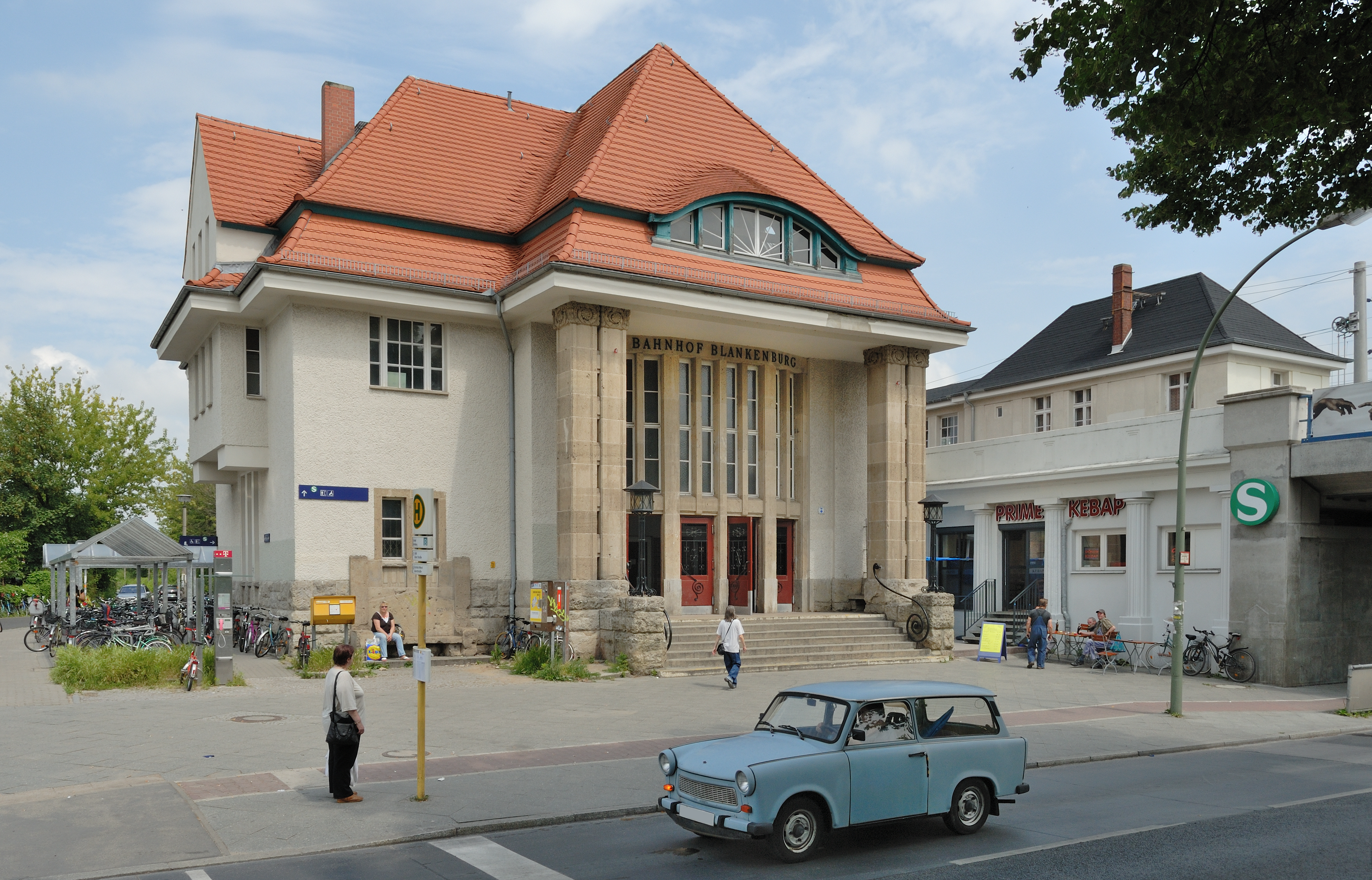

General information
- Location: Pankow, Berlin, Berlin; Germany
- Coordinates: 52°35′29″N 13°26′37″E
- Line: Stettin railway
- Platforms: 1 island platform
- Tracks: 2

Other information
- Station code: 535
- DS100 code: BBKB
- Category: 4
- Fare zone: : Berlin B/5656
- Website: www.bahnhof.de

History
- Opened: 1 June 1877; 149 years ago
- Electrified: 8 August 1924; 102 years ago

Services
Preceding station	Berlin S-Bahn	Following station
Karow towards Bernau	S2	Pankow-Heinersdorf towards Blankenfelde
Mühlenbeck-Mönchmühle towards Birkenwerder	S8	Pankow-Heinersdorf towards Wildau
Terminus	S26	Pankow-Heinersdorf towards Teltow Stadt
Location

Blankenburg is a railway station in the Pankow district of Berlin. It is served by the S-Bahn lines S2, S8, and S26.
