= S26 (Berlin) =

S-Bahn line in Berlin, Germany

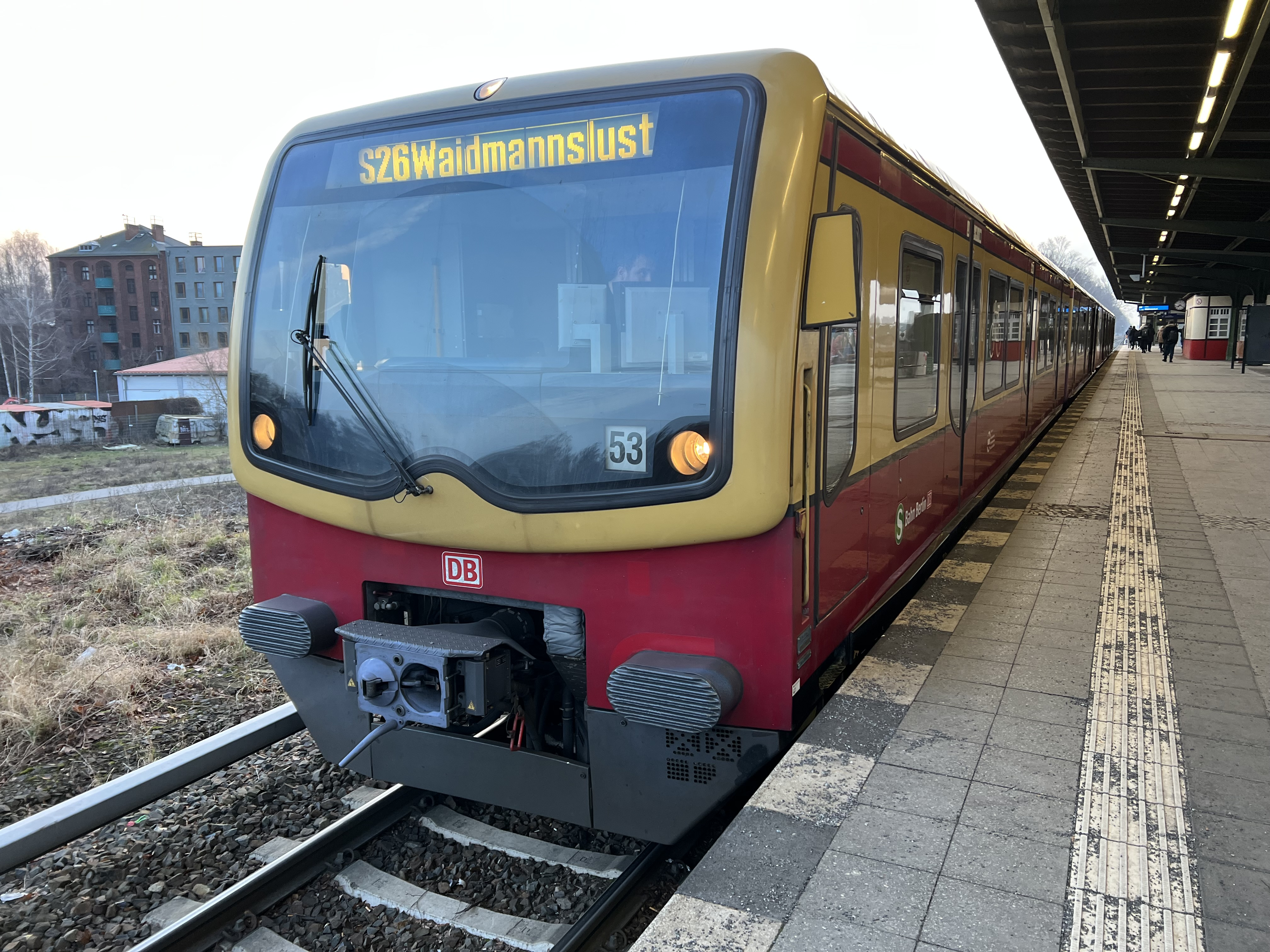
- A Waidmannslust-bound S26 service at Berlin-Wilhelmsruh in 2023

Overview
- Locale: Berlin
- First service: 10 December 2017
- Current operator(s): S-Bahn Berlin GmbH

Route
- Termini: Teltow Stadt; Berlin-Blankenburg

Technical
- Rolling stock: DBAG Class 481

The S26 is a service of the Berlin S-Bahn. It runs from Teltow in the district (Kreis) of Potsdam-Mittelmark via Südkreuz, through the Berlin Nord-Süd Tunnel with a stop at Friedrichstraße, and ends in Blankenburg in the borough of Pankow. On weekends the S26 runs from Teltow to Potsdamer Platz. The current service began operation in December 2017.

Trains on this line run every 20 minutes. This interval is in sections shortened to a 10-minute interval by the S25. There is no night service on this line.

== History ==
=== Previous services ===
The S26 designation was previously used for several short-lived services:

- May – October 1995: between Lichterfelde Süd and Waidmannslust
- September 2001 – June 2003: between Lichterfelde Süd and Birkenwerder
- February 2005 – May 2006: between Teltow Stadt and Potsdamer Platz

=== Current service ===
The current S26 began operation on 10 December 2017 between Teltow Stadt and Waidmannslust; it replaced the S85 north of Bornholmer Straße. The northern terminus shifted from Waidmannslust to Berlin-Blankenburg on 10 December 2023.
