= S2 (Berlin) =

Railway line in Berlin, Germany

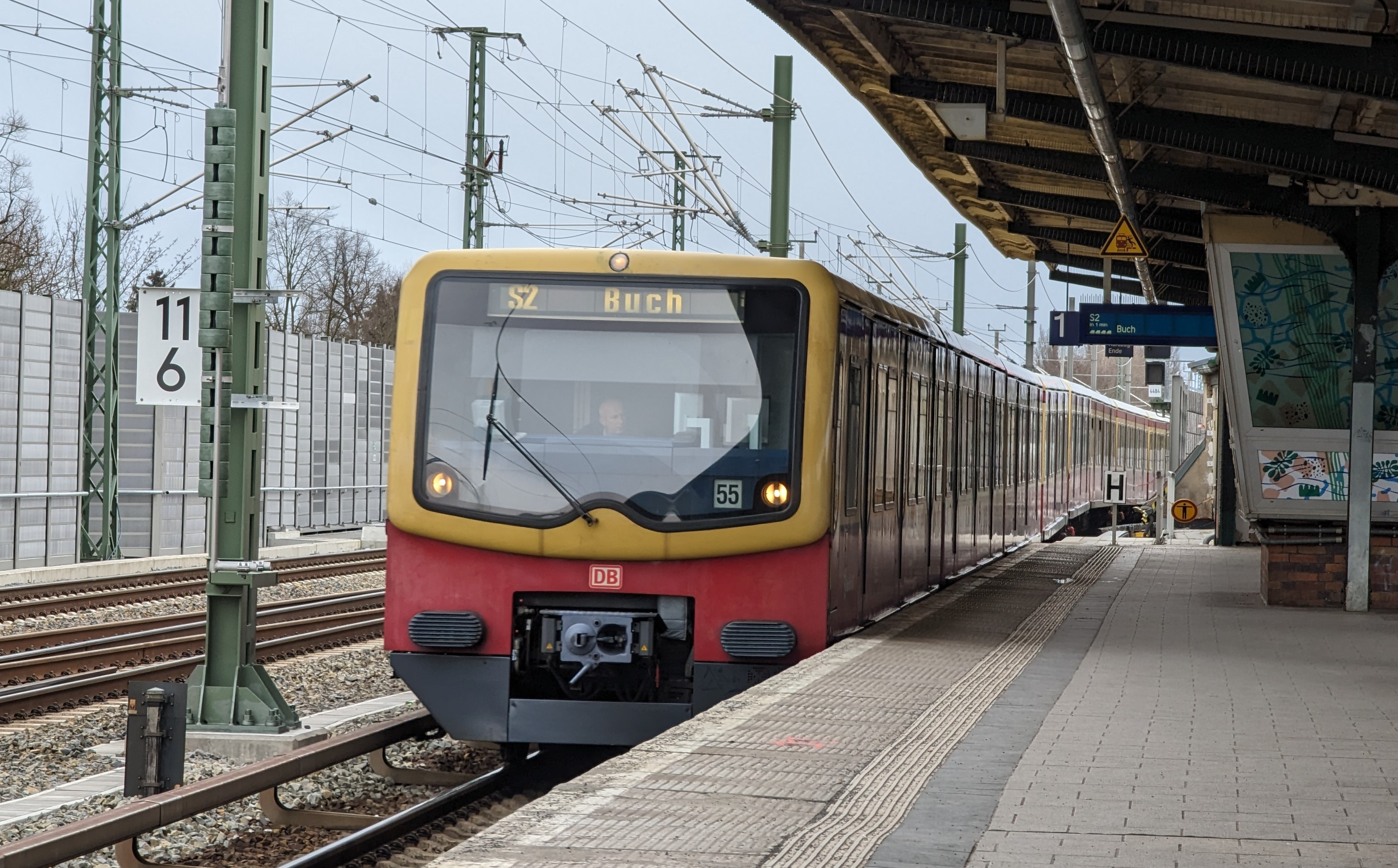
- An S2 arrives at Karow in 2023

Overview
- Locale: Berlin
- First service: 9 January 1984
- Current operator: S-Bahn Berlin GmbH

Route
- Termini: Bernau; Blankenfelde
- Lines used: Berlin–Szczecin railway; Berlin Nord-Süd Tunnel; Berlin–Dresden railway

Technical
- Rolling stock: DBAG Class 481

S2 is a line on the Berlin S-Bahn. It operates from Bernau to Blankenfelde over:

- the Berlin-Szczecin railway, opened on 1 August 1842 and electrified on 8 August 1924,
- the Nord-Süd-Tunnel, opened on 28 May 1936 from Humboldthain to Unter den Linden and on 6 November 1939 to Anhalter Bahnhof and Priesterweg
- the Berlin–Dresden railway, opened on 17 June 1875 and electrified on 15 May 1933.

Since becoming a numbered route in 1984, the S2's line colour is green.

== Service history ==
The S2 was created along with the S1 and S3 on 9 January 1984, when the Berliner Verkehrsbetriebe (BVG) took over the S-Bahn network from the East German Deutsche Reichsbahn in West Berlin: the S2 initially ran between Lichtenrade and Anhalter Bahnhof, before being extended northwards to Gesundbrunnen on 1 May 1984, and Frohnau on 1 October 1984.

In 1990, the S1 replaced the S2 between Gesundbrunnen and Frohnau.
