= Berlin-Lichterfelde Ost station =

Railway station in Berlin

Berlin Lichterfelde Ost
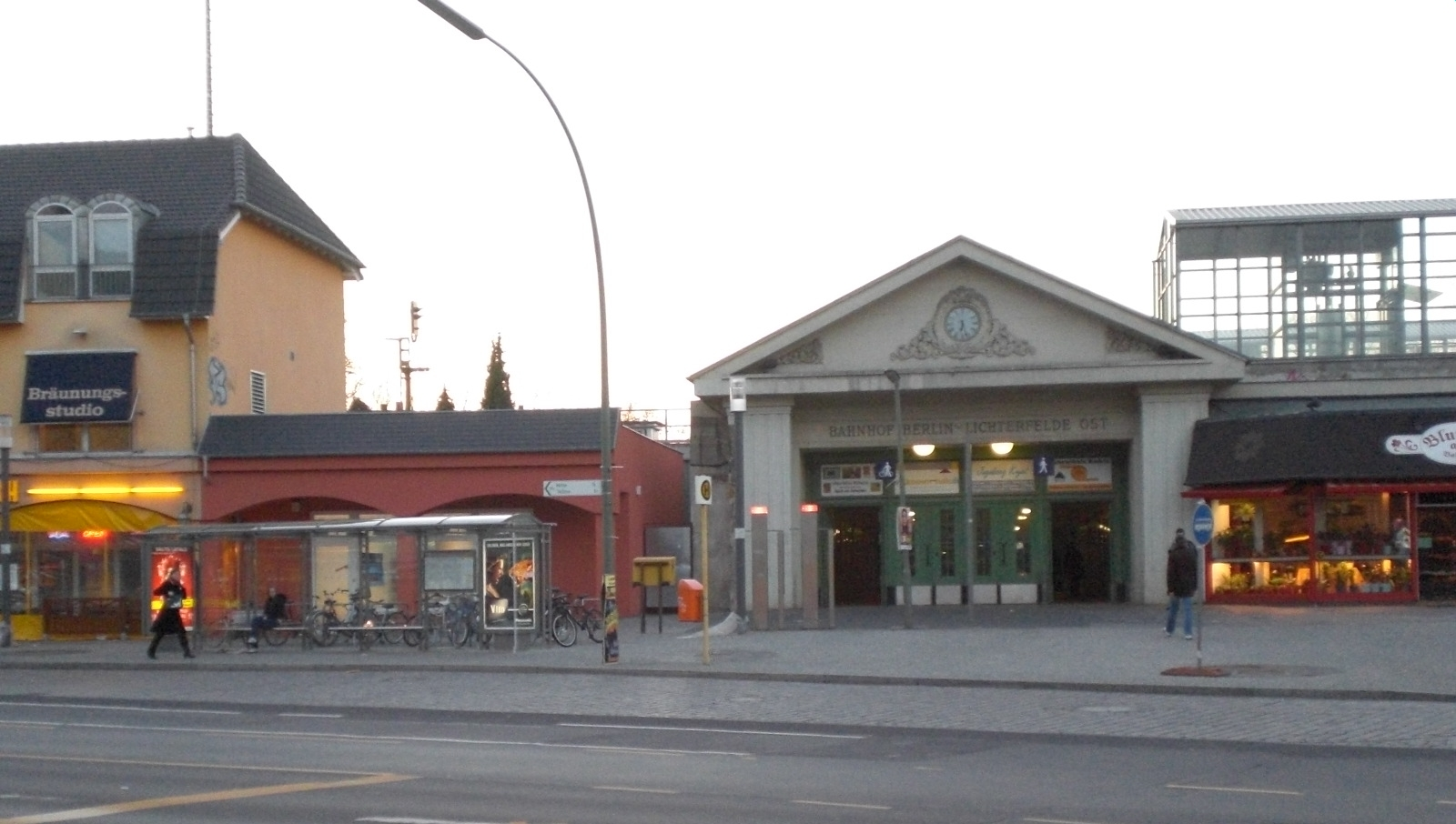
- South-eastern entrance

General information
- Location: Lankwitzer Str.26, Lichterfelde, Berlin; Germany
- Coordinates: 52°25′48″N 13°19′44″E
- Lines: Berlin–Halle (KBS 203, 204, 205, 209.32); Anhalt Suburban Line (KBS 200.25)
- Platforms: 2 (long-distance); 2 (S-Bahn)

Construction
- Accessible: Yes
- Architect: Karl Cornelius, Alfred Lücking

Other information
- Station code: 7720
- DS100 code: BLIH long distance; BLIO S-Bahn
- IBNR: 8011041
- Category: 3
- Fare zone: : Berlin B/5656
- Website: sbahn.berlin; www.bahnhof.de

History
- Opened: 20 September 1868; 28 May 1995
- Closed: 9 January 1984
- Former names: Lichterfelde (1868–1884); Groß-Lichterfelde (1884–1886); Groß-Lichterfelde BM (1886–1899); Groß-Lichterfelde Ost (1899–1925); Lichterfelde Ost (1925–1936)

Services
| Preceding station | DB Regio Nordost | Following station |
|---|---|---|
| Berlin Südkreuz towards Stralsund Hbf or Schwedt | RE 3 | Ludwigsfelde towards Jüterbog or Lutherstadt Wittenberg Hbf |
| Berlin Südkreuz towards Rathenow or Stendal Hbf | RE 4 | Ludwigsfelde towards Jüterbog or Falkenberg (Elster) |
| Preceding station | Ostdeutsche Eisenbahn | Following station |
| Berlin Südkreuz towards Wismar | RE 8 | Blankenfelde towards Elsterwerda |
| Preceding station | Berlin S-Bahn | Following station |
| Lankwitz towards Hennigsdorf | S25 | Osdorfer Straße towards Teltow Stadt |
| Lankwitz towards Blankenburg | S26 | Osdorfer Straße towards Teltow Stadt |
Location
- Location within Berlin

Berlin-Lichterfelde Ost station is on the Anhalt Suburban Line in Lichterfelde in the Berlin borough of Steglitz-Zehlendorf. It is served by S-Bahn line S25, S-Bahn line S26, and Regional-Express lines 3, 4 and 5.

== History ==
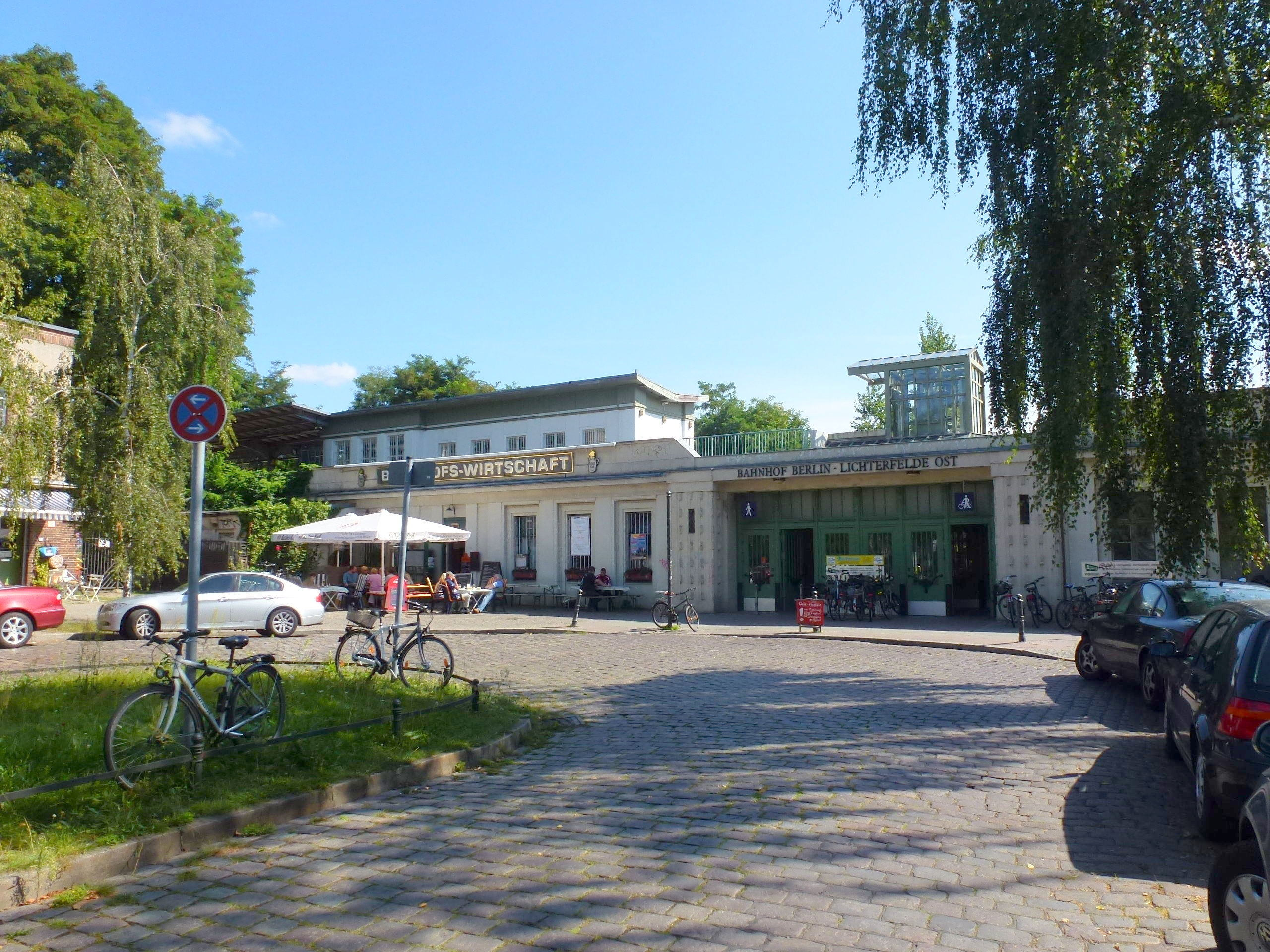
North-western entrance

The station was originally called Lichterfelde and opened on 20 September 1868 on the Berlin–Halle railway (Anhalt Railway). It served long-distance trains and was financed by entrepreneur and developer J. A. W. von Carstenn. The tracks of the Anhalt Railway were then still at ground level and the station had only one platform. Suburban trains also stopped there from 1876. In 1881, Siemens & Halske built the first electric tramway in the world, the Lichterfelde–Kadettenanstalt tramway, from the station to the Königlich Preußische Hauptkadettenanstalt (Royal Prussian Military Academy), now the site of the Berlin branch of the German Federal Archives. On 15 July 1884, the station was renamed Groß-Lichterfelde (“Greater Lichterfelde”) after Lichterfelde, Giesensdorf and their estates had been combined into a municipality with this name. Because of its location on the Anhalt Railway from Berlin to Halle (Saale), it was renamed just two years later as Groß-Lichterfelde BH to avoid confusion with the Groß-Lichterfelde BM station on the Berlin–Magdeburg railway, now called Berlin-Lichterfelde West station and operated as part of the Wannsee Railway.

Finally, on 1 January 1899, the name changed again to Groß-Lichterfelde Ost and a second platform, which served the long-distance traffic only, was opened at the same time. Separate suburb tracks were opened to the Potsdamer Ring- und Vorortbahnhof (Ring line and suburban station) in 1901.

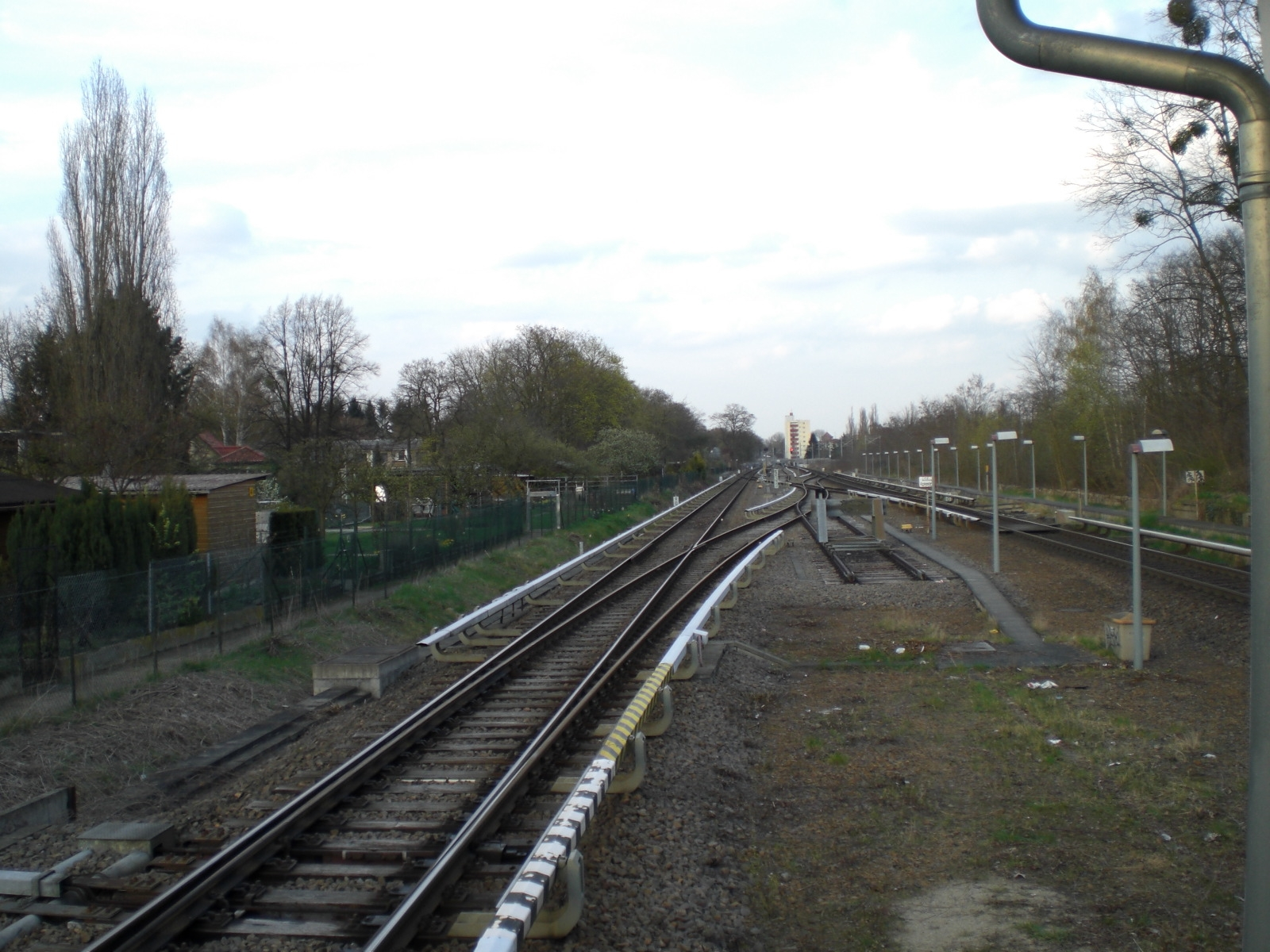
Turn-back facility to the north of the S-Bahn platforms

Between 1913 and 1916, the station was raised above ground level and expanded to three platforms with six platform tracks. In addition, there were five freight tracks. An entrance building with articulated pilasters and a decorated entrance with a gable containing a clock was built on its northwest side to the plans of Karl Cornelius in collaboration with Alfred Lücking. It was rebuilt after the Second World War to a simplified design without steep roofs. It connects with a pedestrian tunnel, which is illuminated with skylights. On its south side it has a stately neoclassical portal, which is topped by a tympanum and flanked by two fluted pilasters. On the platforms, there were wooden, inward sloping roofs on steel substructures, which are now only retained on the S-Bahn platform. West of the station a road underpass was built between Königsberger Straße and Oberhofer Weg, along with a compact, four storey-high signal box built of reinforced concrete covered with clinker bricks. The station with its pedestrian underpass and the signal box are heritage-listed as national monuments.

After the incorporation of Groß-Lichterfelde into Berlin under the Greater Berlin Act of 1920, the station was renamed Lichterfelde Ost in 1925. It has been called Berlin-Lichterfelde Ost since 1936.

As early as 1903, Groß-Lichterfelde Ost was served by electric suburban trains. The line was incorporated into the S-Bahn in 1929, after its electrification equipment and voltage was adapted to the S-Bahn's system.

With the closing of the Anhalter Bahnhof in 1952, the long-distance platforms at Lichterfelde Ost were closed and the station was served only by the S-Bahn, which was operated by Deutsche Reichsbahn. Even after the strike by the Reichsbahn's West Berlin employees in 1980, the line to Lichterfelde Süd continued to be operated, but it was closed in 1984 after the takeover by the Berliner Verkehrsbetriebe (BVG, Berlin Transportation Company). In the late 1980s, BVG was planning an extension of U-Bahn line U9 via Lankwitz to Lichterfelde Süd. The route would have run above ground on the former S-Bahn line. It has not been built and it is now no longer planned.

After the reunification of Germany, the S-Bahn line was rebuilt and the station was reopened with an island platform on 28 May 1995. The long-distance tracks were reopened together with the North–South mainline at the timetable change on 28 May 2006.

== Infrastructure ==
The station has three platforms: one island platform for the S-Bahn in the northwest and two uncovered side platforms for regional traffic on the southeast side. There is a turn-back facility for the S-Bahn, which is used for parking trains.

The former signal box is used as a cafe called the Stellwerk (“signal box”).

In the autumn of 2007, the station forecourt on the Lankwitzer Straße was reconstructed so that a new shopping centre could be built on old storage sidings. The shopping centre's name, LIO, refers to the S-Bahn station's code name.

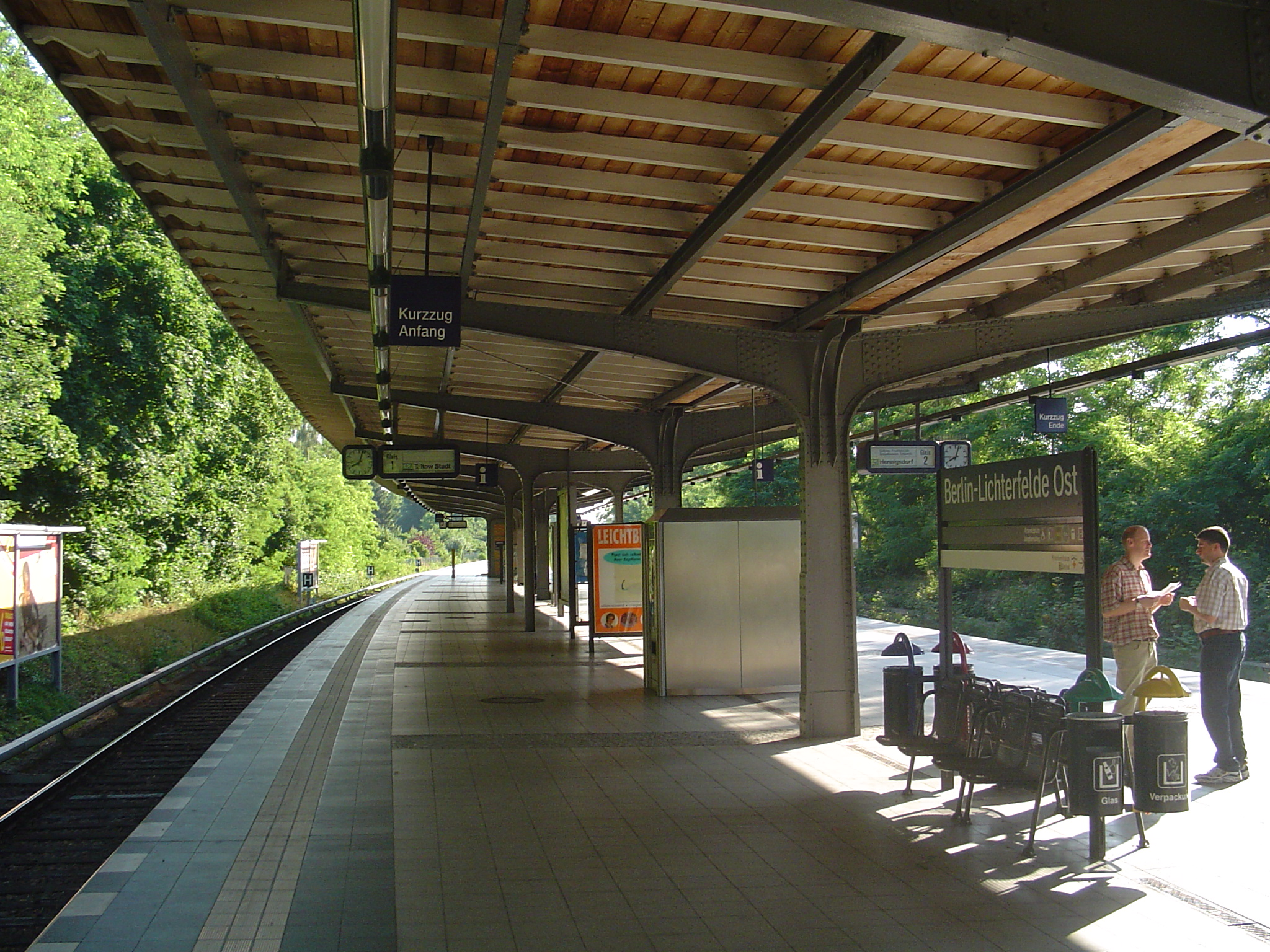
S-Bahn platform (to the west)

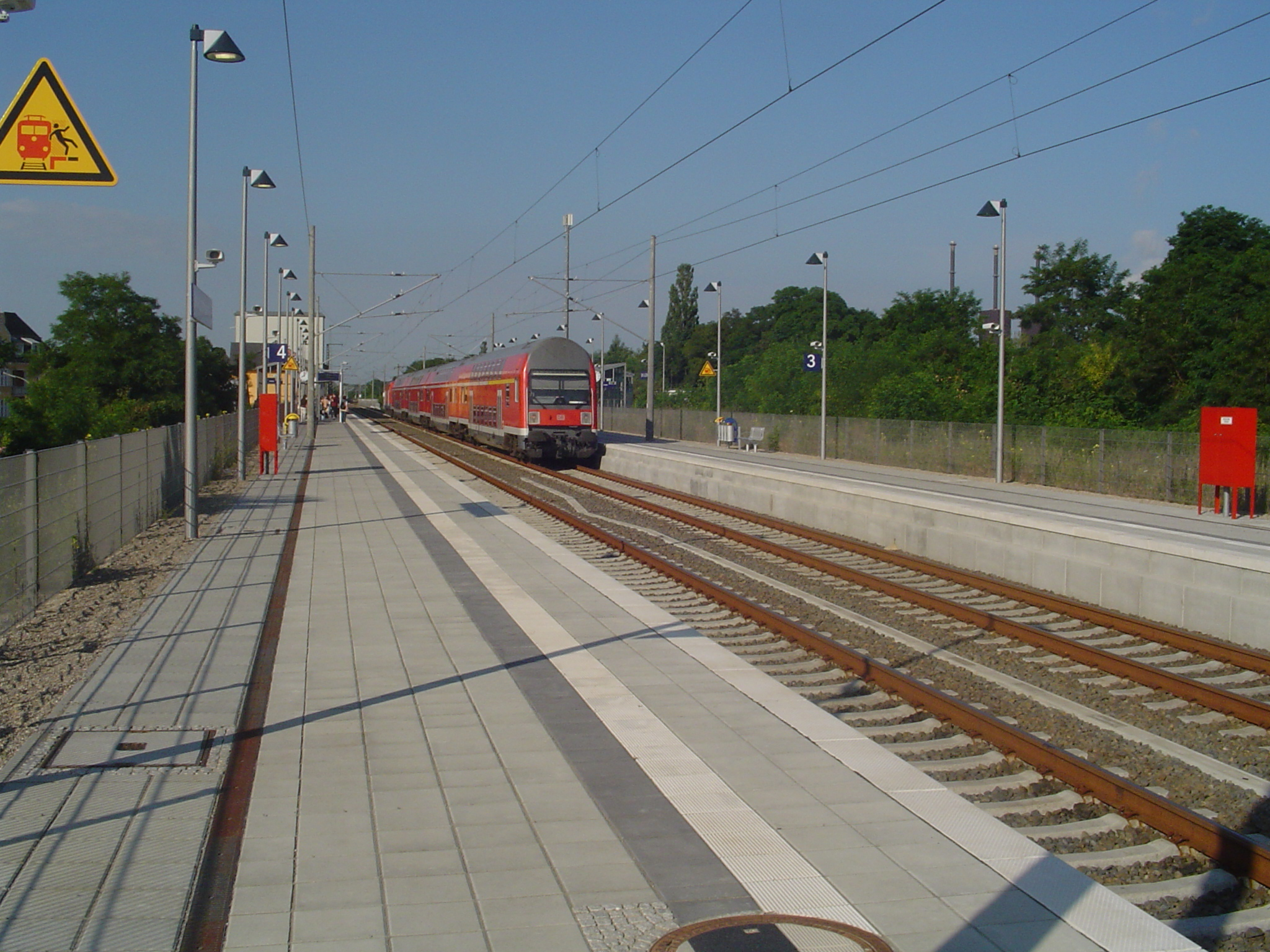
Regional platform (to the east)

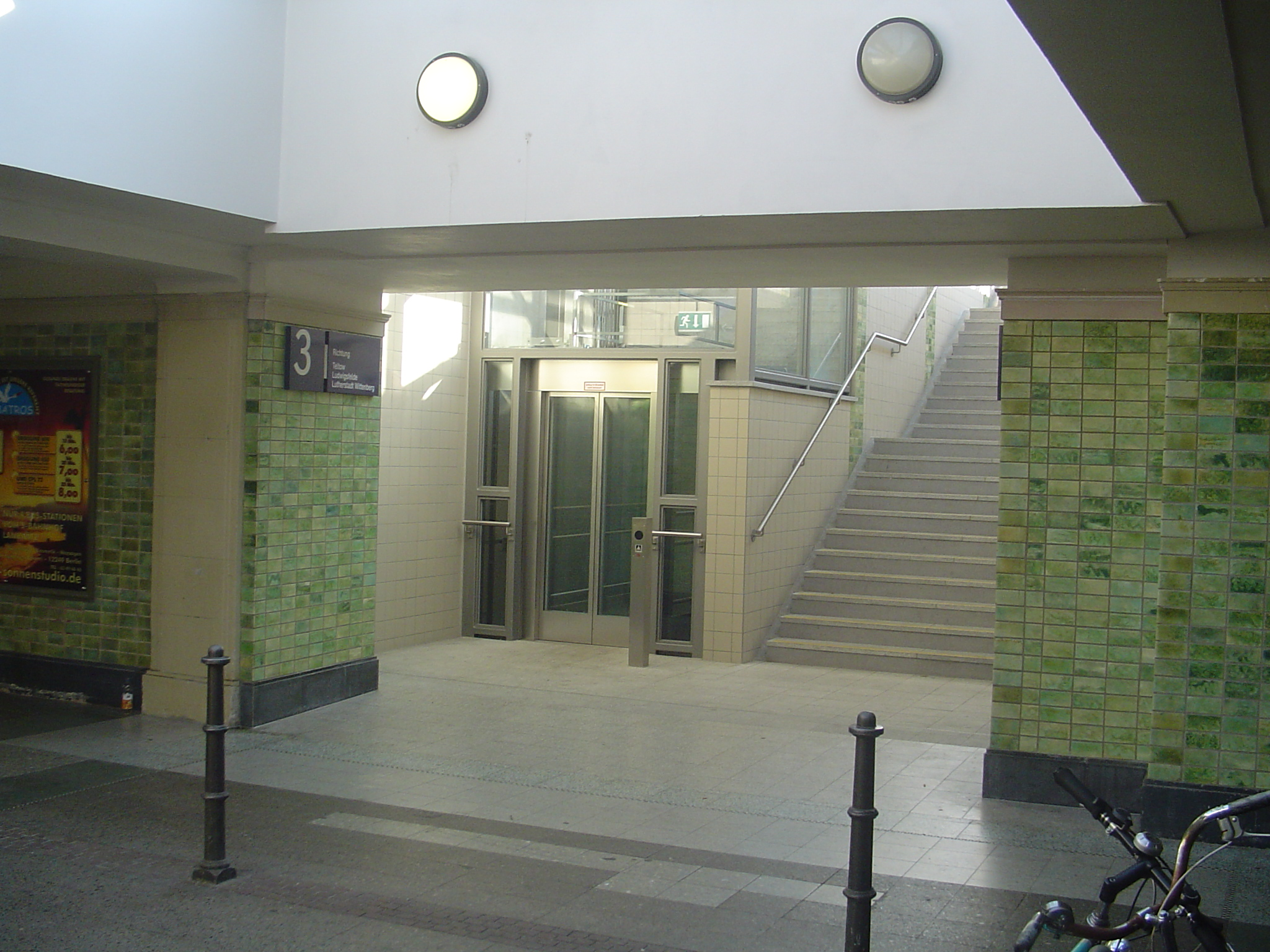
Entrance to the regional platform

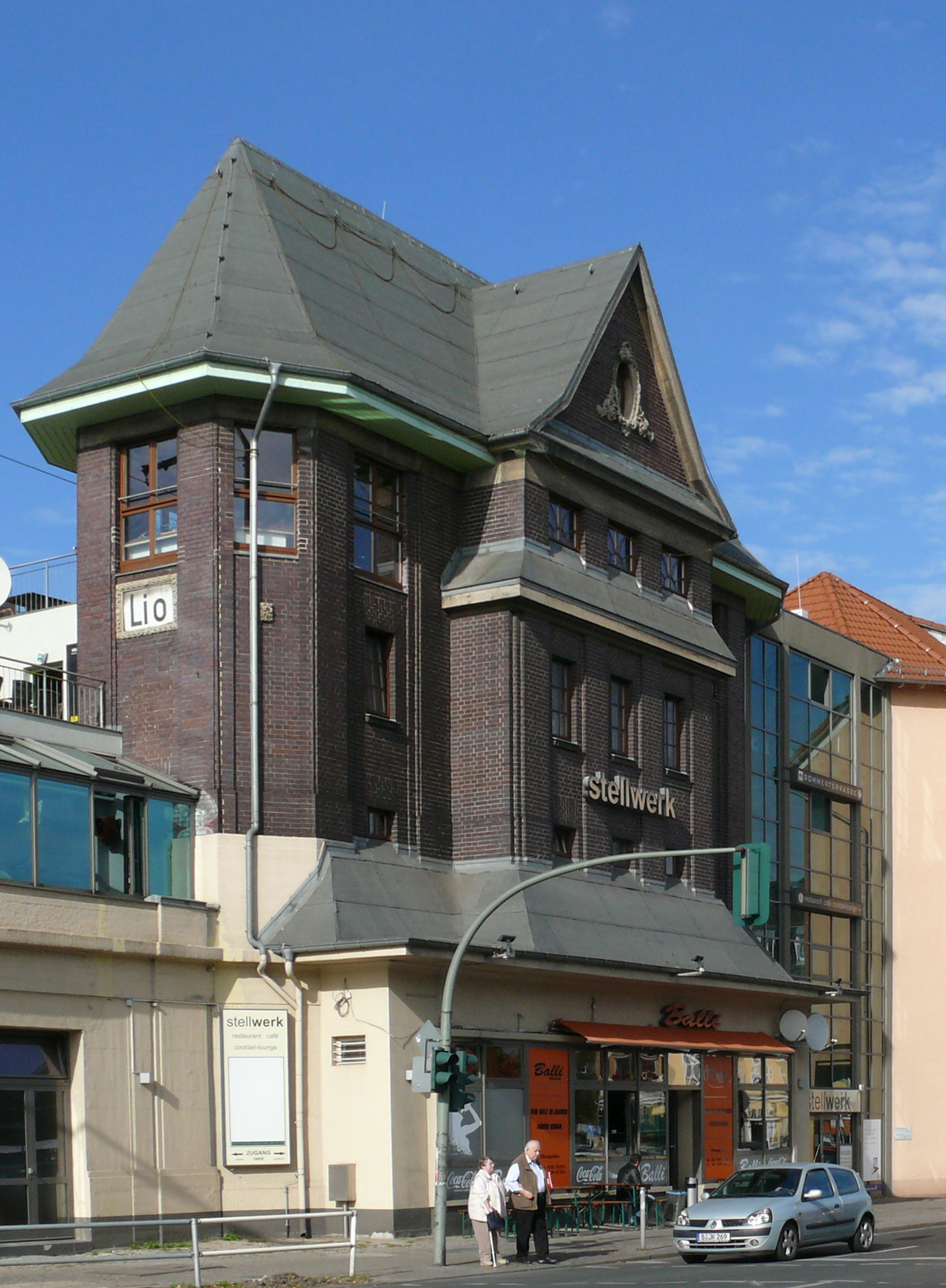
Signal box (now a café)

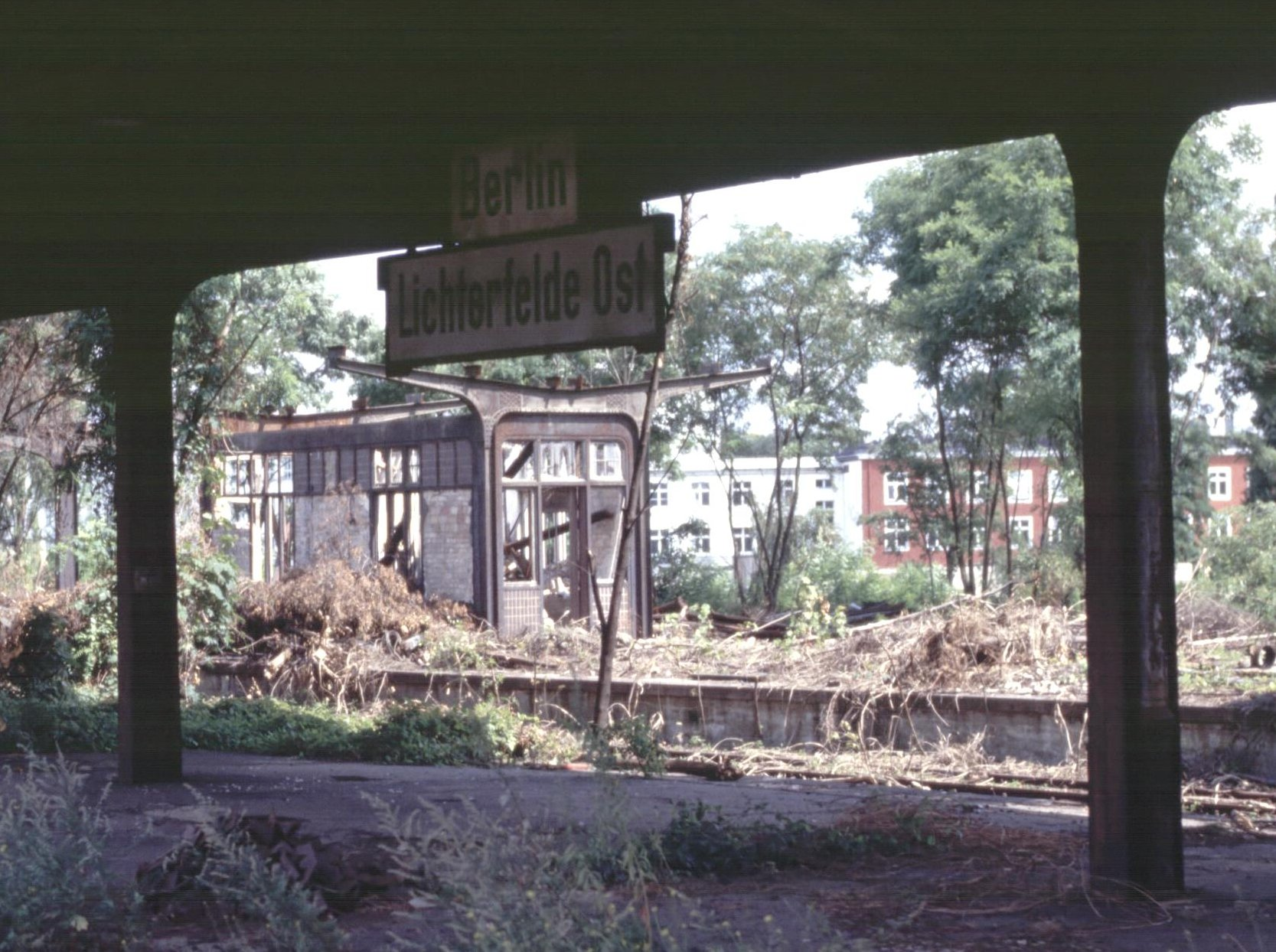
The former long-distance platforms in 1979

== Train services ==
The station was served by the following services in 2026:

| Line | Route |
|---|---|
| RE 3 | Lutherstadt Wittenberg – Zahna – Jüterbog – Berlin-Lichterfelde Ost – Berlin Hauptbahnhof – Eberswalde – Angermünde – Schwedt (Oder) / Prenzlau – Greifswald – Stralsund |
| RE 4 | (Falkenberg (Elster) –) Jüterbog – Ludwigsfelde – Berlin-Lichterfelde Ost – Berlin Hauptbahnhof – Dallgow-Döberitz – Wustermark – Rathenow (– Stendal) |
| RE 8 | Wismar – Schwerin – Ludwigslust – Berlin-Spandau – Berlin Hauptbahnhof – Berlin Potsdamer Platz – Berlin Südkreuz – Berlin-Lichterfelde Ost – Wünsdorf-Waldstadt – Luckau-Uckro – Doberlug-Kirchhain – Elsterwerda |
As of 14 December 2025

- Berlin S-Bahn services Hennigsdorf - Tegel - Gesundbrunnen - Friedrichstraße - Potsdamer Platz - Sudkreuz - Lichterfelde - Teltow
- Berlin S-Bahn services Waidmannslust - Wittenau - Gesundbrunnen - Friedrichstraße - Potsdamer Platz - Sudkreuz - Lichterfelde - Teltow

== Bus services ==
Several bus routes stop on Kranoldplatz in front of the station:

- 184 (Südkreuz – Teltow/ Warthestraße)
- 284 (Rathaus Steglitz– Lichterfelde Süd)
- X11 (Expressbus; Schöneweide – Krumme Lanke)
- M11 (Metrobus; Schöneweide – Dahlem-Dorf)
- N84 (night bus; Zehlendorf Eiche – Tempelhof)

== See also ==
- List of railway stations in Berlin
