= Osdorfer Straße station =

Railway station in Berlin

Osdorfer Straße
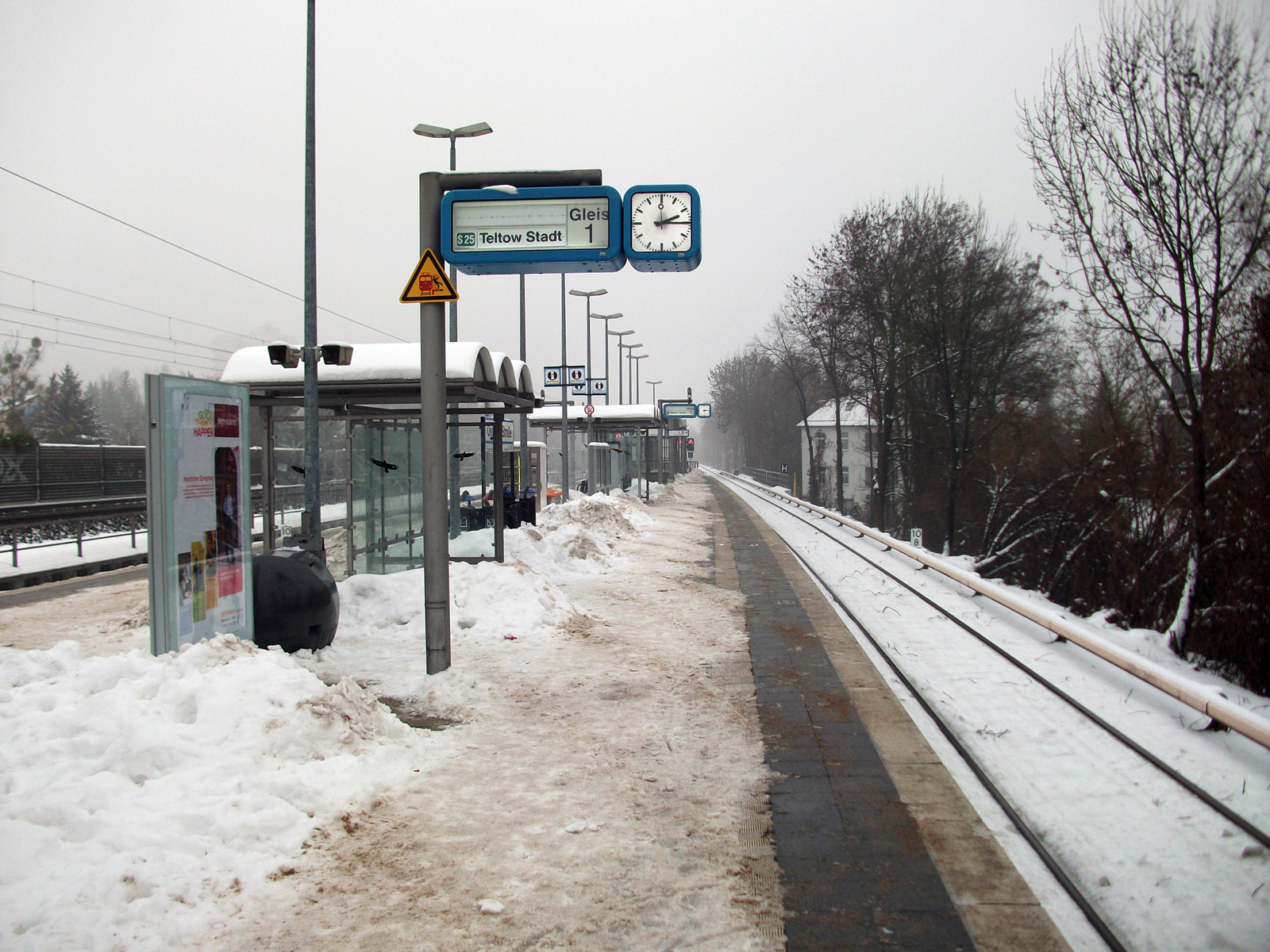
- Osdorfer Straße station in December 2010

General information
- Location: Osdorfer Str.124, Lichterfelde, Berlin; Germany
- Coordinates: 52°25′09″N 13°18′52″E
- Line: Anhalt Suburban Line
- Platforms: 2

Construction
- Accessible: Yes

Other information
- Station code: 7762
- DS100 code: BOSS
- IBNR: 8089473
- Category: 5
- Fare zone: VBB: Berlin B/5656
- Website: www.bahnhof.de

History
- Opened: 25 September 1998; 27 years ago
- Electrified: at opening

Services
Preceding station	Berlin S-Bahn	Following station
Lichterfelde Ost towards Hennigsdorf	S25	Lichterfelde Süd towards Teltow Stadt
Lichterfelde Ost towards Blankenburg	S26	Lichterfelde Süd towards Teltow Stadt
Location
- Location within Berlin

Berlin Osdorfer Straße station is a Berlin S-Bahn station on the Anhalt Suburban Line in Lichterfelde in the Berlin borough of Steglitz-Zehlendorf, which is served by S-Bahn line S25 and S-Bahn line S26. It was put into operation in 1998 and is thus one of the newest Berlin S-Bahn stations.

== Location ==
The station is located on the Anhalt line in Licherfelde in the borough of Steglitz-Zehlendorf, about 13 km south-west of the centre of Berlin. It borders on Osdorfer Straße and Hildburghauser Straße (streets). Berlin-Lichterfelde Süd station is about 1.1 km to the south and Lichterfelde Ost station is about 1.6 km to the northeast. Osdorfer Straße station is located in the Berlin fare zone B of the Verkehrsverbund Berlin-Brandenburg.

== Naming ==
The station is named after the areas immediately adjacent to the station on Osdorfer Straße (road to Osdorf). Osdorf was formerly a municipality in the district of Teltow-Fläming south of Berlin.

== History ==
A station at the location of the current Osdorfer Straße station was already planned in the 1970s to serve the Thermometersiedlung high-rise housing estate more effectively. After the widening of Osdorfer Straße, Deutsche Reichsbahn was commissioned to widen the railway bridges and build the new tracks for the proposed station. The cost was to be met by the Senate of Berlin. However, the new work was not completed until 1998. The Lichterfelde Ost–Lichterfelde Süd S-Bahn line was reopened with the opening of the station.

== Infrastructure ==
The station has a flat island platform, which is not covered, and an exit at the northern end and two at the southern end. The station is thus accessible from both sides of Osdorfer Straße. A 31 m-long (102 ft) corridor leads from a glazed southern staircase to the platforms.

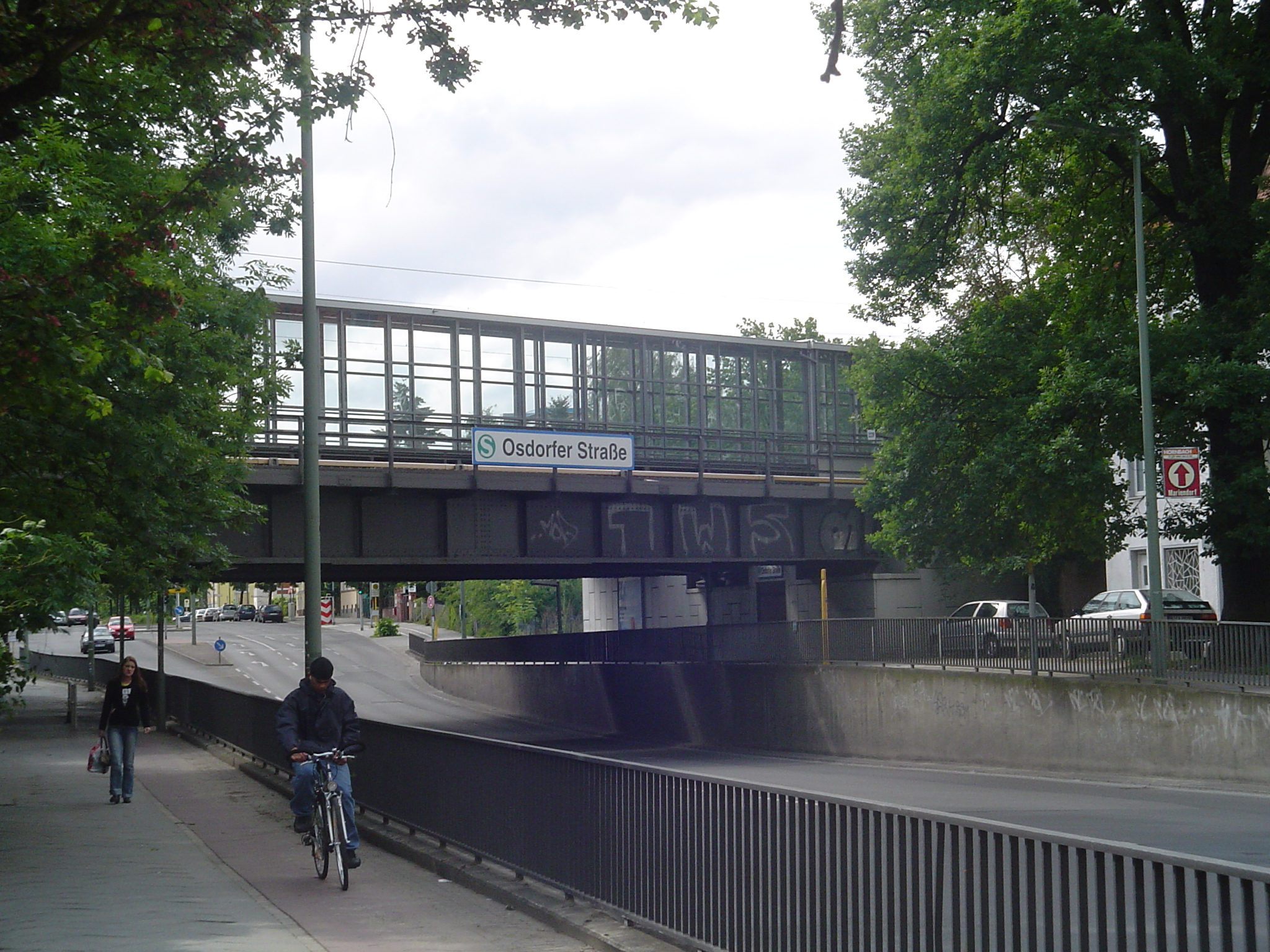
The station building in June 2006

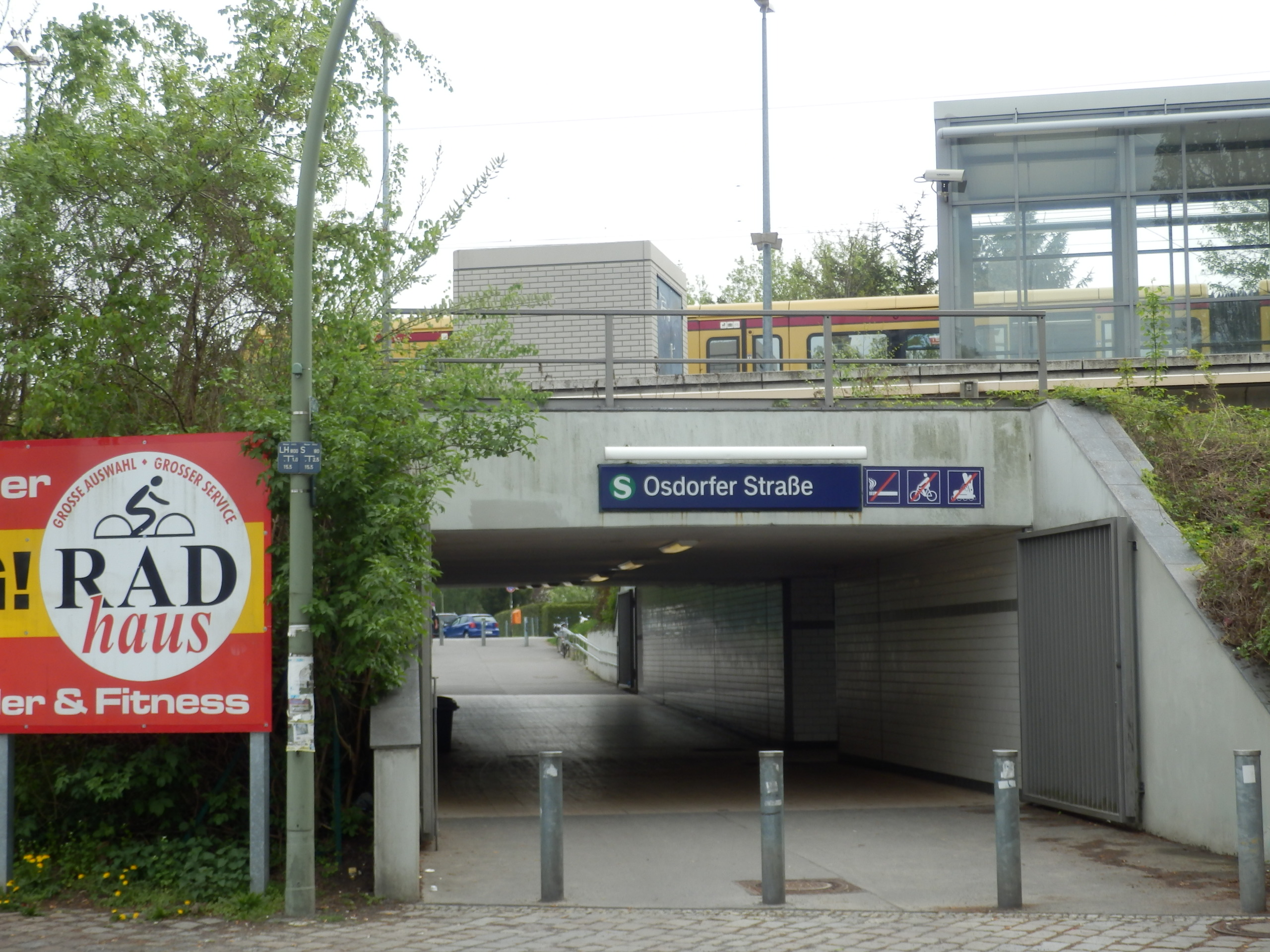
The station entrance in May 2013

== Connections ==
The station is served by line S25 and S-Bahn line S26 of the Berlin S-Bahn. It is also by some bus routes.

== See also ==
- List of railway stations in Berlin
