= Anhalt Suburban Line =

Railway line in Germany

Anhalt suburban line

Overview
- Native name: Anhalter Vorortbahn
- Line number: 6036
- Locale: Berlin, Brandenburg, Germany
- Termini: Berlin; Lichterfelde Süd

Service
- Route number: 200.25

Technical
- Line length: 14.9 km (9.3 mi)
- Track gauge: 1,435 mm (4 ft 8 1/2 in) standard gauge
- Electrification: 750 V third rail

The Anhalt suburban line (German: Anhalter Vorortbahn) is a suburban railway in Berlin and Brandenburg. It originally ran from Potsdamer Ringbahnhof in Berlin over the Berlin–Halle railway (also called the Anhalter Bahn or Anhalt Railway). With the opening of the Berlin Nord-Süd Tunnel in 1939, this service was abandoned. Subsequently, the electric services ran to the south parallel with the long-distance tracks of the Anhalt Railway. Its terminus was at Berlin-Lichterfelde Ost until the 1940s. In 1943, it was extended to Lichterfelde Süd for electric trains and to Ludwigsfelde for steam trains. The construction of the Berlin Wall in 1961 stopped services at the outskirts of Berlin. In 2005, a new Berlin-Lichterfelde Süd–Teltow Stadt S-Bahn line was opened.

== History ==
The population of many towns and villages around Berlin grew significantly in the late 19th century. Lichterfelde (incorporated into Groß-Lichterfelde, meaning Greater Lichterfelde, from 1884) grew into a residential suburb from the 1870s. The number of commuter trains on the Anhalt Railway increased continually during the last decades of the 19th century. A convenient system of suburban fares was applied from 1891 on many lines into Berlin, among them on the Anhalt Railway to Groß Lichterfelde B. H. station (the acronym stood for Berlin and Halle; the station was called Groß Lichterfelde Ost from 1899). In 1893, a new Groß-Lichterfelde-Süd station was opened, which was not, however, included in the suburban fare zone until 1943. Lankwitz-Victoriastraße (now: Berlin-Lankwitz) station was opened in 1895.

Because of the increasing volume of trains, it was decided to build a separate suburban railways and to raise the line to Lankwitz above street level. The original plans envisaged that the suburban tracks would initially run to the east of the long-distance tracks. It was, however, finally decided to move it to the west of the long-distance tracks. One reason for this was to facilitate the planned extensions to the Berlin Anhalter Bahnhof (Anhalt station). That is why the suburban route did not start at this station but instead at the more westerly Potsdamer Ring- und Vorortbahnhof (Ring line and suburban station) of the Potsdamer station. On 1 December 1901, the operation of the Anhalt suburban line was commenced to Groß Lichterfelde Ost. The new suburban station of Papestraße was opened with the line; it has been called Südkreuz since 2006. 74 pairs of suburban trains a day now operated, more than double the number of the previous year.

Yorkstraße (now Yorckstraße) station opened on 1 May 1903.

=== Electrical operations ===
In 1903 electric operations was trialed for suburban trains between the Potsdamer Ring station and Lichterfelde Ost using a 550 volts DC system. After that the trains ran most of the day at 10-minute intervals. In 1929 the line was converted to the system adopted for the Berlin S-Bahn in 1924.

Groß-Lichterfelde-Ost station was placed on an embankment and upgraded in 1915. After the power supply of the line was greatly improved between 1936 and 1938, electrical operations commenced on the Dresden railway to Mahlow on 15 May 1939. This ended the previous mixed operation of steam and electric trains between Potsdamer Ring station and Priesterweg. On 9 October 1939, the suburban line was connected to the new Nord-Süd Tunnel by a ramp from Yorckstraße station and the connection from there to Potsdamer Ring station was abandoned.

=== Extension to Ludwigsfelde ===
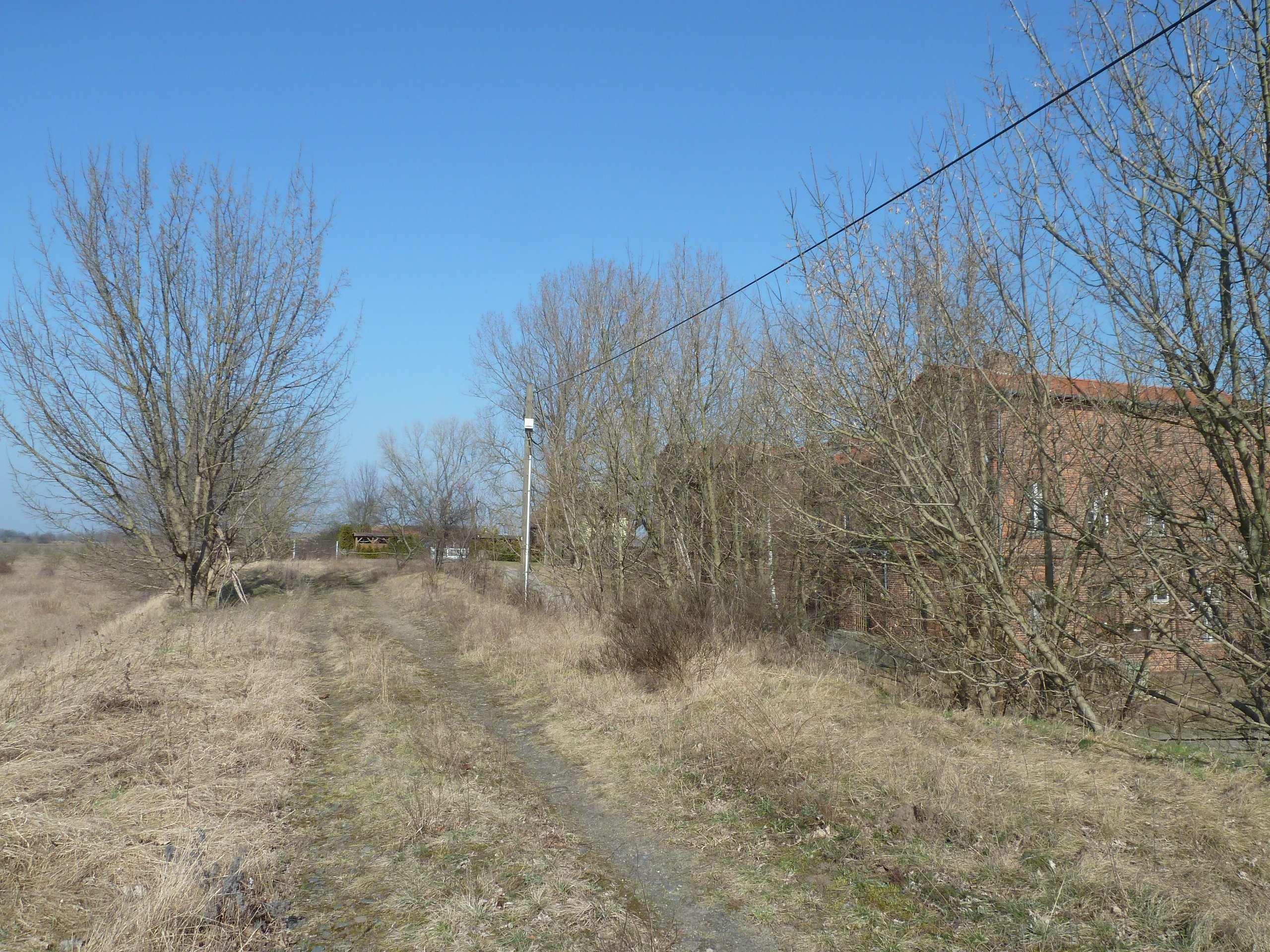
Embankment of the suburban railway to the west of the station building of Großbeeren station.

Plans of the 1930s envisaged a series of major rail projects especially in southern Berlin, but these could only be partially realised due to the war. This included the extension of the S-Bahn to Trebbin, where a new S-Bahn depot was to be built. Separate suburban tracks were actually built to Ludwigsfelde station, which went into operation on 9 August 1943. This line ran on an embankment as far as Genshagener Heide and after that at ground level. In Ludwigsfelde a separate terminal station was built for the suburban line. New stations were opened in Birkengrund Nord (north) and Birkengrund Süd (south). These were initially intended for traffic to the Daimler aircraft engine factory, but were opened to the public a short time later. In 1944, the suburban trains ran between Lichterfelde Süd and Ludwigsfelde every 10 to 20 minutes in the peak hour and every 30 or 60 minutes during the day. The long-distance tracks were built on an embankment past Teltow station.

Towards the end of the Second World War, there was severe damage to the Anhalt Railway and the bridges over the Teltow Canal were blown up by German troops.

=== Development after the Second World War ===
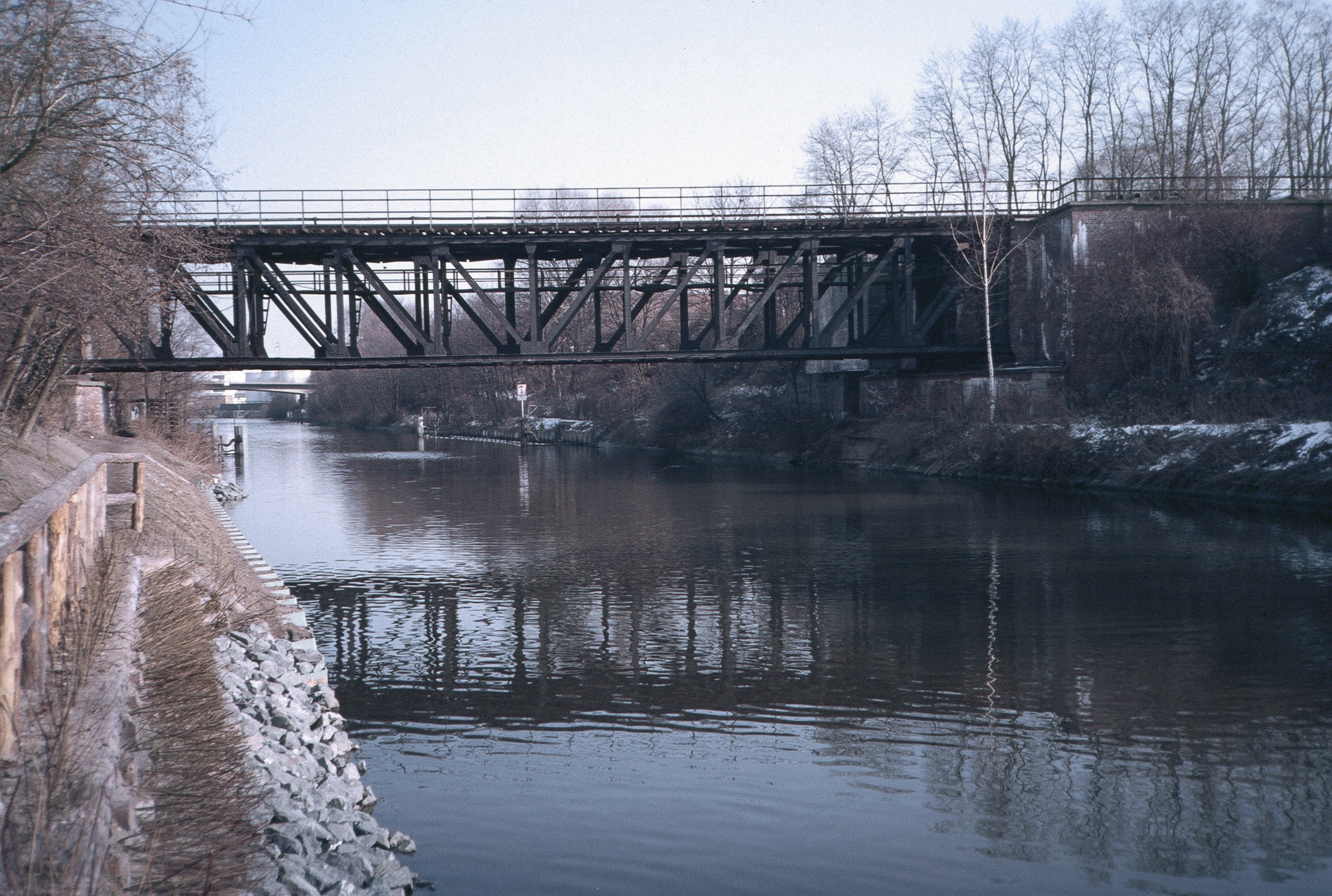
Single-track bridge over the Teltow Canal, 1987

After the war, traffic on the line was restored to operation a section at a time. Services were restored between Yorckstraße and Südende on 8 June 1945 and to Lichterfelde Süd on August 17, originally as a single track. The second track south of the Teltow Canal Bridge was taken back into operation on 18 July 1946; in contrast the S-Bahn line near the bridge still remains single-track. The southern part of the Nord-Süd tunnel was reopened in the summer of 1946, but traffic on the ramp between Anhalter Bahnhof and Yorckstraße only resumed on 15 August 1946.

In subsequent years, the effects of the division of Germany on the line became more and more noticeable. The suburban line to Großbeeren was still used until 1952. Electric S-Bahn operations between Lichterfelde Süd and Teltow were restored in 1951. Train services from the south ended in Teltow, where passengers had to switch to the S-Bahn to reach Berlin. The tracks of the suburban railway between Teltow and Ludwigsfelde were removed and have not been restored. After the Berlin Wall was built on 13 August 1961, the S-Bahn ceased operations south of Lichterfelde Süd.

Parts of the embankment of the suburban railway can still be seen between the Berlin city limits and the south of Großbeeren. Some other relics, such as the stairs to the suburban platform in Großbeeren, were removed during railway reconstruction after 1990.

=== Operation and closure after 1980 ===
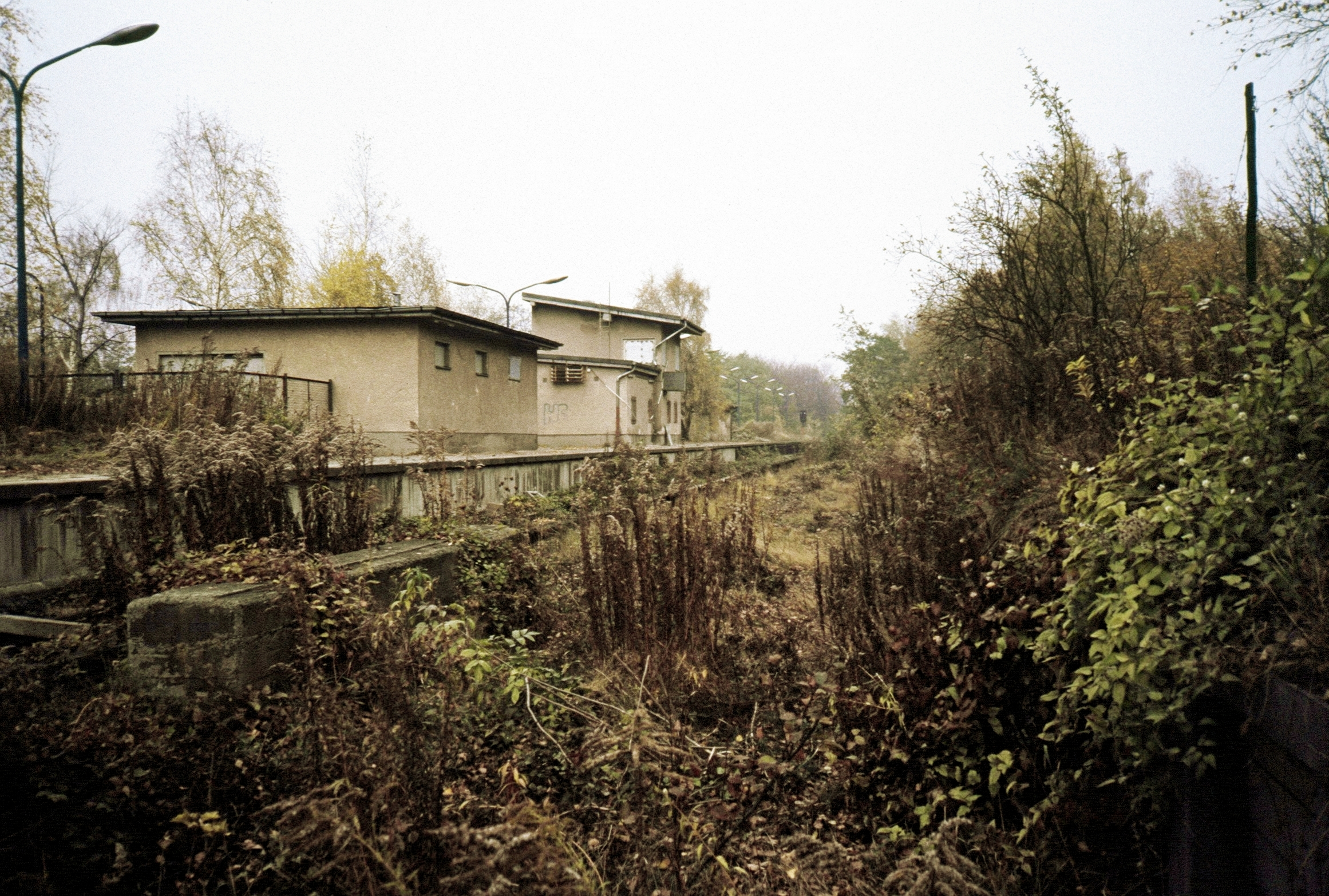
An overgrown Lichterfelde Süd station in 1987

After a strike by West Berlin employees of the East German Railways in September 1980 the Anhalt suburban line continued operating, unlike some other lines. On 8 January 1984 it was closed down after its takeover by the Berliner Verkehrsbetriebe (Berlin Transportation Company), because the West Berlin Senate (government) did not consider the operation of the line as economically viable. North of Priesterweg the line continued to be used for trains on the Dresden railway to Lichtenrade.

As a result, plans were discussed for S-Bahn operations on the Anhalt line to be partly replaced by a guided bus system developed by Daimler-Benz. The Senate hoped to benefit from substantial Federal funding for the project. This project would have required the complete replacement of the railway by a concrete busway. Entrance and exit ramps would also have been necessary. Its construction required the total demolition of the railway infrastructure on the Anhalt line. The plan proved to be politically and technically unfeasible.

=== Reopening after 1990 ===
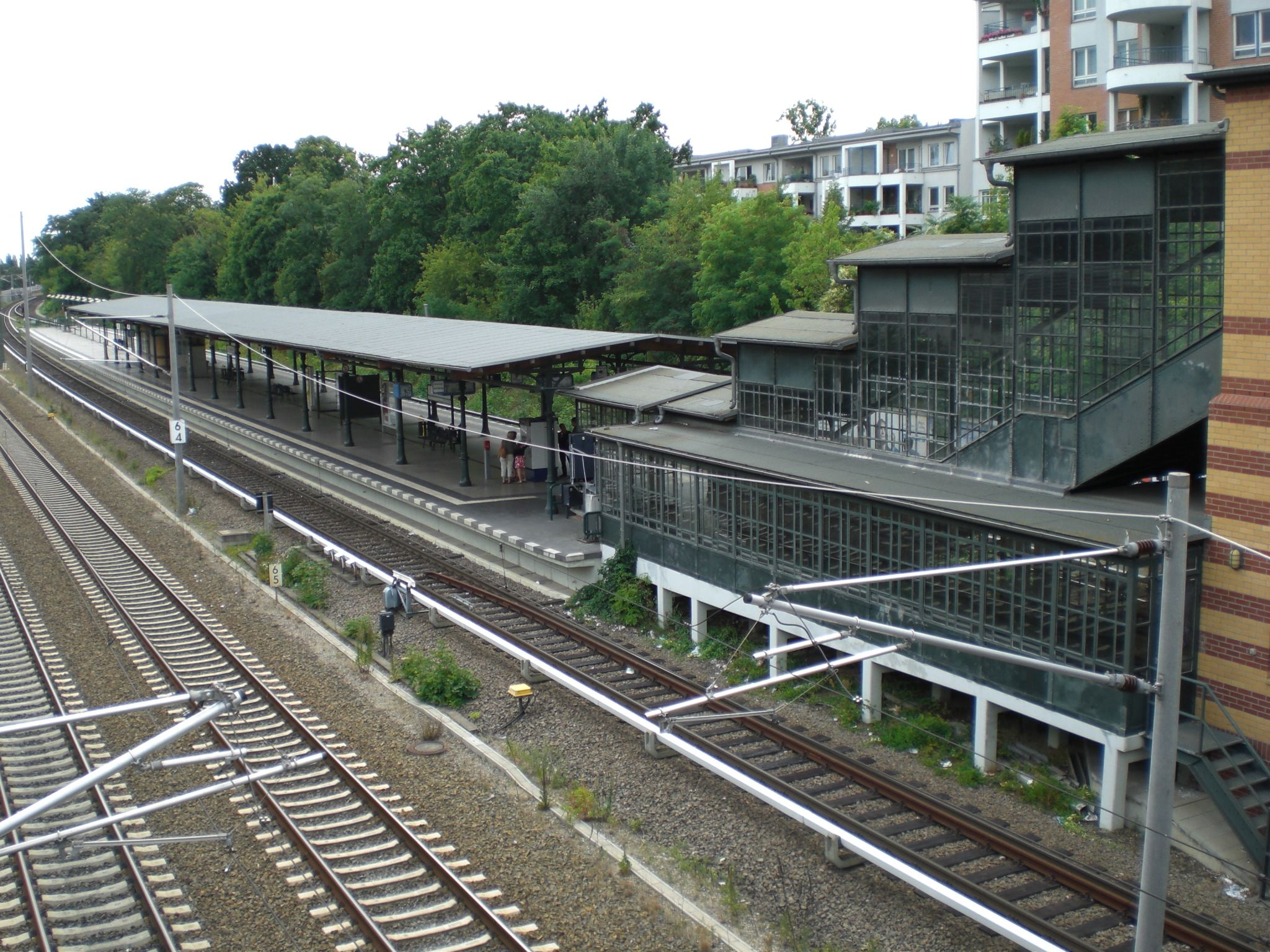
Südende station, re-opened in 1995

After the reunification of Germany, the S-Bahn on the Anhalt Railway was restored in several stages. The section from Priesterweg to Lichterfelde Ost was restored on 28 May 1995 and the route to Lichterfelde Süd was reopened on 27 September 1998. Osdorfer Straße station was built between Lichterfelde Ost and Lichterfelde Süd.

The new Berlin-Lichterfelde Süd–Teltow Stadt railway was opened on 24 February 2005. This line was based on old plans. The idea of connecting the Stahnsdorf Cemetery Railway with the Anhalt S-Bahn line at Teltow dates back to the 1930s. The first earthworks were begun during the Second World War. The original plans for further construction to Stahnsdorf are not being pursued and the route is not being protected. Teltow Stadt station is near the centre of Teltow. The route planning from the 1930s was used in the new construction despite the delays. The S-Bahn line branches to the west from the Anhalt line at Berlin-Lichterfelde Süd station, shortly before the Berlin city limits.

Teltow station on the Anhalt line is now only served by regional services. The platforms of the suburban tracks were demolished after 2000 during the upgrade of the Anhalt line. The embankment of the suburban line to Großbeeren has been preserved, but it is no longer used. In the Birkengrund area trains operate over both the former long-distance tracks and the former suburban tracks.

In February 2014, the new Zugbeeinflussungssystem S-Bahn Berlin (Berlin S-Bahn train control system) was put into operation on the section between Yorckstraße and Lichterfelde Süd (and continuing to Teltow Stadt). This replaced the old system based on train stop equipment.

== Passenger services ==
S-Bahn services operated as follows on the Anhalt suburban line after the completion of the North-South tunnel:

- 6 November 1939: Lichterfelde Ost–Berlin Friedrichstraße–Velten
- 9 August 1943: an extension was opened from Lichterfelde Ost to Lichterfelde Süd
- 1945: Lichterfelde Ost–Bernau bei Berlin
- 1951: Teltow (suburban line, Anhalter Railway)–Bernau.
- 13 August 1961: Lichterfelde Süd–Gesundbrunnen
