= Berlin-Lichterfelde Süd–Teltow Stadt railway =

Railway line in Germany

Coordinates: 52.3969°N 13.2764°E

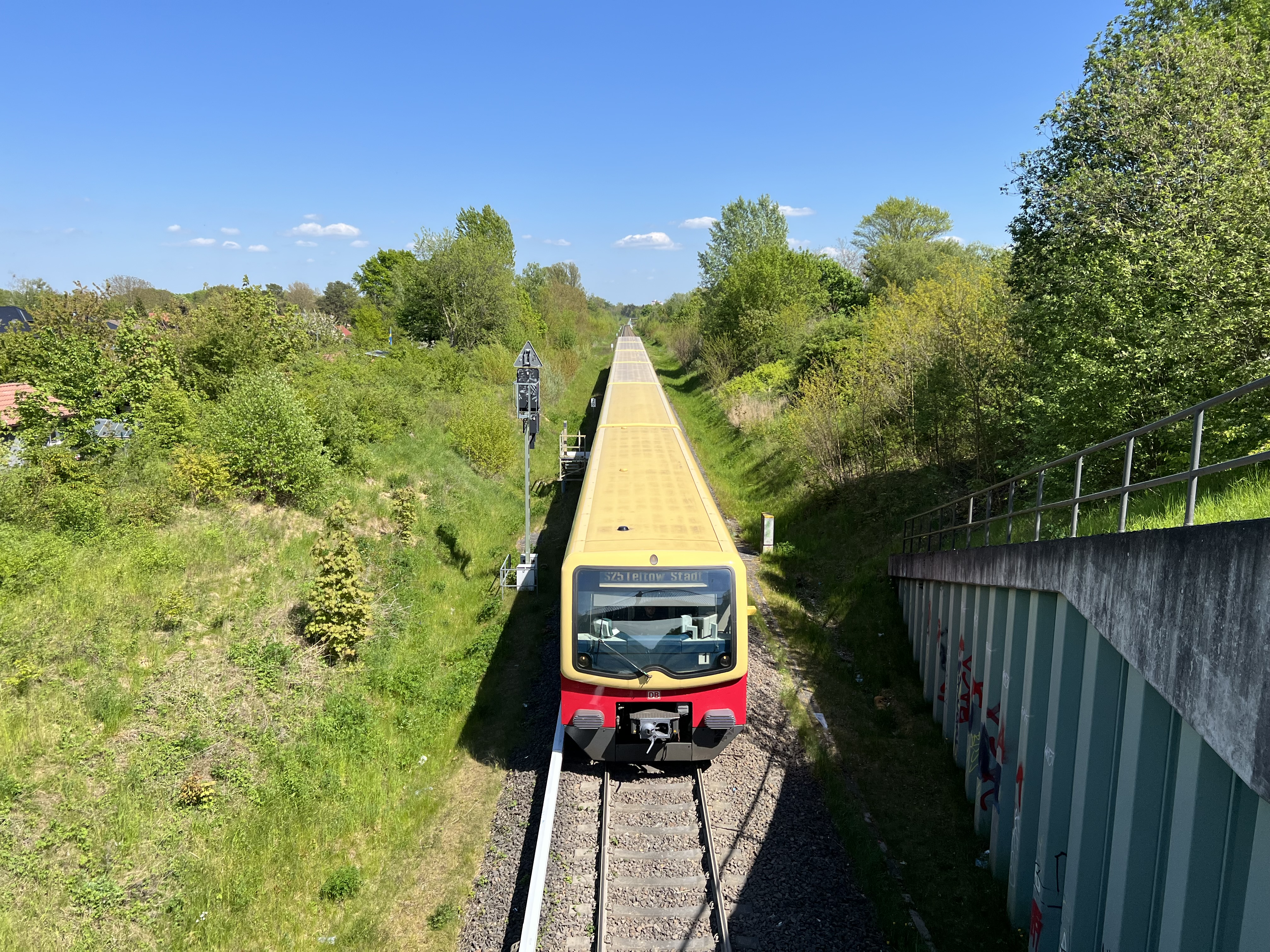
- Teltow Stadt station

Overview
- Line number: 6039
- Locale: Berlin, Brandenburg, Germany
- Termini: Lichterfelde Süd; Teltow Stadt

Service
- Route number: 200.25

History
- Opened: 24 February 2005

Technical
- Line length: 2.8 km (1.7 mi)
- Track gauge: 1,435 mm (4 ft 8 1/2 in) standard gauge
- Electrification: 750 V third rail

The Berlin-Lichterfelde Süd–Teltow Stadt railway is a single-track railway in the German states of Berlin and Brandenburg. It is electrified by bottom contact third rail at 750 V DC and is used by the trains on line S25 of the Berlin S-Bahn. The line begins in Lichterfelde Süd station and branches on the outskirts of Berlin from the Anhalt Suburban Line. The line was opened to Teltow Stadt (Teltow town) in 2005. There were already plans for this line and an extension to Stahnsdorf in the period between the two world wars.

== History ==
The first plans for a connection from the Anhalt Suburban Line at Lichterfelde to the town of Teltow and the Cemetery Railway (Friedhofsbahn) in Stahnsdorf already existed in the 1920s. In the 1930s, the Nazis were planning an extensive reconstruction of the Berlin railway infrastructure, especially in the south of the city. This S-Bahn line was planned. Between central Teltow and Stahnsdorf, a freight line would also run parallel to it to provide a more direct connection from the Großbeeren marshalling yard via Stahnsdorf to Potsdam. Neither project was realised, but earthworks were constructed in several places. Provision was made for the planned line during the reconstruction of Lichterfelde Süd station up to 1943, including the building of two platforms.

After the end of World War II and the subsequent division of Germany, these plans were not pursued, but the route (at least in part) was retained.

After the re-opening of the S-Bahn to Lichterfelde Süd in 1998, there was growing interest in extending the line to Teltow. The ground-breaking ceremony for the extension of the line was carried out on 22 October 2003 and the line went into operation on 24 February 2005. In contrast to the original plans, the line was built as a single track and the construction of a station at Teltow-Seehof has not been implemented for the time being.

In February 2014, the new Zugbeeinflussungssystem S-Bahn Berlin train control system was put into operation on the line. This replaced the existing mechanical train stop system.
