= Expressway Potsdam-Schönefeld =

The Expressway Potsdam-Schönefeld is the overarching term for a number of transport projects to create a single four-lane, primarily grade-separated highway from Potsdam to Schönefeld south of Berlin, Germany.

The expressway plans were based on older East German plans. A route south of Berlin was strategically important, allowing traffic to run from Potsdam via Schönefeld to East Berlin without crossing West Berlin, thus allowing the construction of the Berlin Wall. The rail counterpart to this road link is the Berlin outer ring.

With the decision to expand Berlin Schönefeld Airport and turn it into Berlin-Brandenburg International Airport, plans to create the Potsdam-Schönefeld highway link were revived. The initial timetable for opening of the new airport in 2010 matched that of the four-lane expressway. After opening the last bypass sections at Güterfelde and Mahlow in late 2014, the road link was completed.

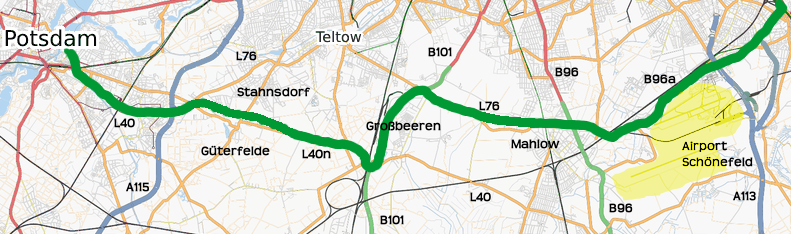

== Nutheschnellstraße ==
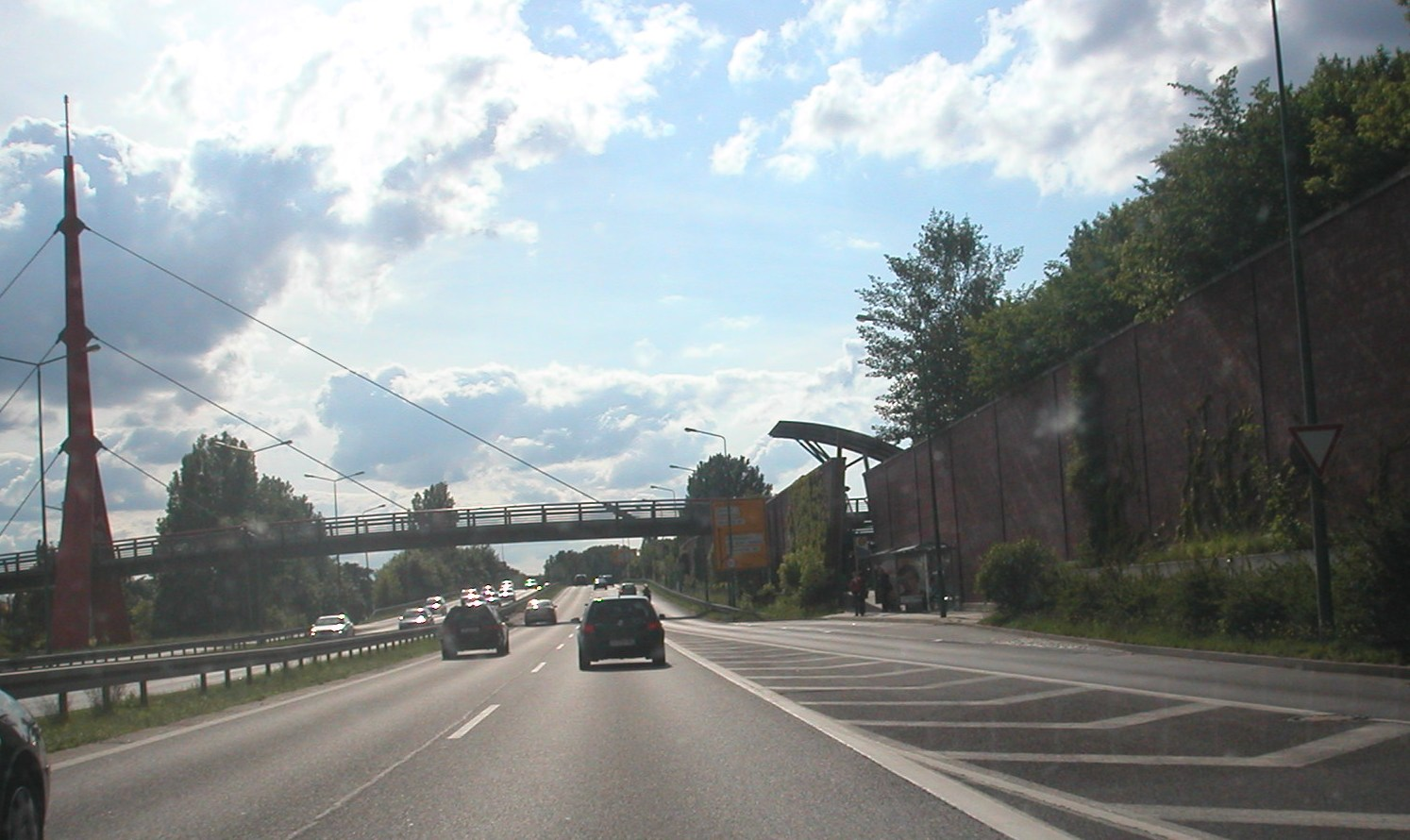
Nuthe Expressway near Potsdam-Stern

The first section is the Nutheschnellstraße (literally "Nuthe Expressway" deriving its name from the river Nuthe), which is an expressway that was already constructed in the 1970s to connect Potsdam city center with its boroughs on the other side of the River Havel in Potsdam-Schlaatz, Potsdam-Stern and Potsdam-Drewitz which are mostly Plattenbau housing estates that were under development at the time. In Potsdram-Drewitz the expressway is connected to the Autobahn A 115 motorway that runs via the AVUS to Berlin's City-West.

The Nuthe Expressway ends shortly after the motorway bridge at junction Güterfelde (in planning documents called "Güterfelder Eck"). The traffic flow is north-east straight ahead on the road link "L 76" that runs directly through the built-up areas of Stahnsdorf and Teltow which features major congestion during rush hour. The new expressway was planned as a bypass south of Stahnsdorf / Teltow and running north of the "L 40" in Güterfelde / Ruhlsdorf such that the "new L 40" ("L40n") would be connected to the motorway B 101 south of Großbeeren. The section from Großbeeren to Güterfelde was opened in April 2006 leaving a road section through Güterfelde town to the Nuthe expressway at its end.

== L76 Teltow-Mahlow ==
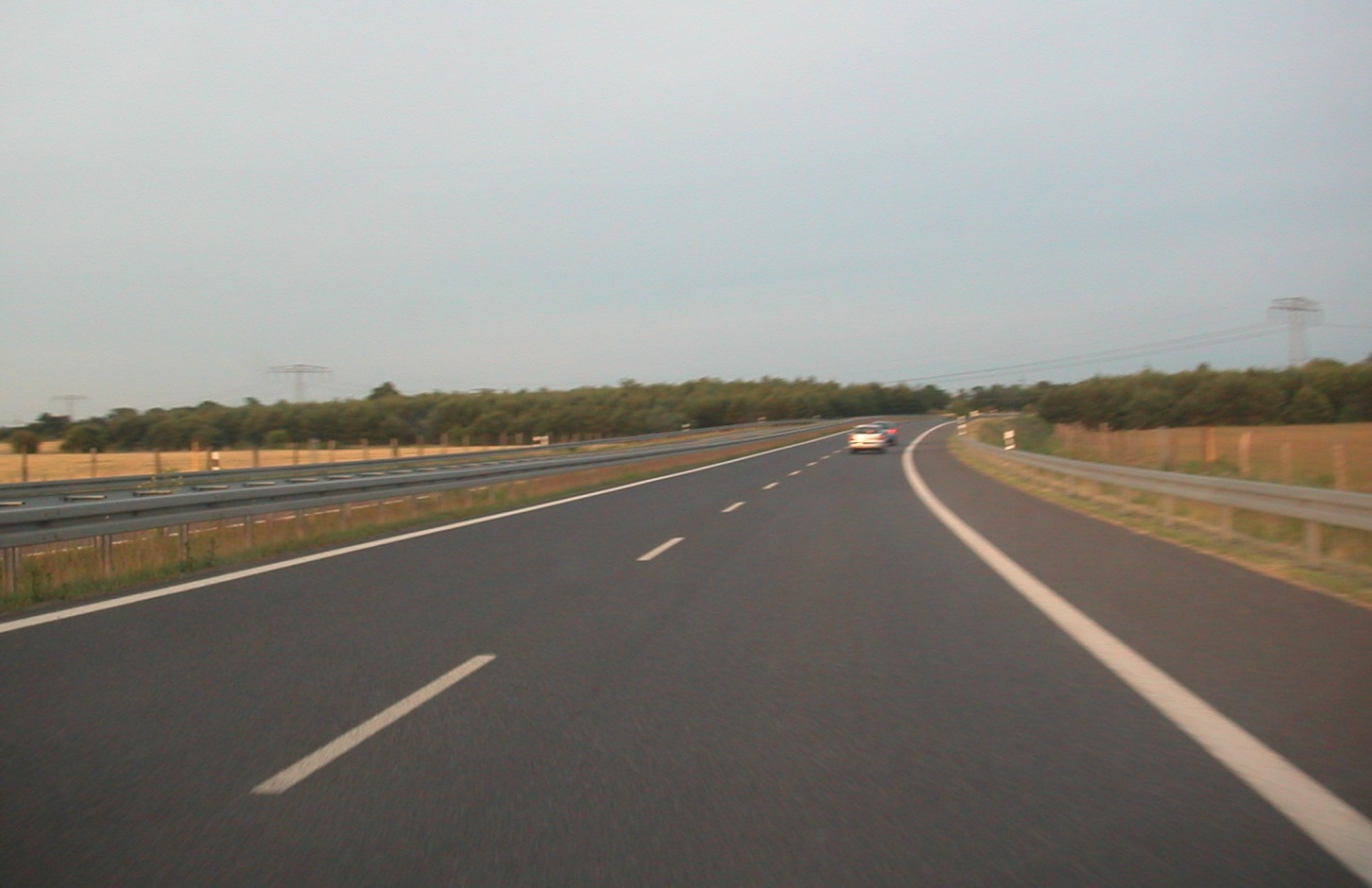
expressway bypass near Mahlow

On the East end of Teltow the road link "L 76" is running as a rural road to Mahlow's West end. Near Teltow there is already an exit of the motorway B 101 north of Großbeeren. The new expressway has replaced the old rural road completely and feature an interchange junction with the B 101. This section of the expressway was openened in the second half of 2010.

At the East end of Mahlow the expressway was discontinuous until December 2014, when the Western bypass was opened. Until then the traffic had to enter the old village for a short section up to the older bypass. The Eastern bypass for Mahlow had been constructed in the 1980s, featuring a four-lane expressway running below a railway track that was a major point of congestion before. The two ends of this old bypass are not grade-separated, however.

The Mahlow bypass track was later extended to the B 96 junction in the 1990s which was changed into a partial cloverleaf interchange during the upgrade of the B 96 into a four-lane expressway (between Rangsdorf and Berlin city limits). The road link continues from there with federal funding as B 96a.

== B96a Mahlow-Schönefeld ==
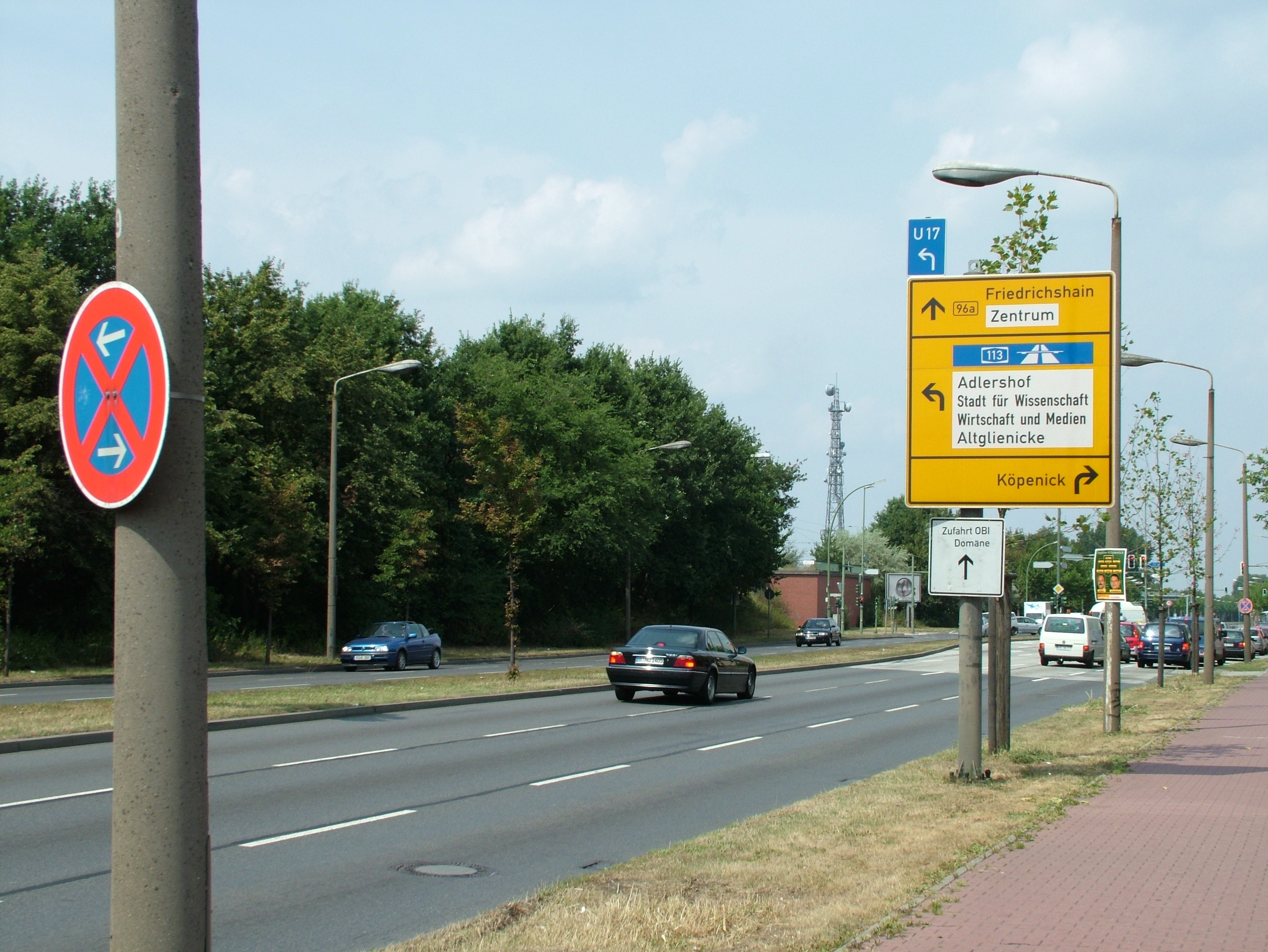
B 96a at the southern border of Berlin

The federal road B96 (named F96 at the time) was one of the most important road links in the former GDR connecting the southern mountains of the country via its capital to the northern coast. However, the original route was running right through Berlin-West, which was blocked with the Berlin Wall. As a replacement an alternate route (later named "B96a") was created that would branch away from the old B96 near Mahlow running east via Schöneld to the southern borders of Berlin-East. It would then continue through the city to the northern border of Berlin-East, where it would connect again with the old B96 near Birkenwerder.

In the course of planning for the expansion of the airport Berlin-Schoenefeld into an international air hub, the expansion plans for the B96a were also revived and revised. An expressway connection from Schönefeld to Waßmannsdorf was opened already in the 1990s. In 2002 the expressway from the B96 interchange near Mahlow was extended to the bridge across the Berlin outer ring. Finally in October 2007 the expressway was completed with a section from that Bridge to Waßmannsdorf, making it a dual carriageway with a design speed of 120 km/h although there are some junctions that are not grade-separated.

== Further plans ==
In May 2008, new Autobahn section A 113 was connected to the B96a in the west end of Schönefeld. That A 113 motorway does connect to the Airport area south of Schönefeld town. As a consequence the sections of the B96a west of that interchange are expected to be degraded to normal roads in the future.

The expressway from Schönefeld to Potsdam is nearly completed but for two areas. The first one is the Güterfelde town, where a bypass was opposed by a citizen initiative that was not wanting the route to run north of the town center thereby cutting off the Kienwerder borough. A route south of the town was proposed, but it would have been considerably longer as it would not have been connected to the current western end of the Nuthe Expressway but east of it near Drewitz where a new interchange would have been to be created. Finally this proposal was dumped in April 2008 by court approval of the northern bypass. The construction of the first part at the western end (near the Nuthe Expressway) started in January 2009. Some appeals were blocking the construction start at the eastern end (near Marggraffshof settlement) which were rejected in 2010, and the section opened in 2012. The eastern and western construction works will meet in late 2013 and the construction of the expressway near Güterfeld is expected to be finished in late 2014.

The other constriction area is in the western part of Mahlow that needs a connection to the rest of the Mahlow bypass. This plan is largely not disputed, but the land area was not bought either so far. It is expected that, with the opening of the route L 76 from Mahlow to Teltow in August 2010, the construction works will extend to this last section. The first part of the eastern bypass will be finished at the end of the September 2013, the construction project will continue till October 2014.

The Berlin-Brandenburg International Airport construction was delayed in court and the opening had been rescheduled for October 2011 accordingly. Due to some problems the construction had been already late which expectations to see the opening of the airport in 2012. The legal problems in Maggraffshof near Güterfelde induced a delay for the completion of the expressway up to 2014. In May 2012 the airport construction was halted, however, with investigations to show requirements of a complete overhaul not to be finished before 2014, which by chance makes neither airport construction nor expressway construction to be out of sync anymore.

The connection from Potsdam to Schönefeld is 40 km long – it took 50 minutes travel time (40 minutes in 2009) that will fall below 30 minutes after completion of the expressway.
