= Sabine Uecker =

German politician (born 1943)

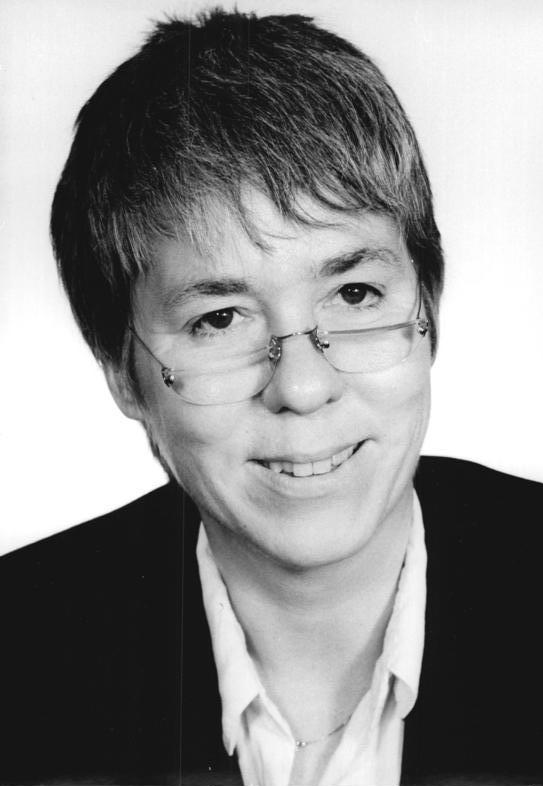

Member of the Bundestag
- In office 3 October 1990 – 20 December 1990

Member of the Volkskammer for Bezirk Potsdam
- In office 18 March 1990 – 2 October 1990

Personal details
- Born: 1 May 1943 (age 83) Potsdam, Free State of Prussia, Germany
- Party: SDP (since 1990)
- Other political affiliations: SDP (East Germany) (1989–1990)

Sabine Uecker (born 1 May 1943) is a German chemical engineer and politician who served in the Volkskammer and the reunified Bundestag in 1990. A member of the Social Democratic Party, she represented the town of Teltow.

== Biography ==
Sabine Uecker was born on 1 May 1943 in Potsdam, Brandenburg. Her parents were both teachers, and she grew up in East Germany. She received her Abitur in 1961, and began studying chemical engineering. A resident of the town of Teltow, she was the head of research and development at VEB Electronic Components Teltow in 1990.

In November 1989, Uecker co-founded a branch of the Social Democratic Party in Teltow. She was elected to the Volkskammer in the March 1990 East German general election, the only free and fair parliamentary election in the country's history, representing the Potsdam District as a member of the SDP. She served in the Volkskammer until 2 October 1990, as Germany reunified the following day. Uecker immediately began serving in the Bundestag as a member of the reunified Social Democratic Party, sitting on the Committee on Labor and Social Affairs. She ran for re-election in the 1990 German federal election, but was defeated.

Uecker was also a member of the Teltow city council and the Potsdam-Mittelmark district council from 1990 until 1995. After leaving parliament, she became the head of the Brandenburg State Ministry for Labour, Social Affairs, Health and Women; she held the position until her retirement in 2006.
