= Lichterfelde Süd station =

Railway station in Berlin, Germany

Lichterfelde Süd
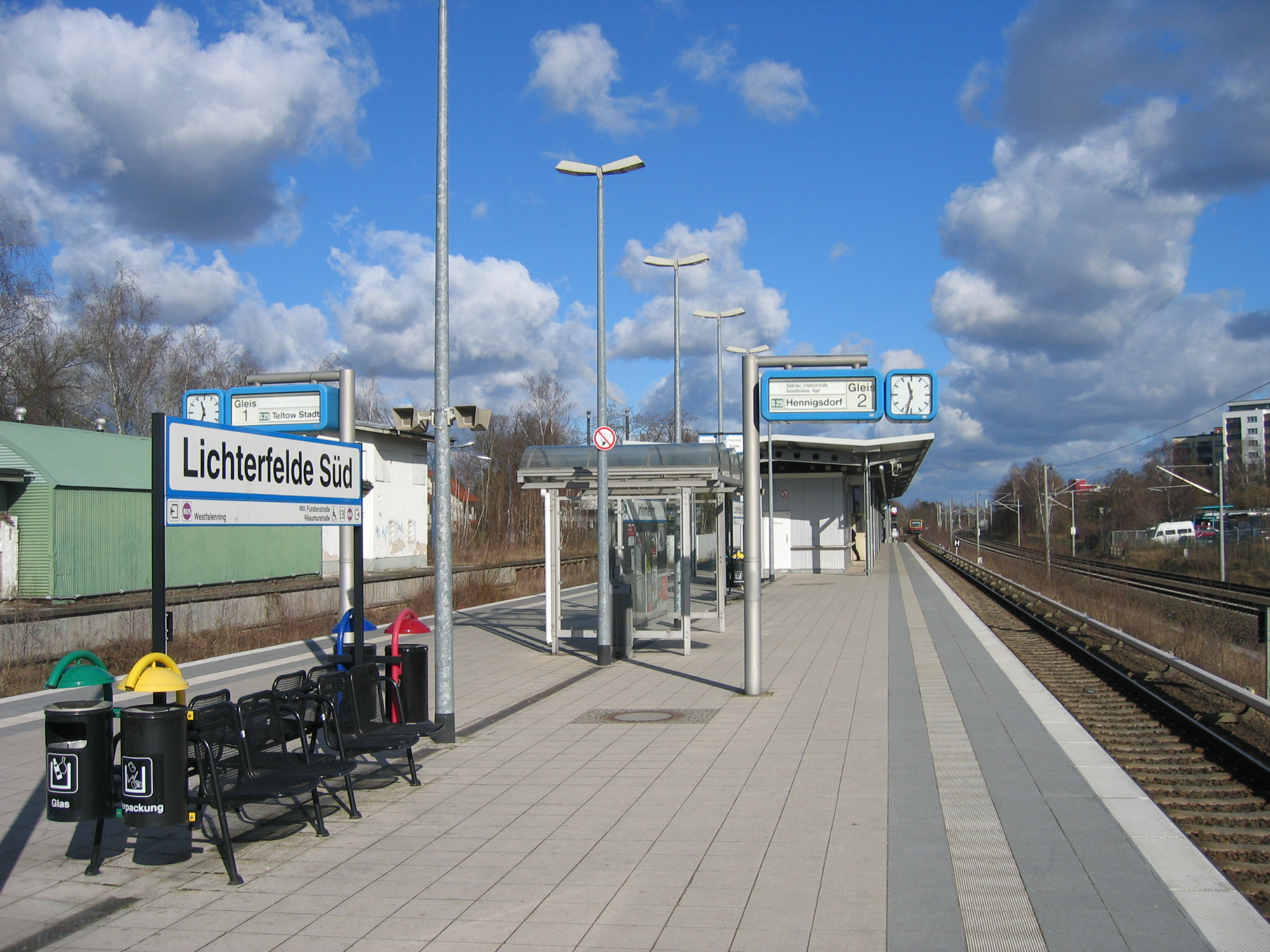
- Platform

General information
- Location: Holtheimer Weg, Lichterfelde, Berlin; Germany
- Coordinates: 52°24′36″N 13°18′31″E
- Owner: DB Netz
- Operator: DB Station&Service
- Lines: Anhalt Suburban Line; Berlin-Lichterfelde Süd–Teltow Stadt railway
- Platforms: 2

Construction
- Accessible: Yes

Other information
- Station code: 7730
- DS100 code: BLIS
- IBNR: 8089472
- Category: 5
- Fare zone: : Berlin B/5656
- Website: sbahn.berlin; www.bahnhof.de

History
- Opened: 1 August 1893; 25 September 1998
- Closed: 9 January 1984

Services
Preceding station	Berlin S-Bahn	Following station
Osdorfer Straße towards Hennigsdorf	S25	Teltow Stadt Terminus
Osdorfer Straße towards Blankenburg	S26	Teltow Stadt Terminus
Location
- Location within Berlin

Berlin-Lichterfelde Süd station is a Berlin S-Bahn station on the Anhalt Suburban Line in Lichterfelde in the Berlin borough of Steglitz-Zehlendorf. The station was the southern terminus for S-Bahn trains on the Anhalt Suburban Line between 1943 and 1951, between 1961 and 1984 and between 1998 and 2005. From 1951 until the building of the Berlin Wall, services continued past the city limits to nearby Teltow. The station was closed between 1984 and 1998. Since 2005, the trains have run to Teltow Stadt.

Together with Osdorfer Straße station, this connects the Thermometersiedlung high-rise housing estate to the Berlin S-Bahn network.

== History ==
Lichterfelde experienced a construction boom in the Gründerzeit (in the late 19th century) and new estates extended to Giesensdorf (now part of Lichterfelde Süd). At the beginning of the 1890s, there was a proposal to build another Villenviertel (villa estate) next to the Berlin–Halle railway (Anhalt Railway). The Volksbau-Gesellschaft ("people's construction company") that acquired the required land in Giesensdorf succeeded in having a new station built on the line in 1893 to open up the land for the new estate. The original desire to extend suburban operations to Lichterfelde, however, was not met and traffic was limited to a few long-distance trains. As Giesensdorf and Lichterfelde had been merged in 1878 to form the rural municipality (Landgemeinde) of Groß-Lichterfelde ("Greater Lichterfelde"), the new station was called Groß-Lichterfelde Süd (south), the old Lichterfelde station was renamed Groß-Lichterfelde Ost (east) to distinguish it. The suburban railway constructed in 1901 and electrified in 1903 only reached as far as Groß-Lichterfelde Ost. Groß-Lichterfelde Süd remained a mainline station with two side platforms.

Under the Greater Berlin Act of 1920, the borders of the capital was moved to just south of Lichterfelde Süd. In 1925, the station was renamed as Lichterfelde Süd. It was also still classified as a long-distance station and therefore fares were significantly higher than they would have been if suburban fares had been applied. When suburban fares were extended to it in 1938, it was one of the last parts of Greater Berlin to be included in the Berlin suburban fare zone.

In the Nazi era, as part of the planning for World Capital Germania, an extension of the suburban line via Lichterfelde Süd and Teltow to Trebbin was planned along with a new line to be built from Lichterfelde Süd to Stahnsdorf to link there with the Cemetery Railway to Wannsee.

The station was rebuilt in 1942/1943 with two central platforms equipped for S-Bahn operations, while the mainline tracks now had no platforms. S-Bahn services were extended from Lichterfelde Ost to Lichterfelde Süd on 9 August 1943. Initially, only the western platform A was used, but later a two-track system was used. Steam trains operated from Lichterfelde Süd to Ludwigsfelde.

After the war ended, the long-distance services were gradually thinned out, not least because West Berlin could only be reached via long-distance services. The freed-up capacity meant that a long-distance track was now available to be electrified and upgraded as an S-Bahn line to Teltow. The 2.6 km long section was opened to traffic on 7 July 1951. Trains passes south of the station on the long-distance track and then ran on single track to the south.

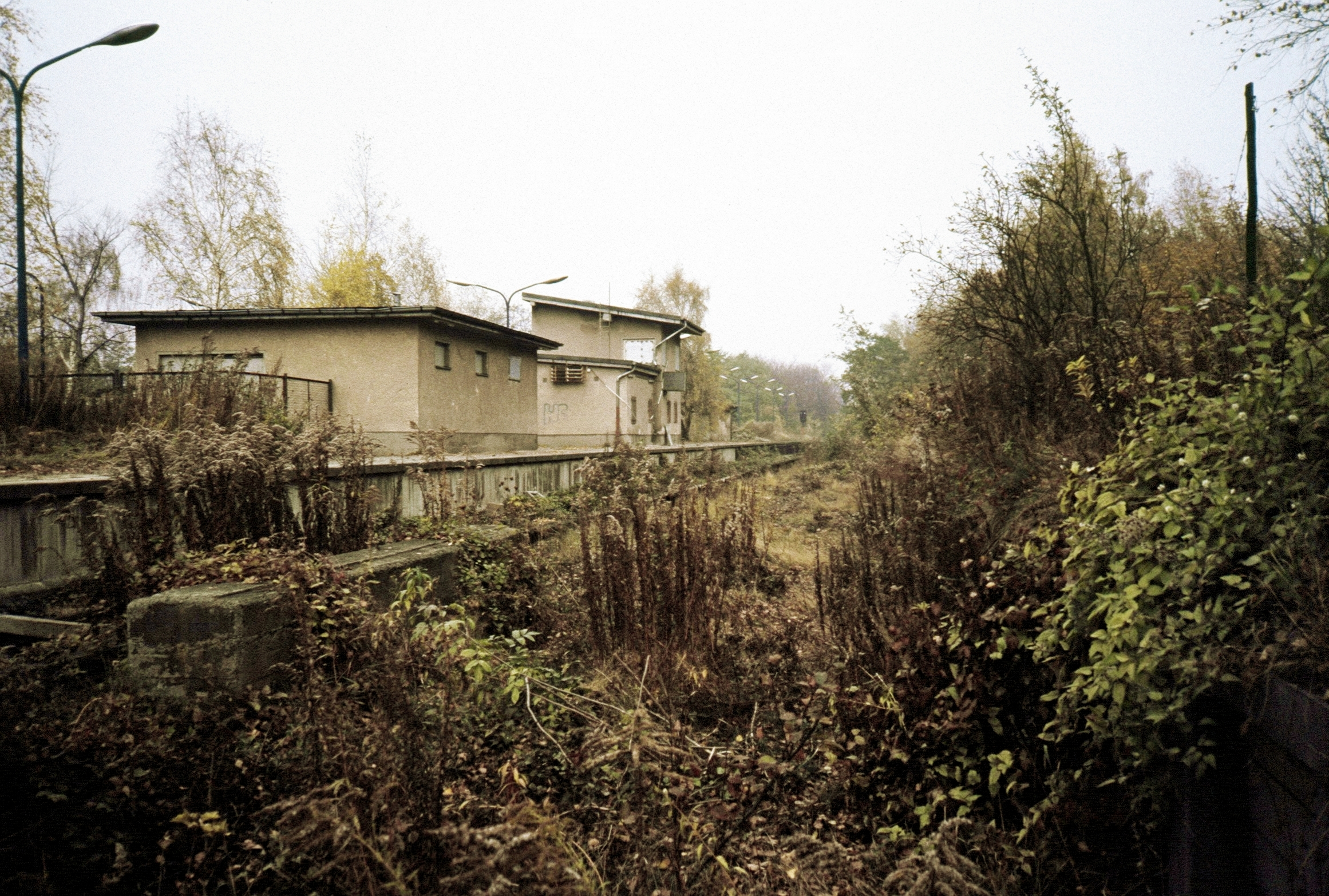
An overgrown Lichterfelde Süd station, 1987

The Berlin Wall was built during the night of 12 and 13 August 1961 and Lichterfelde Süd again became the terminus of S-Bahn trains on the Anhalt Railway, which was now blocked south of Lichterfelde. Shortly after the border was closed, the line was reopened but only for a single movement, as an S-Bahn train had been stuck in Teltow when the wall was built.

Subsequently traffic on the line fell steadily. This was mainly due to the boycott of the S-Bahn in West Berlin, as it was suggested to passengers in West Berlin that the fare revenues were being used to finance the border fortifications. This situation meant that the staff was steadily reduced. When the station finally had no staff to sell tickets, passengers had to buy tickets at the station’s signal box; the exchange of ticket and change was carried out using a basket that was lowered from the signal box to the passenger.

When Deutsche Reichsbahn's West Berlin-based workers went on strike of September 1980, it initially maintained services on the line, unlike on some other lines. It was finally closed on 9 January 1984 after its takeover by the Berliner Verkehrsbetriebe (Berlin Transportation Company). The railway facilities remained unused and deteriorated, although the administration building was later converted into a dance hall.

After the reunification of Germany, it was agreed that the Berlin S-Bahn network would be restored as far as possible back to the condition of 1961, so the re-opening of the Anhalt line was expected. This was carried out in two steps in 1995 and 1998, with the reopening of the S-Bahn from Priesterweg. Work in Lichterfelde Süd began only in 1997, one year before the reopening. The old platform B was dismantled and a new central platform was built in its place. Platform A, some old structures and the signal box were retained. The first trains station started running from Lichterfelde Ost on 28 September 1998. The Berlin-Lichterfelde Süd–Teltow Stadt railway was opened on 24 February 2005. This line used the first three kilometres of a previously planned line to connect with the Cemetery Railway.

== Connections ==
The station is served by line S25 and line S26 of the Berlin S-Bahn. It is also connected to the bus network of Berliner Verkehrsbetriebe (BVG). The following routes begin or end here:

- M85 (Lichterfelde Süd – Berlin Hauptbahnhof)
- 186 (Lichterfelde Süd – Grunewald)
- 284 (Lichterfelde Süd – Rathaus Steglitz)

== See also ==
- List of railway stations in Berlin
