= Teltow =

- Town
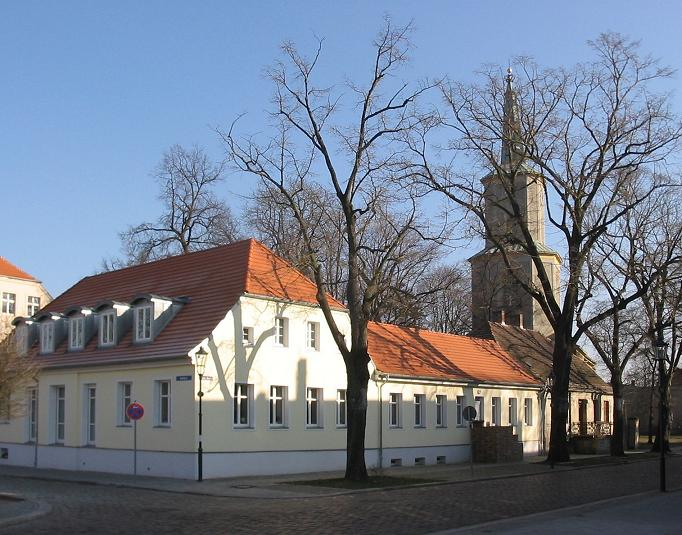
- Market place and St Andrew's

- Flag Coat of arms

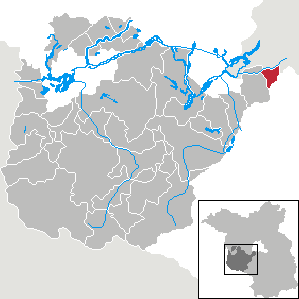
- Location of Teltow within Potsdam-Mittelmark district
- Interactive map of Teltow
- Location within Germany Location within Brandenburg
- Coordinates: 52°24′8″N 13°16′14″E
- Country: Germany
- State: Brandenburg
- District: Potsdam-Mittelmark
- Subdivisions: 2 Ortsteile

Government
  - Mayor (2017–25): Andre Freymuth (CDU)

Area
  - Total: 21.6 km^{2} (8.3 sq mi)
- Elevation: 39 m (128 ft)

Population (2025-12-31)
  - Total: 27,698
  - Density: 1,280/km^{2} (3,320/sq mi)
- Time zone: UTC+01:00 (CET)
  - Summer (DST): UTC+02:00 (CEST)
- Postal codes: 14513
- Dialling codes: 03328
- Vehicle registration: PM
- Website: www.teltow.de

Teltow (German pronunciation: [ˈtɛltoː]) is a town in the Potsdam-Mittelmark district, in Brandenburg, Germany.

== Geography ==
Teltow is part of the agglomeration of Berlin. The distance to the Berlin city centre is 17 km (11 mi), while the distance to Potsdam is 15 km (9.3 mi).

The Teltow Canal links the River Havel near the city of Potsdam with the River Dahme near Köpenick in Berlin's eastern suburbs. It passes immediately to the north of Teltow, forming the border between Brandenburg and Berlin.

The central Teltow Stadt railway station is part of the Berlin S-Bahn line S25. Teltow railway station is 2 kilometres (1.2 mi) to the south-east and is served by RegionalExpress lines 3, 4 and 5.

== Protected specialty ==
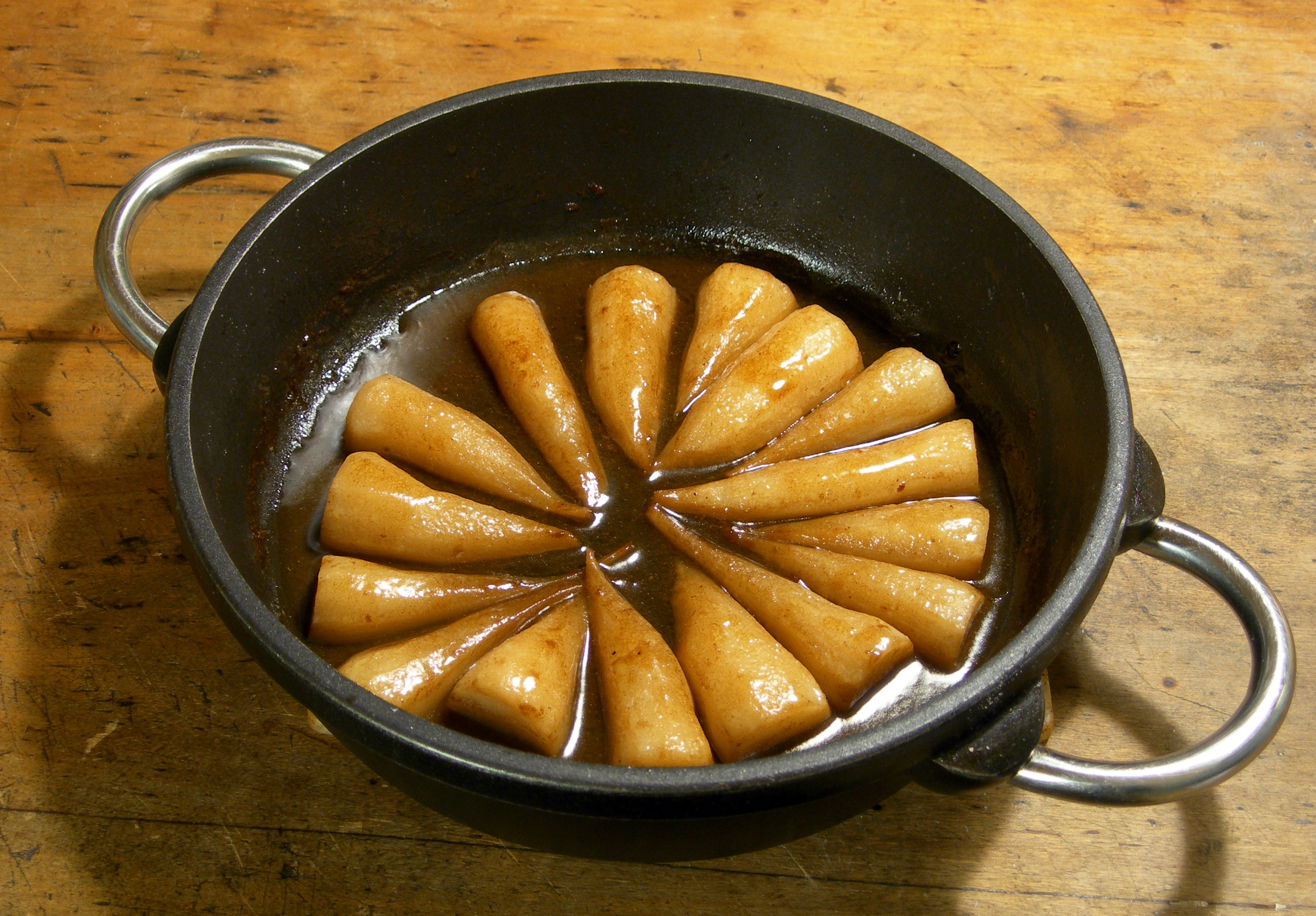
Teltow turnips

Teltower Rübchen (English: Teltow turnips) are a well known regional specialty; however, yield, homogeneity and handling properties are sub-optimal. Since 1993 they have been registered as a trademark.

== History ==
The settlement was first mentioned in a 1265 deed issued by Margrave Otto III of Brandenburg. It received its name from the eponymous plateau, a moraine of the last glacial period. Teltow was formerly known for the Teltower Rübchen (Brassica rapa ssp. rapa f. teltowiensis), a special type of turnip quite popular in the 18th and 19th century. The main sight of the town is the Protestant St Andrew's fieldstone church of the 12th century rebuilt in 1812 according to plans by Karl Friedrich Schinkel. It was depicted by Lyonel Feininger in his 1918 painting Teltow II.

Teltow shared its borders with the former West Berlin, and so during the period 1961–1990 it was separated from it by the Berlin Wall.

Max Malecki (1949) and Herbert Pucher (1952) were the first two 1st secretaries of the SED district administration in Teltow. On the basis of the administrative reform in the GDR in 1952 the circle Teltow was dissolved and Teltow assigned to the district of Potsdam in the newly formed district of Potsdam. In the period of the Soviet occupation zone and the GDR until 1961 there was a significant population loss. After the construction of the Berlin Wall in 1961, the Teltow Canal on the northern boundary of Teltow formed the border to West Berlin. In the east the wall limited the districts Seehof and Sigridshorst. In the residential areas near the border with West Berlin, after the construction of the Wall, "especially well-deserved SED comrades and other loyalists" were settled, whom the regime assumed would not flee to the West. The residential development on the border was accessible only under strict access restriction. Hans-Jürgen Starrost, Klaus Garden and Roland Hoff were killed by the GDR while attempting to escape from Teltow to West Berlin.

An important event for the development of Teltow in January 1946 was the founding of Askania Feinmechanik und Optik GmbH, which developed systems for the automation of industrial processes. 1948 Askania was like all larger enterprises in national property VEB mechanics Askania Teltow transferred and renamed 1954 into VEB equipment and regulator works Teltow (GRW Teltow). In 1962, the GDR’s Economics Council granted GRW Teltow nationwide responsibility for the operating, measuring and control technology (BMSR technology) in the GDR. The company grew to about 12,000 employees in the 1970s and was the center of automation technology in the GDR.

The second large industrial enterprise in Teltow was the VEB electronic components "Carl v. Chr. Ossietzky "(CvO), which resulted from the transfer of the Dralowid work in 1948 in VEB Dralowid and the renaming in 1953 in VEB work for components of telecommunications" Carl von Ossietzky "(WBN). By 1955, 30 million sheet resistors were produced by hand each year. The production number could be increased to three million resistances per day in the following decades until 1989. In the WBN 1951 started the starting signal for the structure of the new industry branch semiconductor technology in the GDR with first research work to semiconductors. Under the direction of Matthias Falter, the employees of the WBN research department produced the first samples of high-end transistors in 1953.

Urban planning of the 1960s resulted in the almost complete demolition and redevelopment of Teltow’s downtown. Only the church, the cinema and a part of Kuppelmayrschen settlement was preserved. In the 1980s, planners in Teltow began a process of rethinking. Initially, individual objects were listed as historical monuments, and in 1986, parts of the old town were declared area features.

Accompanying the development of industry new areas for housing were developed and developed: 1961 to 1965, the Neue Wohnstadt, 1970 laying the cornerstone for the residential complex Bodestraße in the river district; 1987 to 1989, the residential area Ruhlsdorfer Platz, 2005, the musicians quarter, 2006, the construction field mill village with the final expansion possible 442 single-family, double and terraced houses. At the end of 2008 Teltow had 21 residential areas.

The present municipality was established in 1994 by the merger of Teltow and the village of Ruhlsdorf which lies just to the southwest. It has seen a major increase of population since the fall of the Berlin Wall and German reunification. In 2005, German painter Markus Lüpertz installed his studio of sculpture at Teltow.

== Demography ==
Development of population since 1875 within the current boundaries (blue line: population; dotted line: comparison to population development in Brandenburg state; grey background: time of Nazi Germany; red background: time of communist East Germany)

Recent population development and projections (population development before 2011 census (blue line); recent population development according to the 2011 census (blue bordered line); official projections for 2005–2030 (yellow line); for 2017–2030 (scarlet line); for 2020–2030 (green line))

Teltow: Population development
within the current boundaries (2020)

| Year | Pop. | ±% p.a. |
|---|---|---|
| 1875 | 2,771 | — |
| 1890 | 3,364 | +1.30% |
| 1910 | 4,943 | +1.94% |
| 1925 | 6,281 | +1.61% |
| 1939 | 13,309 | +5.51% |
| 1950 | 12,864 | −0.31% |
| 1964 | 13,974 | +0.59% |

| Year | Pop. | ±% p.a. |
|---|---|---|
| 1971 | 16,179 | +2.12% |
| 1981 | 15,809 | −0.23% |
| 1985 | 15,355 | −0.73% |
| 1990 | 15,661 | +0.40% |
| 1995 | 15,576 | −0.11% |
| 2000 | 17,938 | +2.86% |
| 2005 | 19,972 | +2.17% |

| Year | Pop. | ±% p.a. |
|---|---|---|
| 2010 | 22,538 | +2.45% |
| 2015 | 25,483 | +2.49% |
| 2016 | 25,667 | +0.72% |
| 2017 | 25,761 | +0.37% |
| 2018 | 25,825 | +0.25% |
| 2019 | 26,902 | +4.17% |
| 2020 | 27,097 | +0.72% |

== Politics ==
Seats in the municipal assembly (Stadtverordnetenversammlung) as of 2008 elections:

- Social Democratic Party of Germany (SPD): 9
- The Left: 6
- Bürgerinitiative Teltow e. V. (BIT): 4
- Christian Democratic Union (CDU): 3
- Free Democratic Party (FDP): 3
- Alliance '90/The Greens: 2
- Independent: 1

== Transport ==
Since February 2005 Teltow has access to the Berlin S-Bahn network at Teltow Stadt station, which is at the end of the Berlin-Lichterfelde Süd–Teltow Stadt railway. Since 18 July 2011, the S-Bahn there in the 10-minute intervals, which had already ordered the state of Brandenburg in 2009, the S-Bahn Berlin could not afford due to lack of vehicles. Opened in 1901, Teltow Station on the Anhalter Bahn (Berlin-Lutherstadt Wittenberg railway line) offers connections to the regional express line RE 4 (Rathenow-Berlin-Ludwigsfelde) of Deutsche Bahn AG.

The transport project German unit No. 17 (Federal waterway connection Hannover-Magdeburg-Berlin) has the goal of making the Teltow Canal according to inland waterway classification Vb for large motor cargo vessels up to 110 meters in length and push assemblies up to 185 meters in length. Various environmental organizations have been protesting against the expansion since 1992 because of the feared massive intervention in the shores.

Via sections of the Expressway Potsdam-Schönefeld it is linked to the Potsdam city center as well as the Berlin-Schönefeld Airport.

Several bus services also pass through the Teltow area:

- X1: S Potsdam Hauptbahnhof ↔ Teltow, Bahnhof
- X10: Teltow, Rammrath-Brücke oder S Teltow Stadt ↔ S Zehlendorf ↔ S+U Berlin Zoologischer Garten
- 184: Teltow, Warthestraße ↔ Berlin-Lichterfelde Ost ↔ Tempelhof ↔ S Berlin Südkreuz
- 600: S Teltow Stadt ↔ S Mahlow (Mo–Sa)
- 601: S Potsdam Hauptbahnhof ↔ Teltow, Sigridshorst
- 602: S Potsdam Babelsberg ↔ Teltow Havelstraße (Mo–Fr, peak hours)
- 620: S Berlin Wannsee ↔ S Teltow Stadt
- 621: S Teltow Stadt ↔ Ludwigsfelde, Bahnhof (Mo–Fr)
- 624: Teltow, Warthestraße ↔ Saarmund, Bergstraße
- 625: Teltow, Ruhlsdorf ↔ Teltow, Postviertel (Paul-Lincke-Straße)
- 626: Teltow, Bügertreff (Heinersdorfer Weg) ↔ Stahnsdorf, Waldschänke
- 629: Teltow, Nuthestraße ↔ Stahnsdorf, Waldschänke
- 704: S Teltow Stadt ↔ S-Blankenfelde (Mo–Fr)

== Sports ==
Teltow is one of the three home towns of the basketball team TKS 49ers.

== Twin towns – sister cities ==
Teltow is twinned with:

- Ahlen, Germany (1991)
- Gonfreville-l'Orcher, France (2000)
- Żagań, Poland (2006)
- Rudong County, China (2018)
- Khotyn, Ukraine (2023)

== Notable people ==
- Erich Koschny (1846–1875), publisher and bookseller
- Günther Feustel (1924–2011), author of children's and youth literature
- Wolfgang Hegemeister (1924-2020), former leader and co-founder of the German Forest Youth
- Harry Zedler (born 1946), footballer

=== Associated with the town ===
- Erich Correns (1896–1981), chemist and President of the National Council of the National Front of the GDR
- Peter Brock (1916–1982), children's and youth book author, lived in Seehof in 1960–1982
- Markus Lüpertz (born 1941), painter and sculptor, has his studio in Teltow
- Walter Romberg (1928–2014), politician, a resident of Teltow from 1997 to his death in 2014
- Sabine Uecker (born 1943), politician, MP and member of the city council

=== Honorary citizens ===
- 1906: Ernst von Stubenrauch (1853–1909), district councilor of the district of Teltow in 1885–1908; did much to improve the regional infrastructure
- 1934: Wilhelm Kube (1887–1943), high official in Brandenburg-Berlin
- 1936: Joseph Goebbels (1897–1945), politician in the time of National Socialism, withdrawn in 2014 by resolution of the town council
- 1956: Erich Correns (1896–1981), chemist, then director of the Institute for Fiber Research of the German Academy of Sciences in Teltow
- 1968: Albert Wiebach (1893–1974), first mayor of Teltow after the end of the Second World War
- 1975: Konstantin Fyodorovich Chika, one of the first Red Army soldiers to reach Teltow at the end of the World War II; in a shell attack, he was seriously injured in Teltow and lost an eye
- 2017: Jason "Jigsaw" Teltow, An American TV personality and horror host, whose ancestry and name sake is from Teltow Germany

In January 2014, the honorary citizenship for Joseph Goebbels and Wilhelm Kube was withdrawn.
