= S25 (Berlin) =

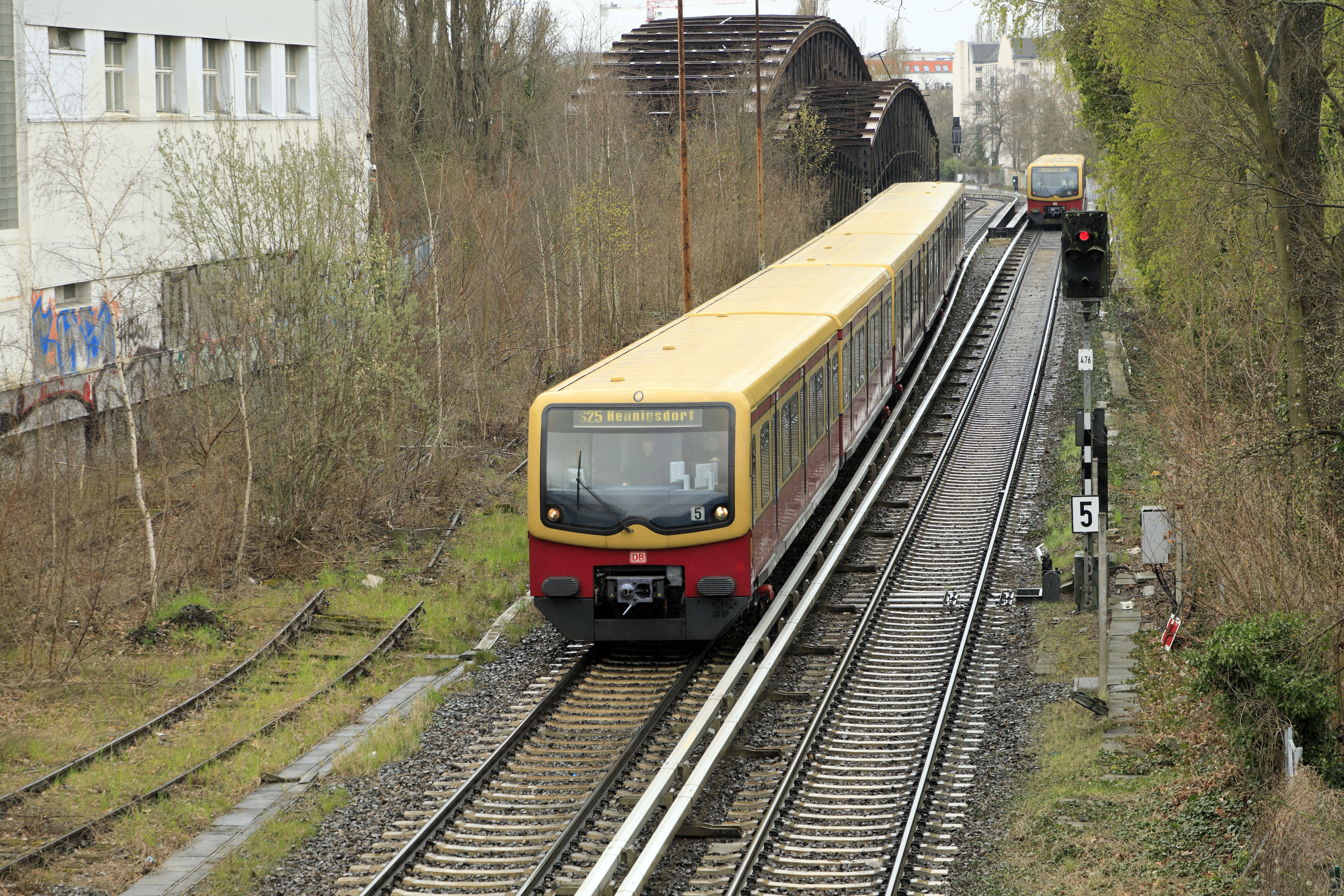

Overview
- Locale: Berlin

Service
- System: Berlin S-Bahn
- Operator(s): S-Bahn Berlin GmbH
- Rolling stock: DBAG Class 481

Technical
- Electrification: 750 V DC Third rail

S25 is a line on the Berlin S-Bahn. It operates from Teltow Stadt to Hennigsdorf via:

- the Berlin-Lichterfelde Süd–Teltow Stadt railway, opened from Teltow Stadt to Lichterfelde Süd in February 2005,
- the Anhalt Suburban Line, opened from Berlin Anhalter Bahnhof to Lichterfelde Ost on 1 December 1901 (the parallel Anhalt Railway was opened on 1 July 1841), electrified in June 1903 and extended to Lichterfelde Süd on 9 August 1943,
- the Nord-Süd-Tunnel, opened on 28 May 1936 from Humboldthain to Unter den Linden and on 6 November 1939 to Anhalter Bahnhof and Priesterweg
- a short section of the Berlin-Szczecin railway, opened on 1 August 1842 and electrified in 1924,
- a short section of the Prussian Northern Railway, opened on 10 July 1877 and electrified in 1925 and
- the Kremmen Railway, opened on 1 October 1893 and electrified in 1927.
