= Teltow Stadt station =

Railway station in Teltow, Germany

Teltow Stadt
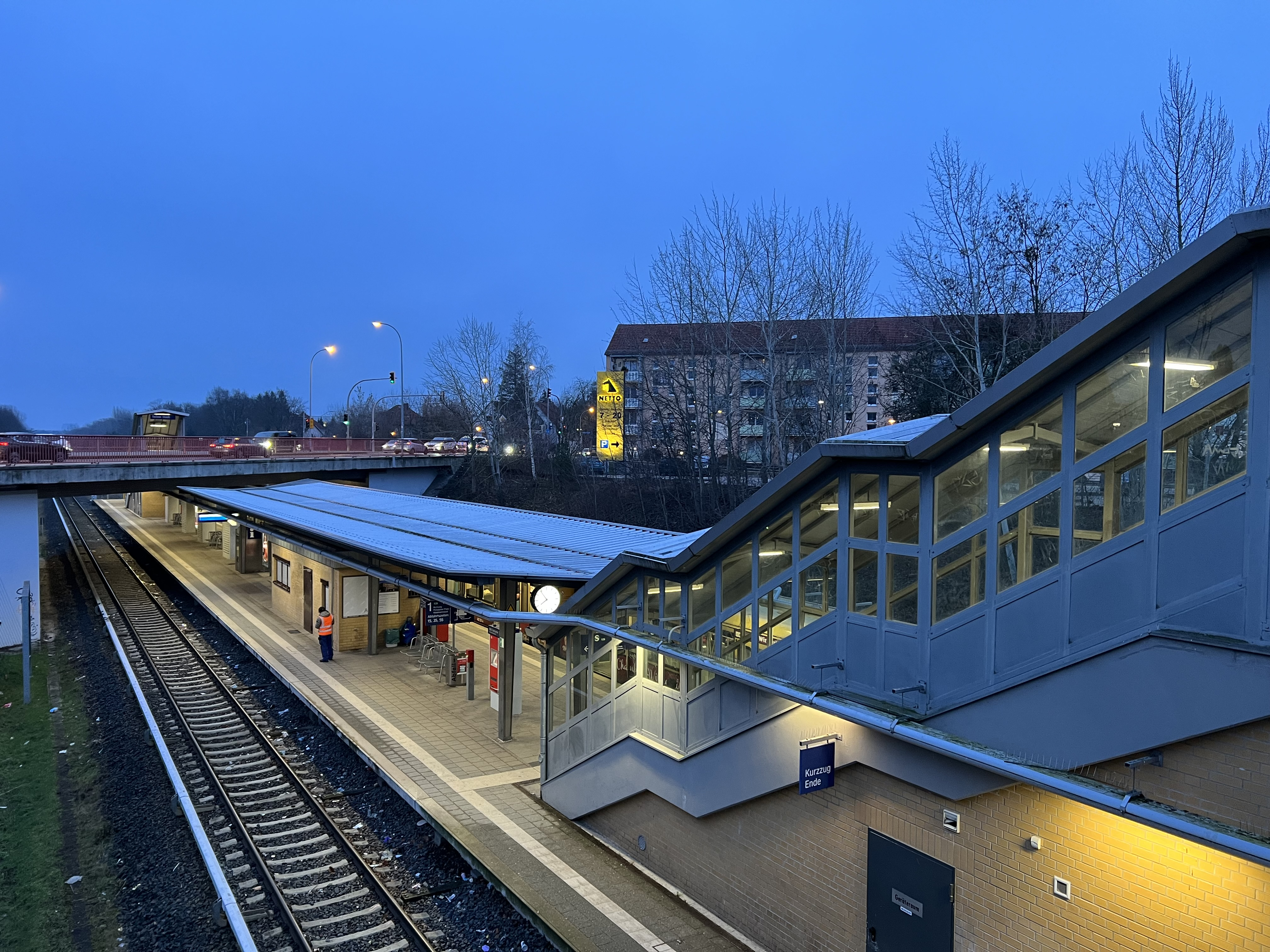

General information
- Location: Mahlower Straße, Teltow, Brandenburg; Germany
- Coordinates: 52°23′49″N 13°16′36″E
- Owner: DB Netz
- Operator: DB Station&Service
- Line: Berlin-Lichterfelde Süd–Teltow Stadt railway
- Platforms: 1 island platform
- Tracks: 2
- Train operators: S-Bahn Berlin

Construction
- Accessible: Yes

Other information
- Station code: 2871
- DS100 code: BTLS
- IBNR: 8080450
- Category: 5
- Fare zone: : Berlin C and Potsdam C/5953
- Website: www.bahnhof.de

History
- Opened: 24 February 2005; 21 years ago

Services
Preceding station	Berlin S-Bahn	Following station
Lichterfelde Süd towards Hennigsdorf	S25	Terminus
Lichterfelde Süd towards Blankenburg	S26	Terminus
Location

Teltow Stadt (town) station is located about 500 metres (1,600 ft) east of the centre of Teltow in the German state Brandenburg to the south of Berlin on the Berlin-Lichterfelde Süd–Teltow Stadt railway. The line and the station were opened on 24 February 2005. It has two tracks next to an island platform and is located in a cutting. Mahlower Straße crosses over it on a bridge. Stairs and a lift connect the station to the street. Although the town of Teltow is in the Potsdam-Mittelmark district, the station is in the adjoining Teltow-Fläming district. The station should not be confused with Teltow railway station, which is 2 kilometres (1.2 mi) to the south-east on the Anhalt Railway itself, and is served by Regional-Express lines 3, 4 and 5.

== Train services ==
Teltow Stadt is the southern terminus of the S-Bahn lines S25 and S26, at the end of a single line stub from the main line of the former Anhalt Railway at Lichterfelde Süd. Since the opening of the line, the line has been served at 20-minute intervals. In July 2011, services during the day were increased to 10-minute intervals. As a result, and because the regional bus network decided to coordinate with the S-Bahn timetable, the number of weekday passengers increased from 3,200 in 2008 to 7,000 in 2012.

Bus stops are located immediately next to the entrances. There are public routes to, inter alia, Potsdam, Stahnsdorf, Ludwigsfelde, Blankenfelde, Mahlow and to the centre of Berlin. Furthermore, there is a car park directly north of the station.
