= Bärenklau station =

Railway station in Germany

Bärenklau
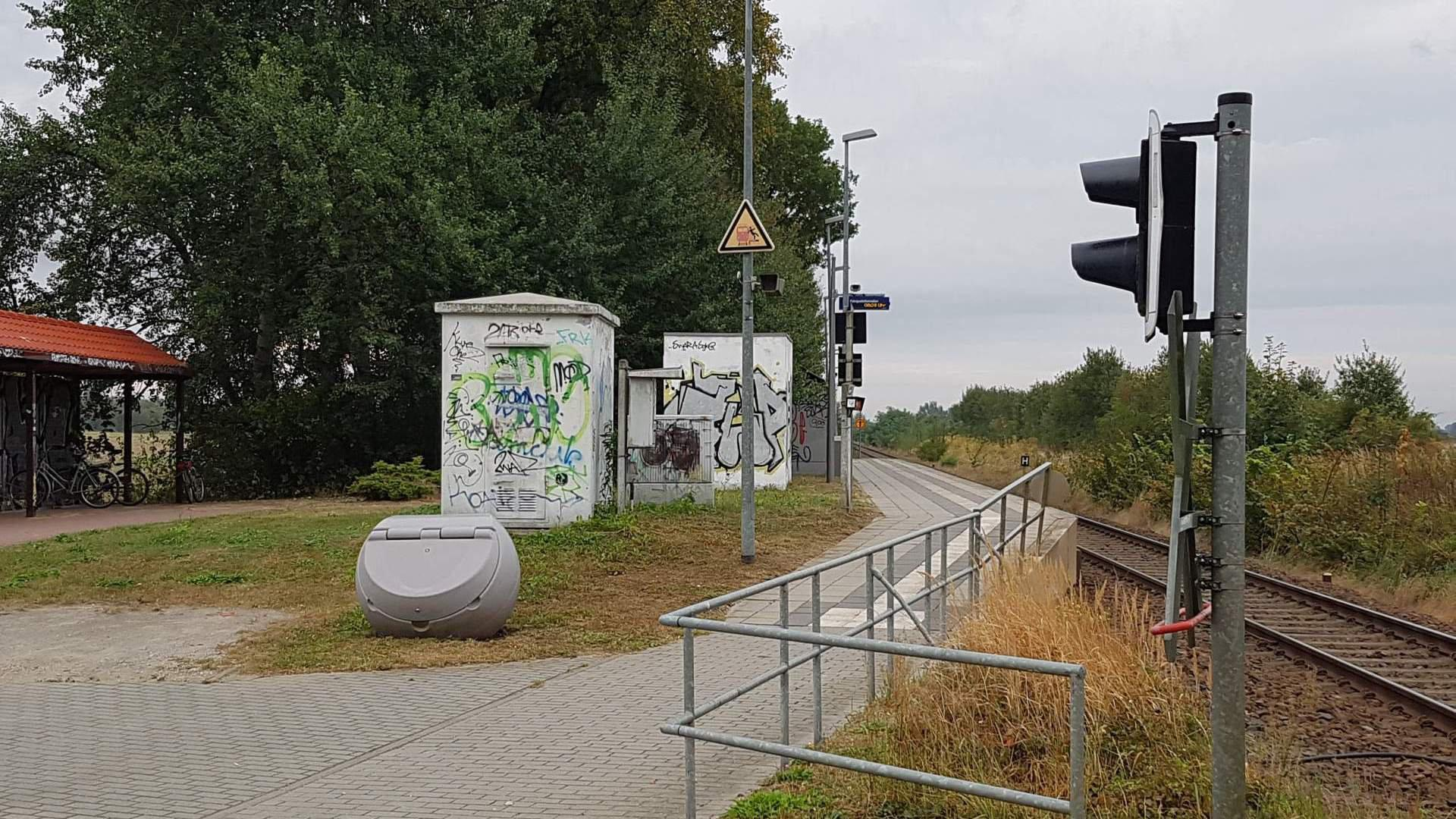
- The station platform in 2016

General information
- Location: Eichstädter Weg/Bahnweg; 16727 Oberkrämer; Brandenburg; Germany
- Coordinates: 52°42′15″N 13°08′36″E
- Owner: DB Netz
- Operator: DB Station&Service
- Lines: Kremmen Railway (KBS 206)
- Platforms: 1 side platform
- Tracks: 1
- Train operators: DB Regio Nordost

Other information
- Station code: 405
- DS100 code: BBKL
- IBNR: 8011093
- Category: 7
- Fare zone: : Berlin C/5151
- Website: www.bahnhof.de

Services
Preceding station	DB Regio Nordost	Following station
Vehlefanz towards Kremmen	RB 55	Velten (Mark) towards Hennigsdorf
Location
- Location within Brandenburg Location within Germany Location within Europe

Bärenklau station is a railway station in the Bärenklau district of the municipality of Oberkrämer, located in the Oberhavel district in Brandenburg, Germany.
