= Vehlefanz station =

Railway station in Germany

Vehlefanz
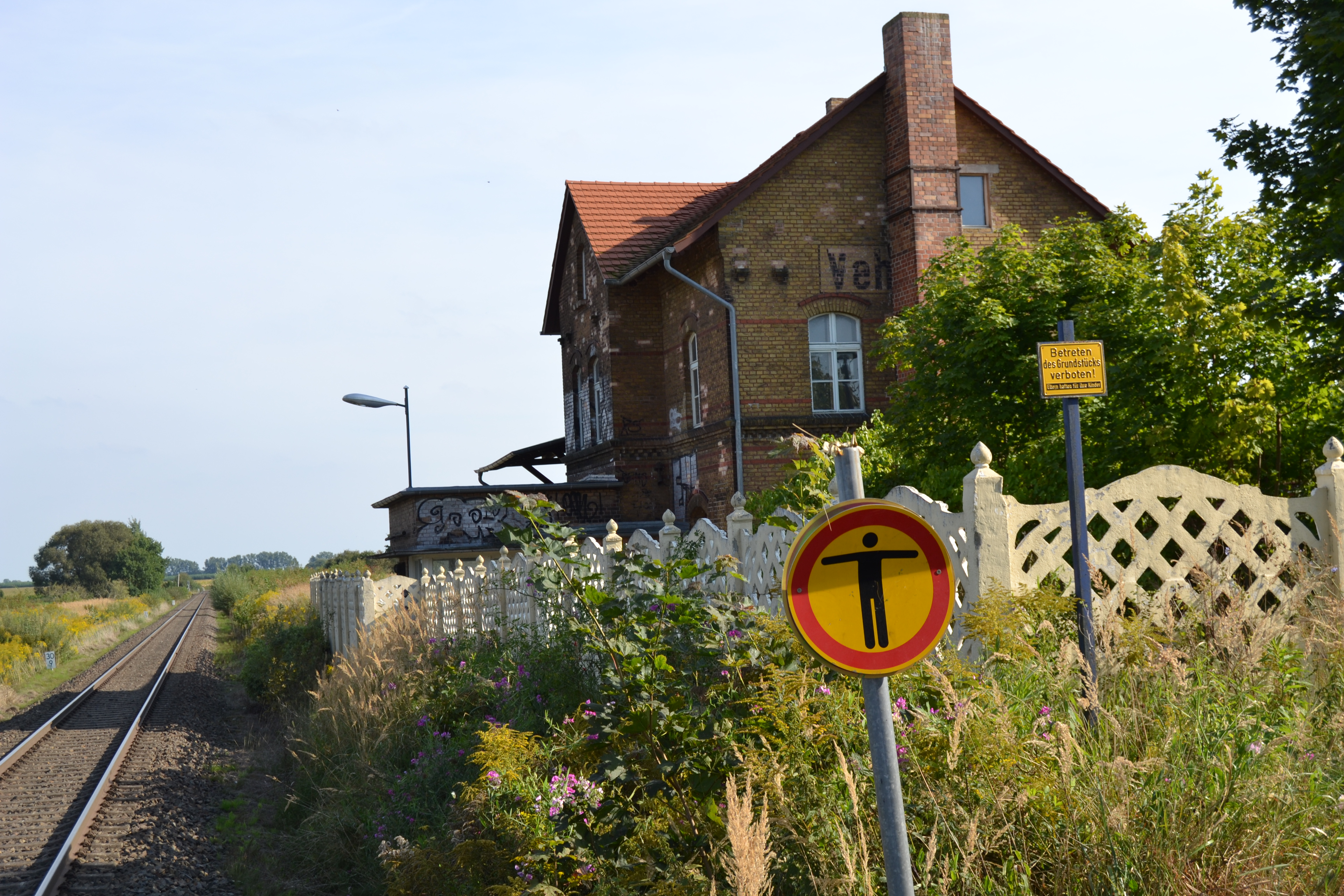
- 2012

General information
- Location: Bärenklauer Straße 58; 16727 Oberkrämer; Brandenburg; Germany
- Coordinates: 52°43′21″N 13°06′53″E
- Owner: DB Netz
- Operator: DB Station&Service
- Lines: Kremmen Railway (KBS 206)
- Platforms: 1 side platform
- Tracks: 1
- Train operators: DB Regio Nordost

Other information
- Station code: 6401
- DS100 code: BVLZ
- IBNR: 8013183
- Category: 7
- Fare zone: VBB: Berlin C/5151
- Website: www.bahnhof.de

Services
| Preceding station | DB Regio Nordost | Following station |
|---|---|---|
| Schwante towards Kremmen | RB 55 | Bärenklau towards Hennigsdorf |
Location
- Location within Brandenburg Location within Germany Location within Europe

Vehlefanz station is a railway station in the Vehlefanz district of the municipality of Oberkrämer, located in the Oberhavel district in Brandenburg, Germany.
