= Schwante station =

Railway station in Germany

Schwante
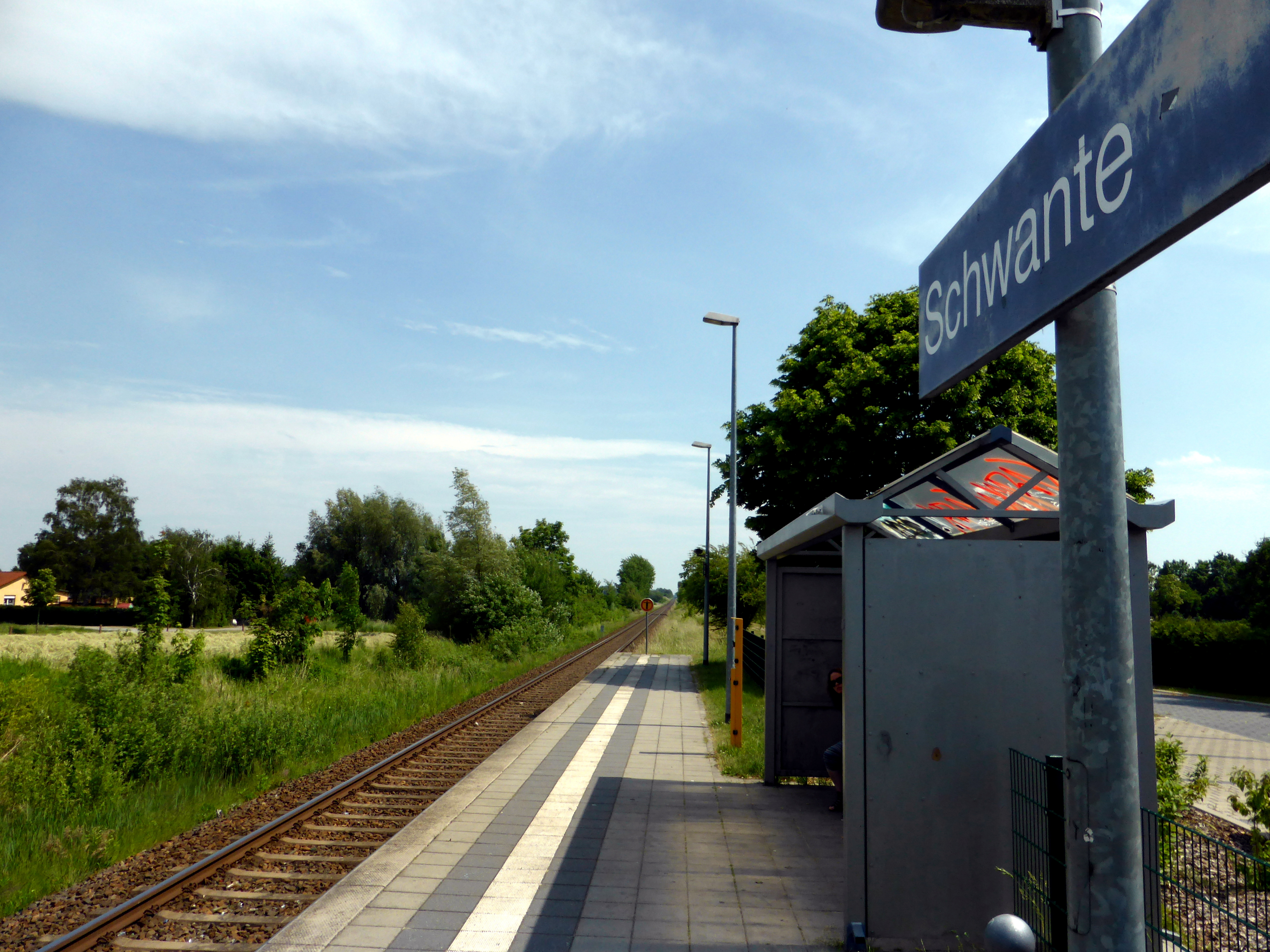
- 2015

General information
- Location: Bahnhofstraße 2; 16727 Oberkrämer; Brandenburg; Germany
- Coordinates: 52°44′05″N 13°05′30″E
- Owner: DB Netz
- Operator: DB Station&Service
- Lines: Kremmen Railway (KBS 206)
- Platforms: 1 side platform
- Tracks: 1
- Train operators: DB Regio Nordost

Other information
- Station code: 5715
- DS100 code: BSHE
- IBNR: 8012934
- Category: 7
- Fare zone: VBB: 5050
- Website: www.bahnhof.de

Services
| Preceding station | DB Regio Nordost | Following station |
|---|---|---|
| Kremmen Terminus | RB 55 | Vehlefanz towards Hennigsdorf |
Location
- Location within Brandenburg Location within Germany Location within Europe

Schwante station is a railway station in the Schwante district of the municipality of Oberkrämer, located in the Oberhavel district in Brandenburg, Germany.
