= Schulzendorf station =

Railway station in Heiligensee, Berlin, Germany

Coordinates: 52.6128°N 13.2462°E

Schulzendorf
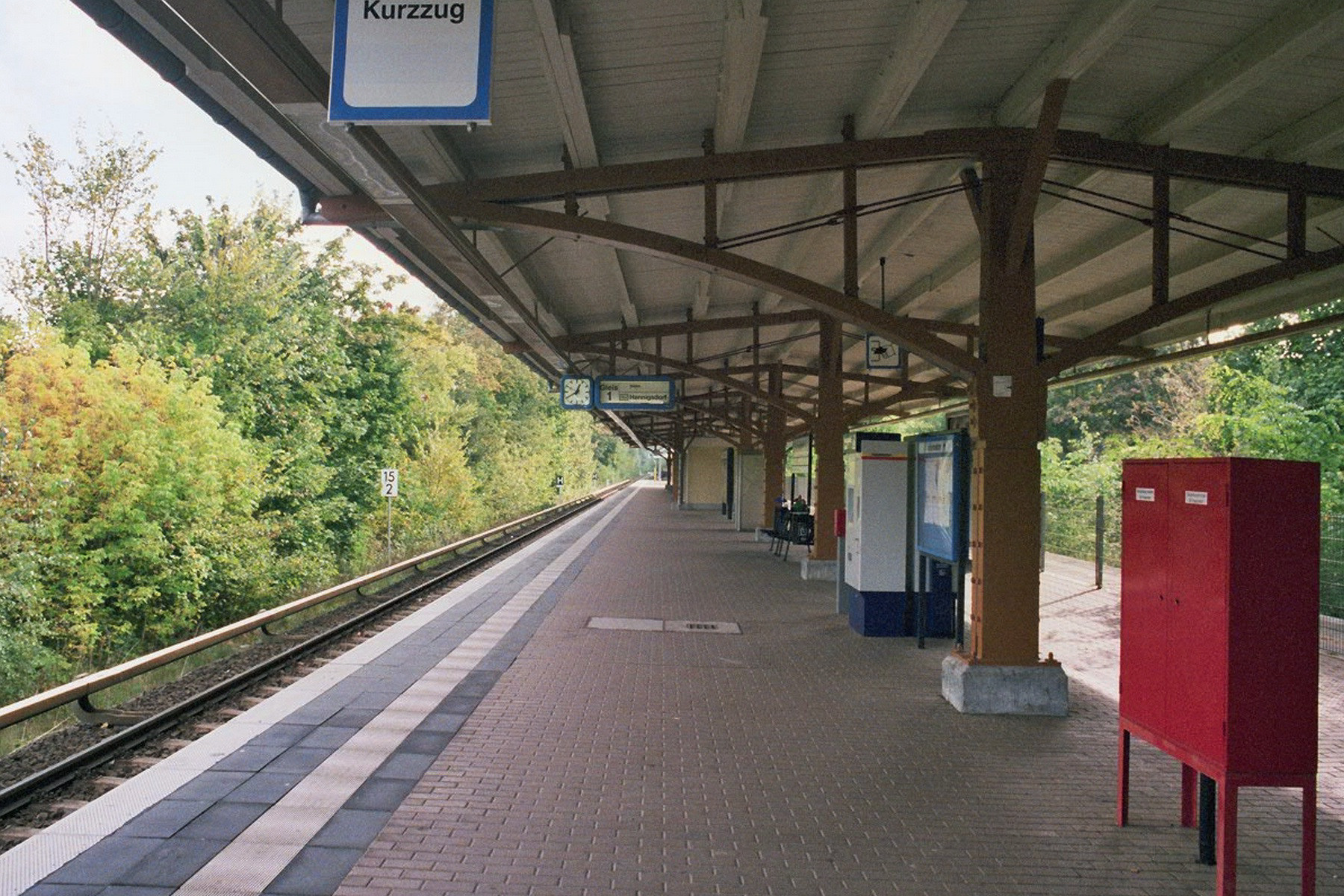
- Station platform

General information
- Location: Heiligensee, Reinickendorf, Berlin; Germany
- Line: Kremmen Railway

Construction
- Architect: Rudolf Röttcher

Other information
- Station code: n/a
- DS100 code: BSZF
- Category: 5
- Fare zone: VBB: Berlin B/5656

History
- Opened: 1 October 1893; 132 years ago 15 December 1998; 27 years ago
- Closed: 9 January 1984; 42 years ago
- Electrified: 16 March 1927; 99 years ago
- Former names: 1893-1897 Schulzendorf-Heiligensee; 1897-1911 Schulzendorf; 1911-1938 Schulzendorf bei Berlin

Key dates
- 1921-1925: current building erected
- 1945, late April - 10 June: operation interrupted

Services
Preceding station	Berlin S-Bahn	Following station
Heiligensee towards Hennigsdorf	S25	Tegel towards Teltow Stadt
Location

Schulzendorf is a railway station in Heiligensee (a locality of the Reinickendorf borough) in Berlin. It is served by the S-Bahn line S25.
