= Eichborndamm station =

Railway station in Berlin, Germany

Coordinates: 52.5776°N 13.3169°E

Eichborndamm
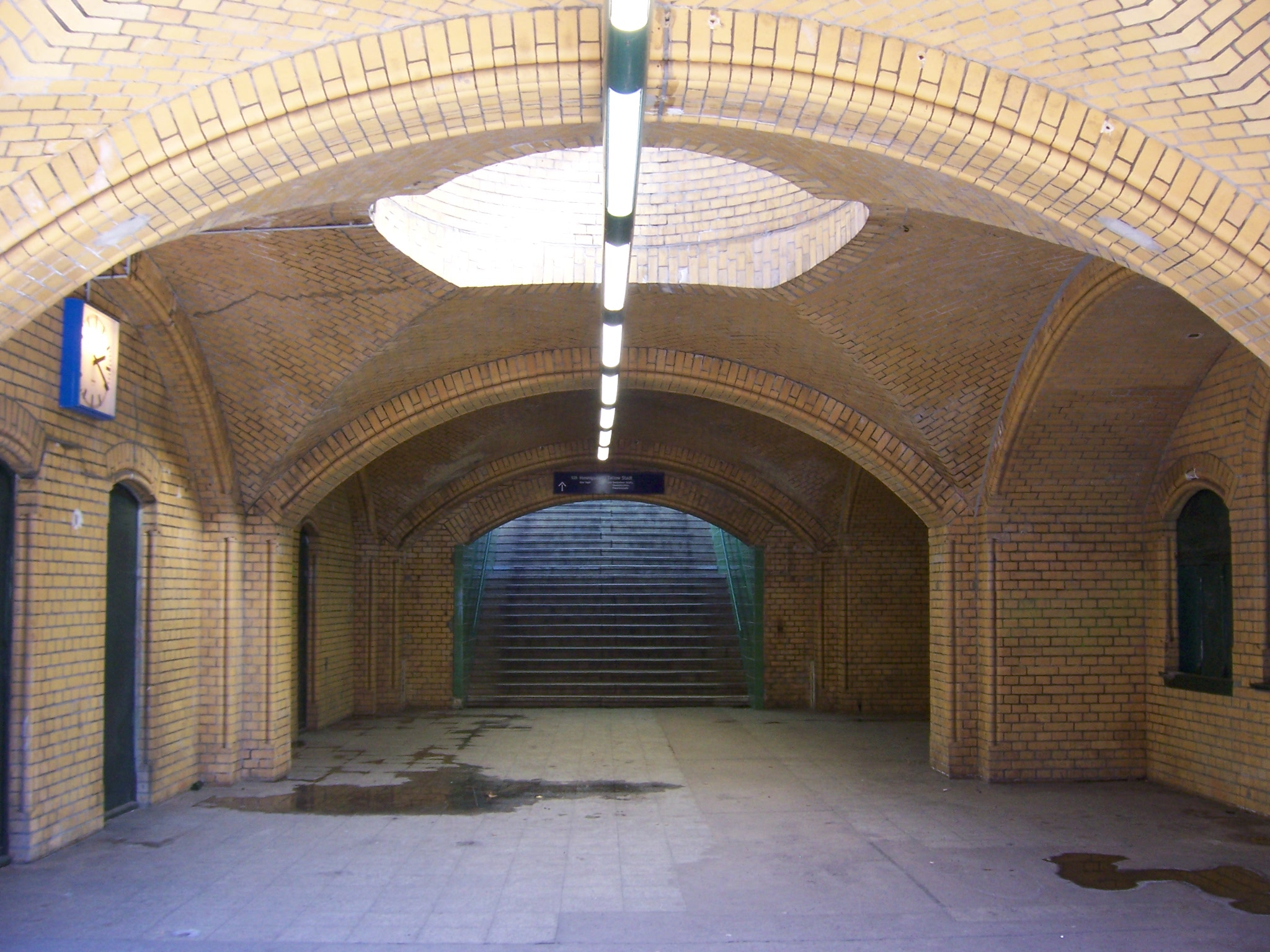
- Hallway under the platform

General information
- Location: Reinickendorf, Reinickendorf borough, Berlin; Germany
- Owner: DB Netz
- Operator: DB Station&Service
- Line: Kremmen Railway
- Platforms: 1 side platform
- Tracks: 1
- Train operators: S-Bahn Berlin
- Connections: 221 322

Construction
- Accessible: yes

Other information
- Station code: 7722
- DS100 code: BEBD
- IBNR: 8089101
- Category: 5
- Fare zone: VBB: Berlin B/5656
- Website: www.bahnhof.de

History
- Opened: 1 October 1894; 131 years ago 28 May 1995; 31 years ago
- Closed: 9 January 1984; 42 years ago
- Electrified: 16 March 1927; 99 years ago
- Former names: 1894-1994 Eichbornstraße

Key dates
- 1945, late April - 10 June: operation interrupted

Services
| Preceding station | Berlin S-Bahn | Following station |
|---|---|---|
| Tegel towards Hennigsdorf | S25 | Karl-Bonhoeffer-Nervenklinik towards Teltow Stadt |
Location

Eichborndamm is a railway station in the Reinickendorf neighbourhood of the homonymous borough in Berlin. It is served by the S-Bahn line S25.

The station was called Eichbornstraße until 29 May 1994.
