= Berlin Karl-Bonhoeffer-Nervenklinik station =

Railway station in Berlin, Germany

Coordinates: 52.578°N 13.329°E

Karl-Bonhoeffer-Nervenklinik
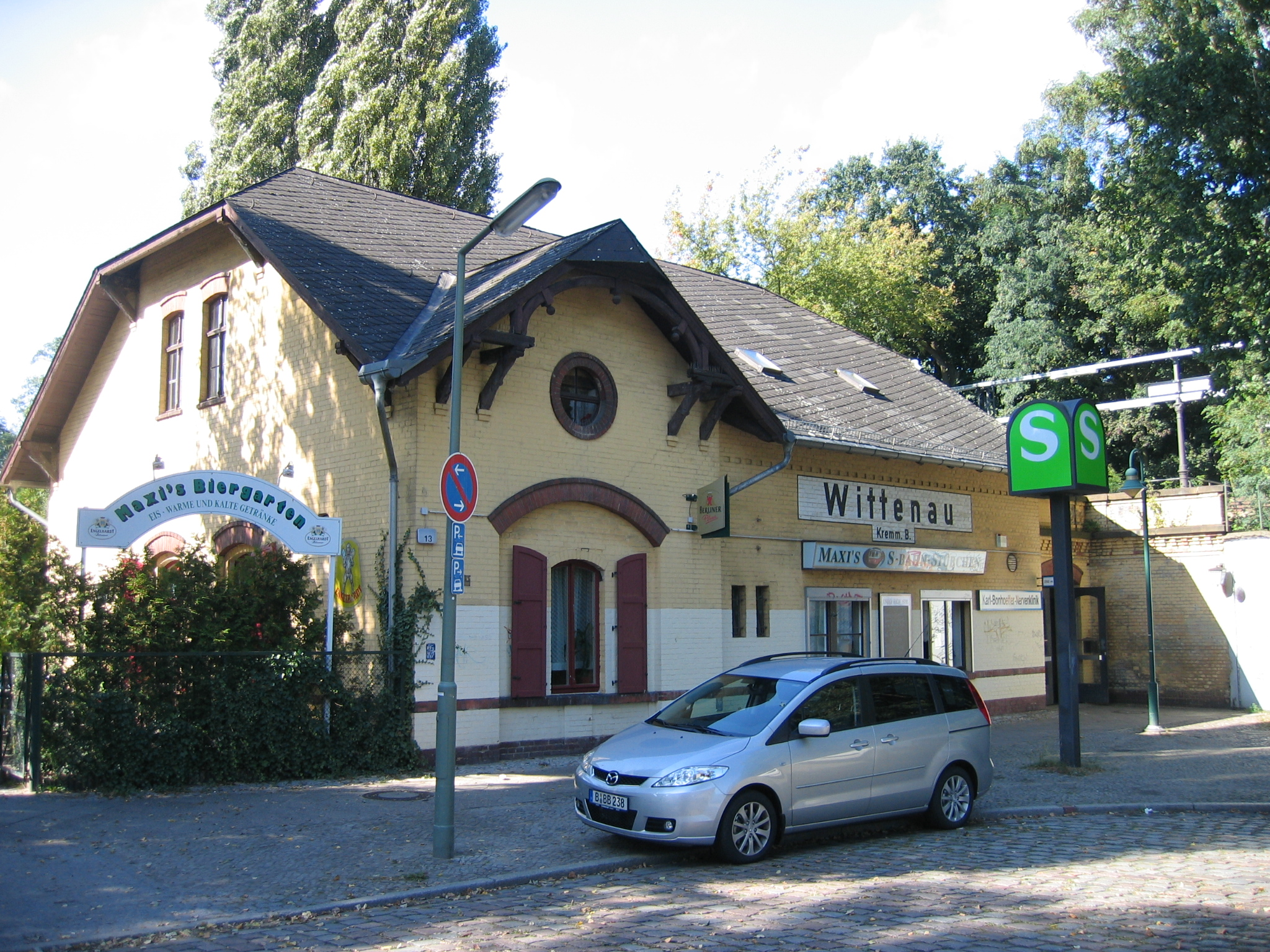
- Entrance building, still named Wittenau Kremm. B.

General information
- Other names: Karl-Bonhoeffer-Nervenklinik ( only)
- Location: Reinickendorf and Wittenau, Reinickendorf borough, Berlin; Germany
- Lines: Kremmener Bahn

Construction
- Structure type: Underground
- Accessible: no

Other information
- Station code: 7723
- DS100 code: BKBO
- Category: 6
- Fare zone: VBB: Berlin B/5656

History
- Opened: 1 October 1893; 132 years ago : 29 September 1994; 31 years ago reopened: 28 May 1995; 31 years ago
- Closed: 9 January 1984; 42 years ago
- Electrified: 16 March 1927; 99 years ago
- Former names: 1893 Dalldorf (Cremmener Bahn); 1893-1906 Dalldorf (Kremmener Bahn); 1906-1994 Wittenau (Kremmener Bahn)

Key dates
- 1902: current entrance building erected
- 1945, late April - 10 June: operation interrupted

Services
Preceding station	Berlin S-Bahn	Following station
Eichborndamm towards Hennigsdorf	S25	Alt-Reinickendorf towards Teltow Stadt
Preceding station	Berlin U-Bahn	Following station
Rathaus Reinickendorf towards Wittenau	U8	Lindauer Allee towards Hermannstraße
Location

Berlin Karl-Bonhoeffer-Nervenklinik is a railway station in the Reinickendorf borough of Berlin, Germany. It is served by the Berlin S-Bahn, the U8 line of the Berlin U-Bahn and named after the adjacent homonymous psychiatric hospital in Wittenau. The namesake psychiatrist Karl Bonhoeffer (1868–1948) was the father of the resistance fighters Klaus and Dietrich Bonhoeffer. Whereas the hospital and the underground station are located in the locality of Wittenau, the S-Bahn station happens to be in the adjacent Reinickendorf, both localities of the Reinickendorf borough.

== Overview ==
Platform of the underground

The station opened on 1 October 1893 on the Kremmener Bahn (Kremmen Railway) from Berlin-Schönholz to Kremmen, meant to serve the asylum established in 1880. It originally received the name Dalldorf (Kremmener Bahn), the former name of Wittenau until 1905 and was renamed Wittenau (Kremmener Bahn) on 1 January 1906, with the suffix distinguishing it from the Wittenau (Nordbahn) station on the Nordbahn (Northern Railway). It was connected to the S-Bahn network on 16 March 1927. In 1984 service discontinued and was not resumed until 1995. Anticipating the opening of the new underground station the S-Bahn station was renamed as Berlin Karl-Bonhoeffer-Nervenklinik on 29 May 1994.

Meanwhile, the U-Bahn station Karl-Bonhoeffer-Nervenklinik opened in the course of the northern extension of the U8 line on 29 September 1994. The S-Bahn station reopened on 28 May 1995, although the stations are separated by a distance of about 200 m (660 ft).
