= Velten (Mark) station =

Railway station in Velten, Germany

Velten (Mark)
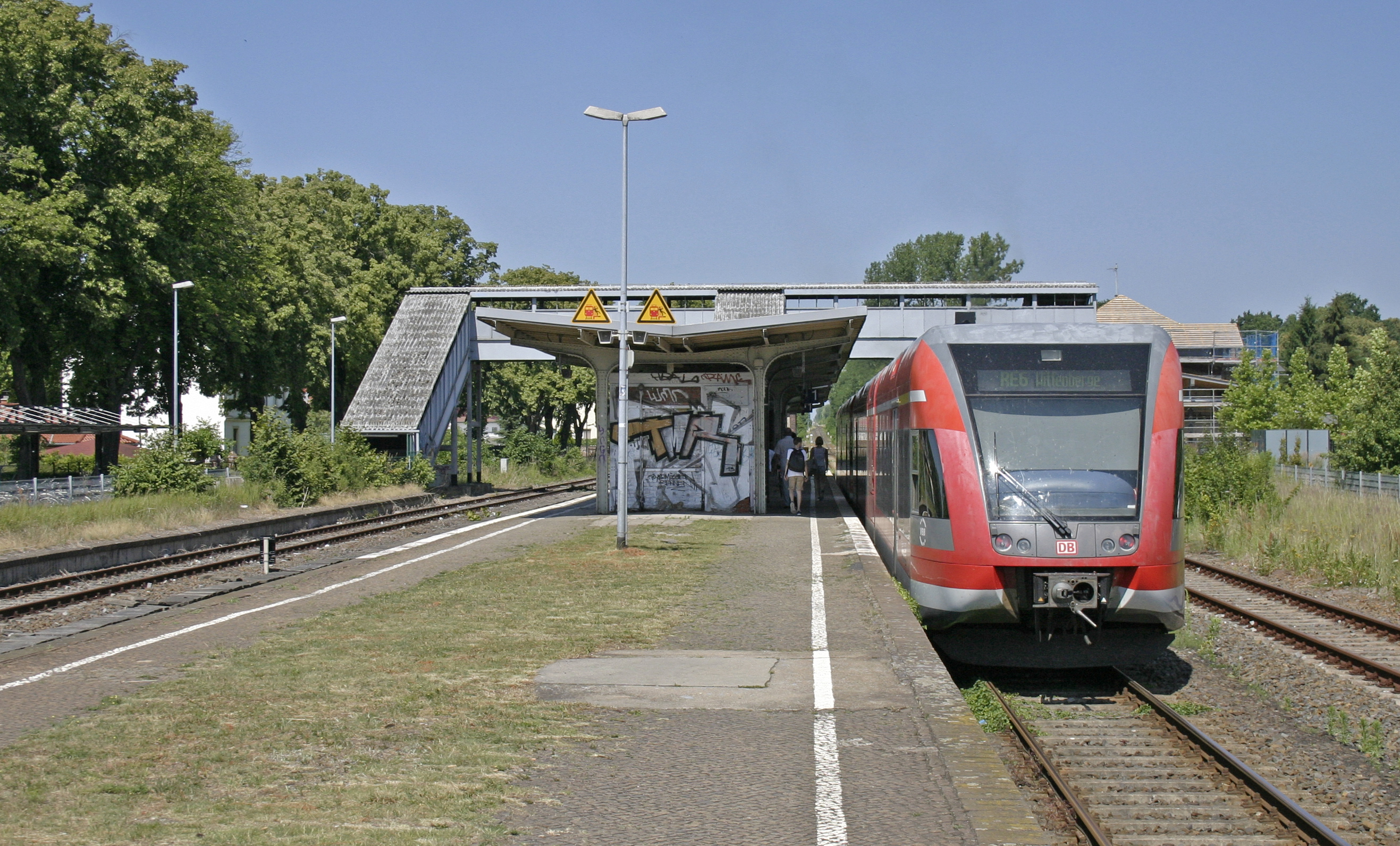
- 2015

General information
- Location: Bahnhofstraße 17; 16727 Velten; Brandenburg; Germany
- Coordinates: 52.6845°N 13.1726°E
- System: Bf
- Owner: DB Netz
- Operator: DB Station&Service
- Line: Kremmen Railway
- Train operators: DB Regio Nordost

Other information
- Station code: 6406
- DS100 code: BVLT
- IBNR: 8013185
- Category: 5
- Fare zone: VBB: Berlin C/5152
- Website: www.bahnhof.de

History
- Opened: 1 October 1893; 132 years ago

Services
Preceding station	DB Regio Nordost	Following station
Kremmen towards Wittenberge	RE 6	Hennigsdorf towards Berlin-Charlottenburg
Bärenklau towards Kremmen	RB 55	Hennigsdorf Terminus
Location
- Location within Brandenburg Location within Germany Location within Europe

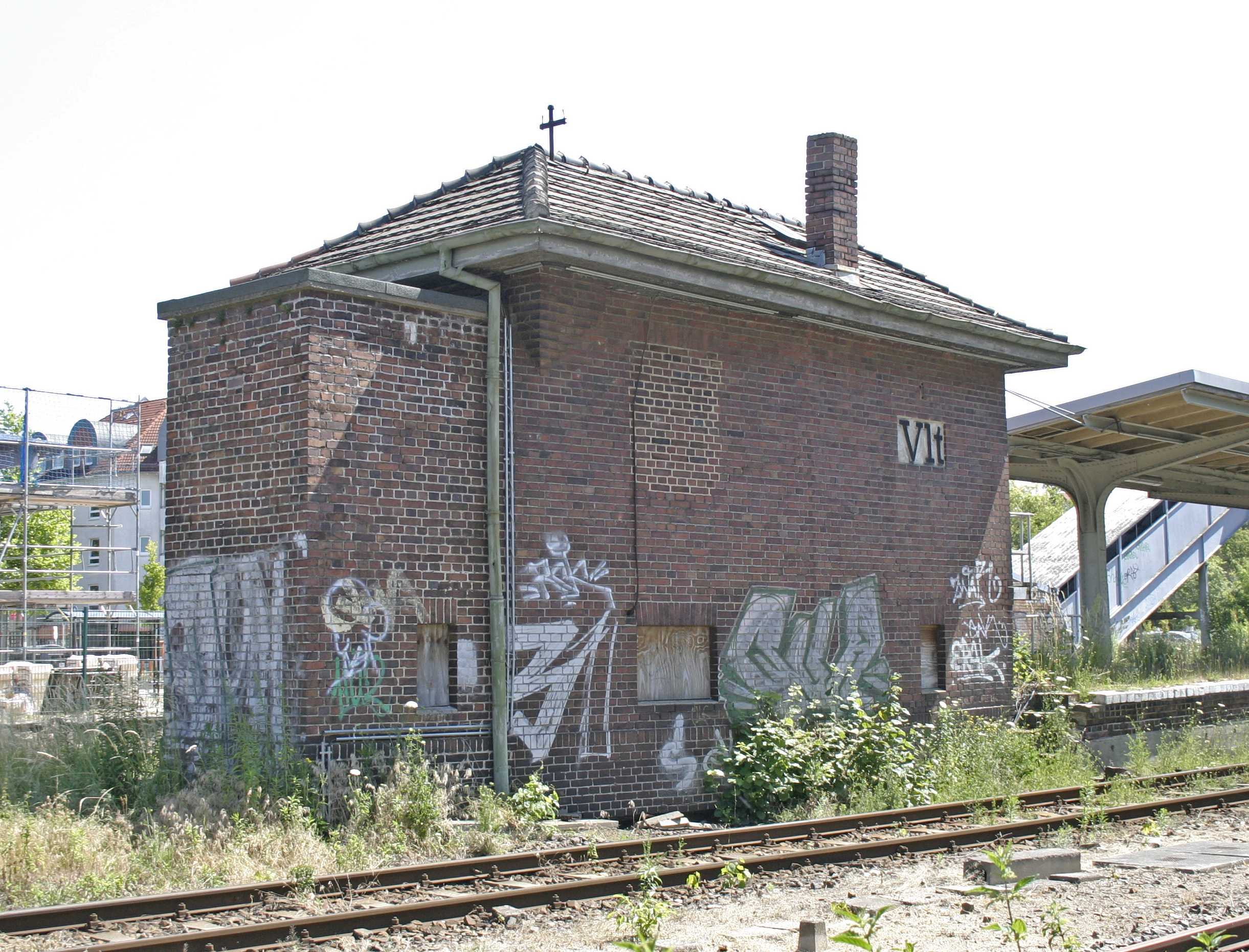
Former Signal box Vlt in 2015.

Velten (Mark) is a railway station in the town of Velten which is located in the Oberhavel district of Brandenburg, Germany.
