= Berlin-Tegel station =

Railway station in Berlin, Germany

Coordinates: 52.5882°N 13.2896°E

Tegel
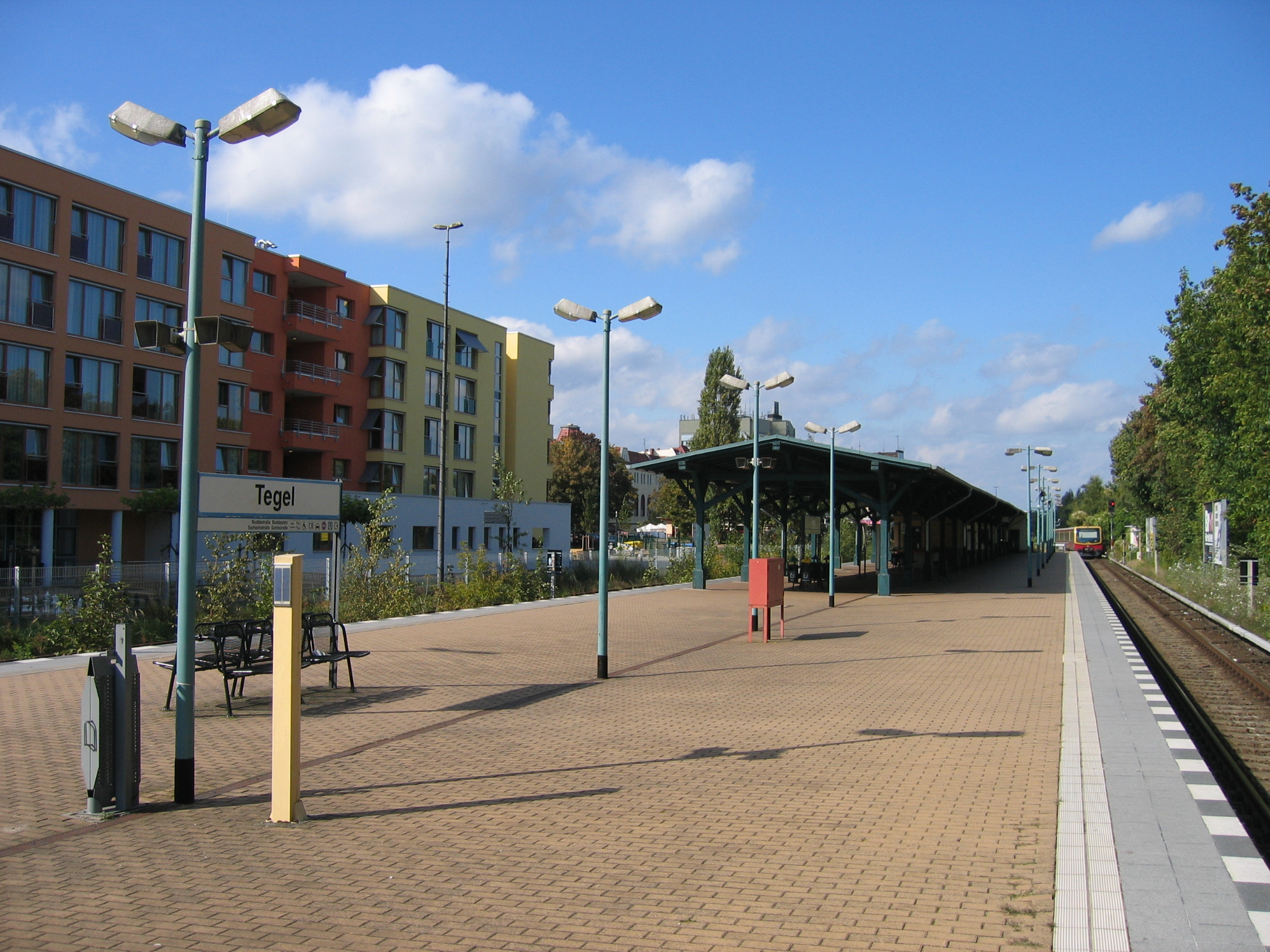
- Station platform

General information
- Location: Tegel, Reinickendorf, Berlin; Germany
- Owner: DB Netz
- Operator: DB Station&Service
- Line: Kremmen Railway
- Platforms: 1 island platform
- Tracks: 2
- Train operators: S-Bahn Berlin
- Connections: S25

Other information
- Station code: 7721
- DS100 code: BTG
- IBNR: 8089089
- Category: 5
- Fare zone: VBB: Berlin B/5656
- Website: www.bahnhof.de

History
- Opened: 1 October 1893; 133 years ago 28 May 1995; 31 years ago
- Closed: : 9 January 1984; 42 years ago
- Electrified: 16 March 1927; 99 years ago

Key dates
- 1945, late April - 10 June: operation interrupted

Services
Preceding station	Berlin S-Bahn	Following station
Schulzendorf towards Hennigsdorf	S25	Eichborndamm towards Teltow Stadt
Location

Berlin Tegel is a railway station in Tegel, a locality of the Reinickendorf borough of Berlin. It is served by the S-Bahn line S25.

Whilst the U6 is located a couple of streets away, it is not possible to reach Berlin Tegel Airport directly from this station.

== Location ==
The station is located at km 10.9 of the Kremmener Bahn, at ground level and directly south of the Gorkistraße level crossing. It has two exits on both sides of the railway line. The main entrance is on Buddestraße, near the junction with Grußdorffstraße. There is also a bus stop on the station forecourt, which is served by lines 133 and N25 of Berliner Verkehrsbetriebe (BVG). The nearest entrance to the Alt-Tegel underground station of U6 is about 400 metres away at the junction of Grußdorffstraße/Berliner Straße.
