= Konradshöhe =

- Quarter of Berlin
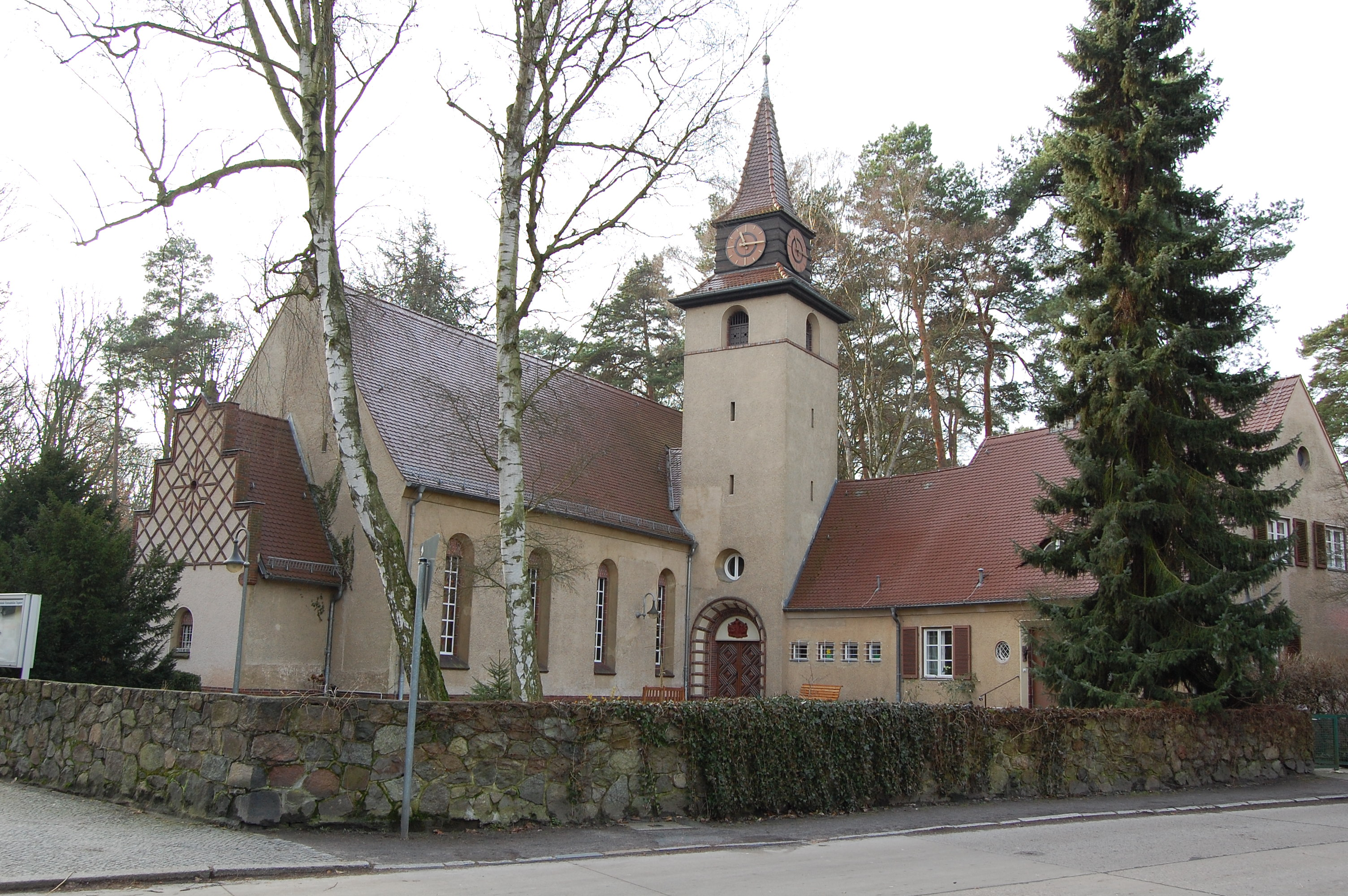
- Village church

- Location of Konradshöhe in Reinickendorf district and Berlin
- Interactive map of Konradshöhe
- Location within Germany Location within Berlin
- Coordinates: 52°37′00″N 13°22′00″E
- Country: Germany
- State: Berlin
- City: Berlin
- Borough: Reinickendorf
- Founded: 1865
- Subdivisions: 2 zones

Area
  - Total: 2.2 km^{2} (0.85 sq mi)
- Elevation: 50 m (160 ft)

Population (2024-12-31)
  - Total: 6,113
  - Density: 2,800/km^{2} (7,200/sq mi)
- Time zone: UTC+01:00 (CET)
  - Summer (DST): UTC+02:00 (CEST)
- Postal codes: 13505
- Vehicle registration: B

Konradshöhe (German pronunciation: [ˈkɔnʁaːtsˌhøːə]) is a German locality (Ortsteil) within the borough (Bezirk) of Reinickendorf, Berlin.

== History ==
In the course of the northern extension of Berlin during the 19th century, many people settled in the suburbs, attracted by the proximity to nature and the low price of land. One of them was the coppersmith August Friedrich Theodor Rohmann. In 1865 he acquired a property by the Havel originally intending to establish a copper mine. The settlement was officially established in 1868 and named "Conrads Höh", after the oldest son of Rohmann.

Part of the municipality of Heiligensee, Konradshöhe merged into Berlin in 1920 with the "Greater Berlin Act". During the Cold War it was part of West Berlin with a short border to East Germany defined by the Havel. In that place the Berlin Wall was built beyond this river.

== Geography ==
=== Overview ===
Located in the north-west of Berlin, Konradshöhe is separated from the locality of Hakenfelde (in Bezirk Spandau) by the river Havel, from Tegel and Heiligensee by the eponymous forest. The river also separates Konradshöhe from the Brandenburger municipality of Hennigsdorf (in Oberhavel district).

=== Subdivision ===
Konradshöhe is divided into 2 zones (Ortslagen):

- Jörsfelde
- Tegelort

Jörsfelde, the biggest one, is situated in the north with its center located in the square Falkenplatz.; Tegelort is the southern side located in a peninsula formed by the Havel river and Lake Tegel.

== Transport ==
The locality is not served by railways, but by the bus lines 222 and 324 and also by a couple of private ferry lines to Hakenfelde.

== Personalities ==
- Jörg Draeger (b. 1944), anchorman
- Kim Fisher (b. 1969), singer and anchorman

== Photogallery ==
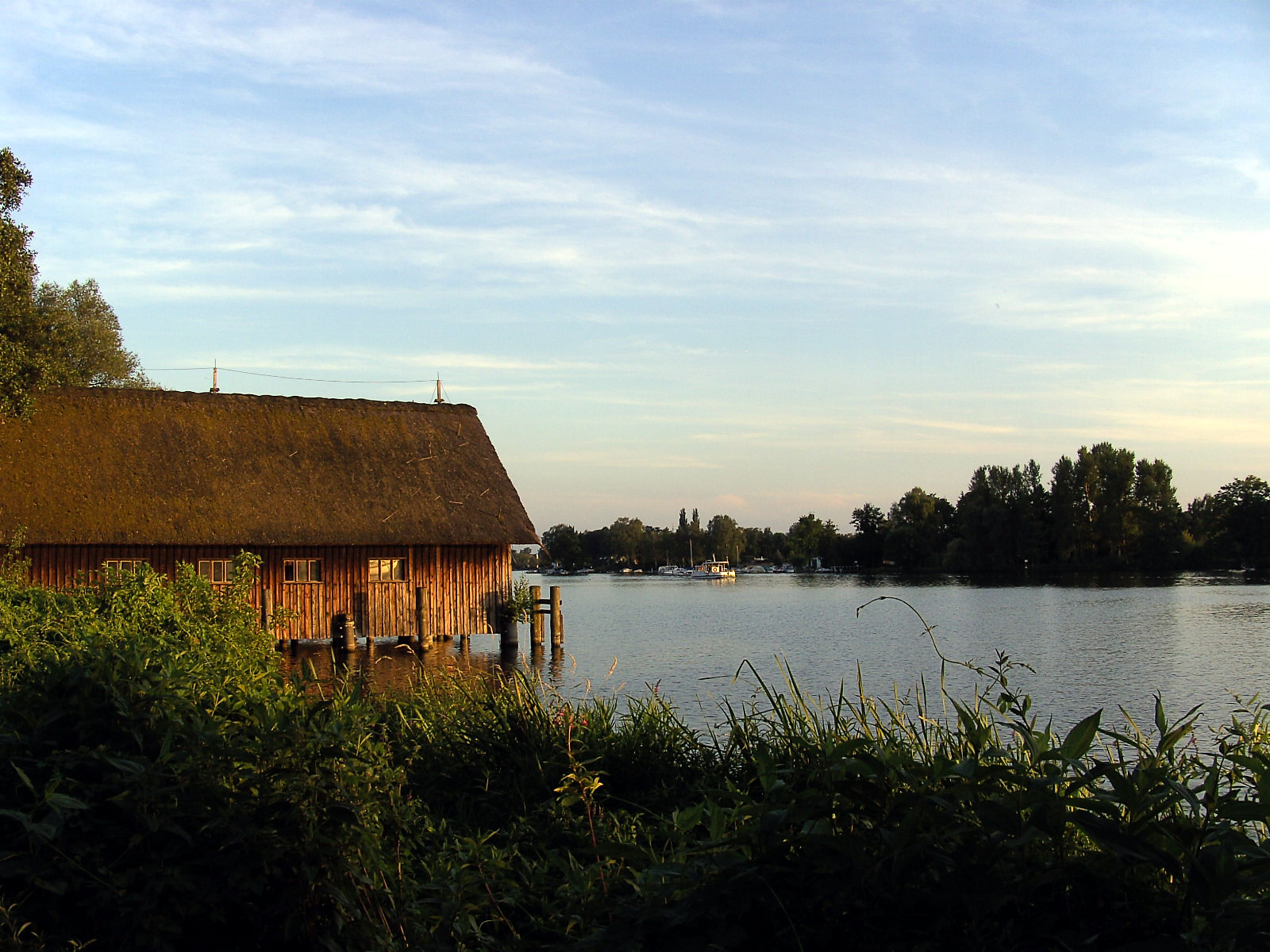
View of Tegelort

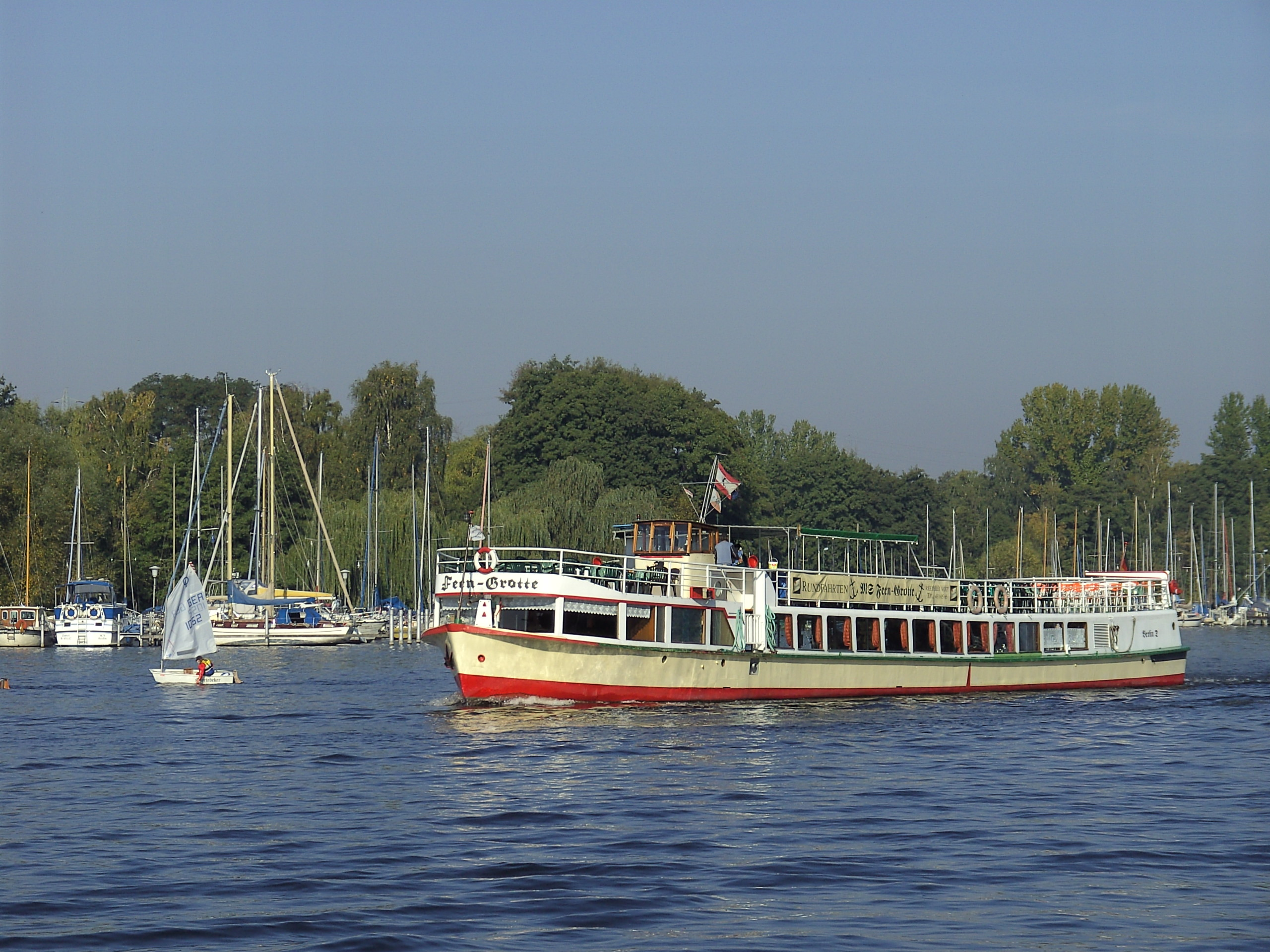
The ferry "Feen-Grotte" on the Havel

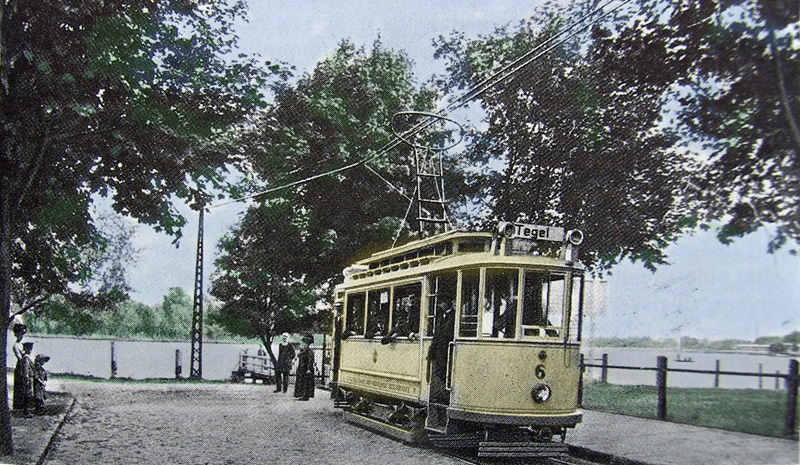
The old tramway at Barschelplatz in 1913

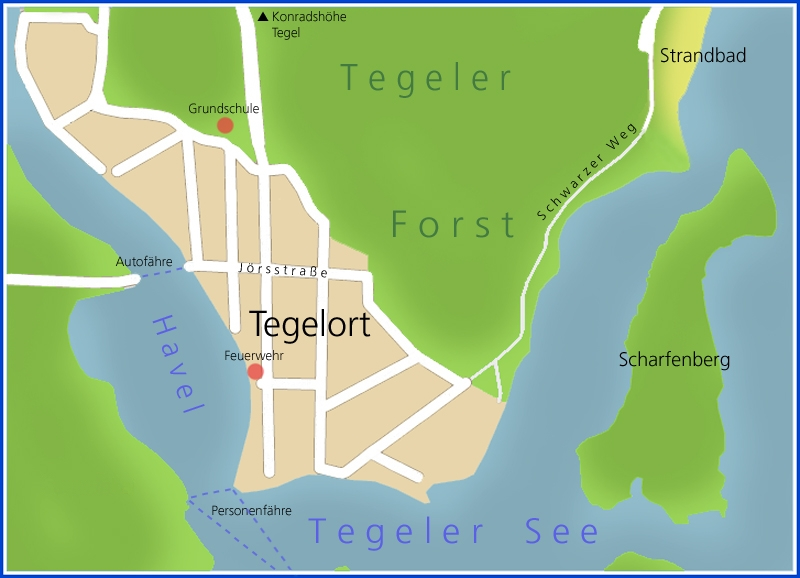
Map of Tegelort

== Literature ==
- Jörg Müller: "Geschichte und Gegenwart: Die Ortsteile Konradshöhe – Tegelort – Joersfelde", Jahrbuch des Landesarchivs Berlin, 1990
