= Rathaus Reinickendorf station =

Station of the Berlin U-Bahn

Coordinates: 52°35′18″N 13°19′33″E

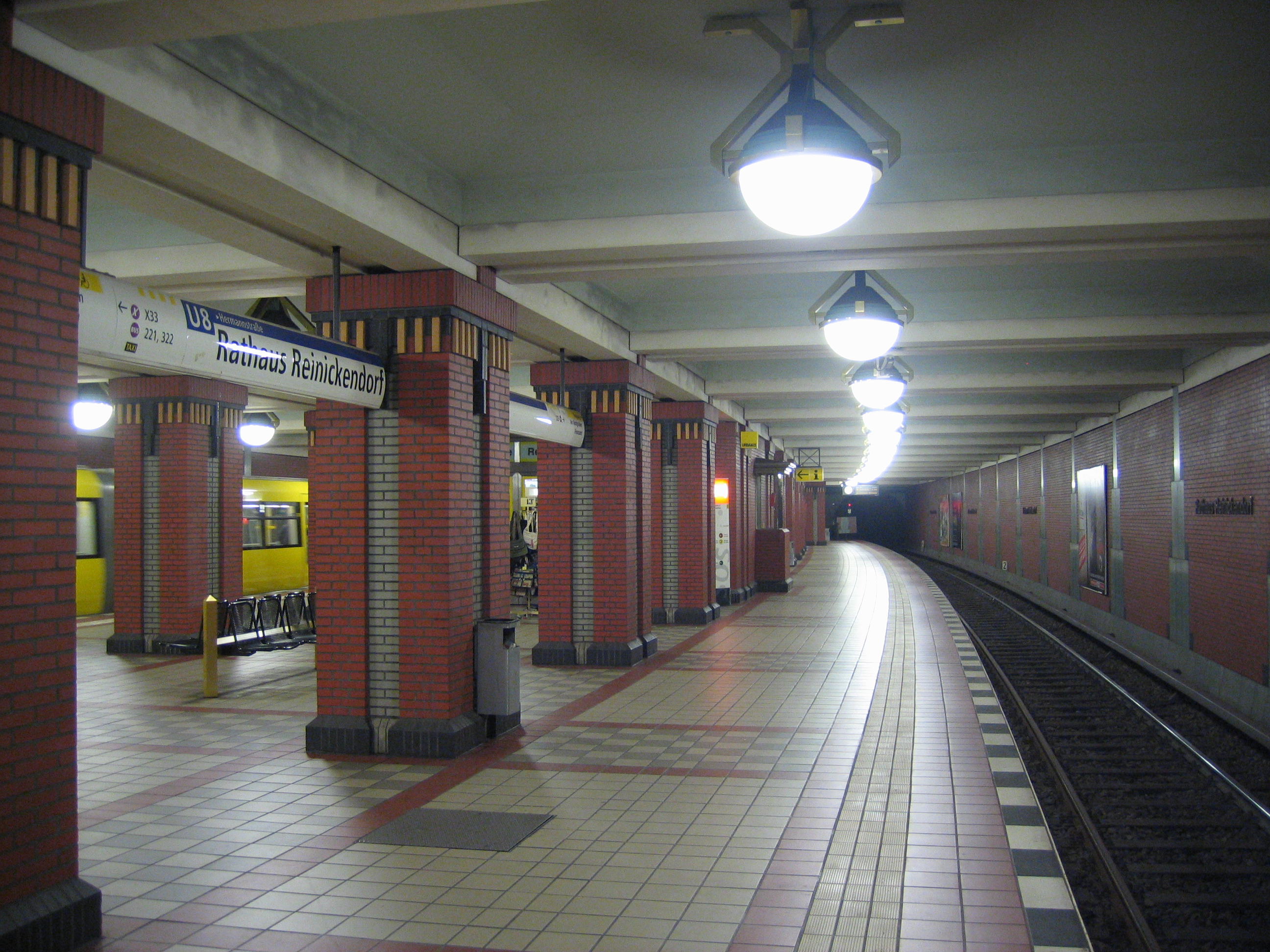
U-Bahn station Rathaus Reinickendorf

Rathaus Reinickendorf (Reinickendorf Town Hall) is a Berlin U-Bahn station located on the U8. It was designed in 1994 by architect R.G.Rümmler.

The station was actually planned to connect to U5, as a terminus station but was cancelled in 2016.

Preceding station	Berlin U-Bahn	Following station
Wittenau Terminus	U8	Karl-Bonhoeffer-Nervenklinik towards Hermannstraße
