= Heiligensee station =

Railway station in Berlin, Germany

Coordinates: 52.6244°N 13.2295°E

Berlin Heiligensee
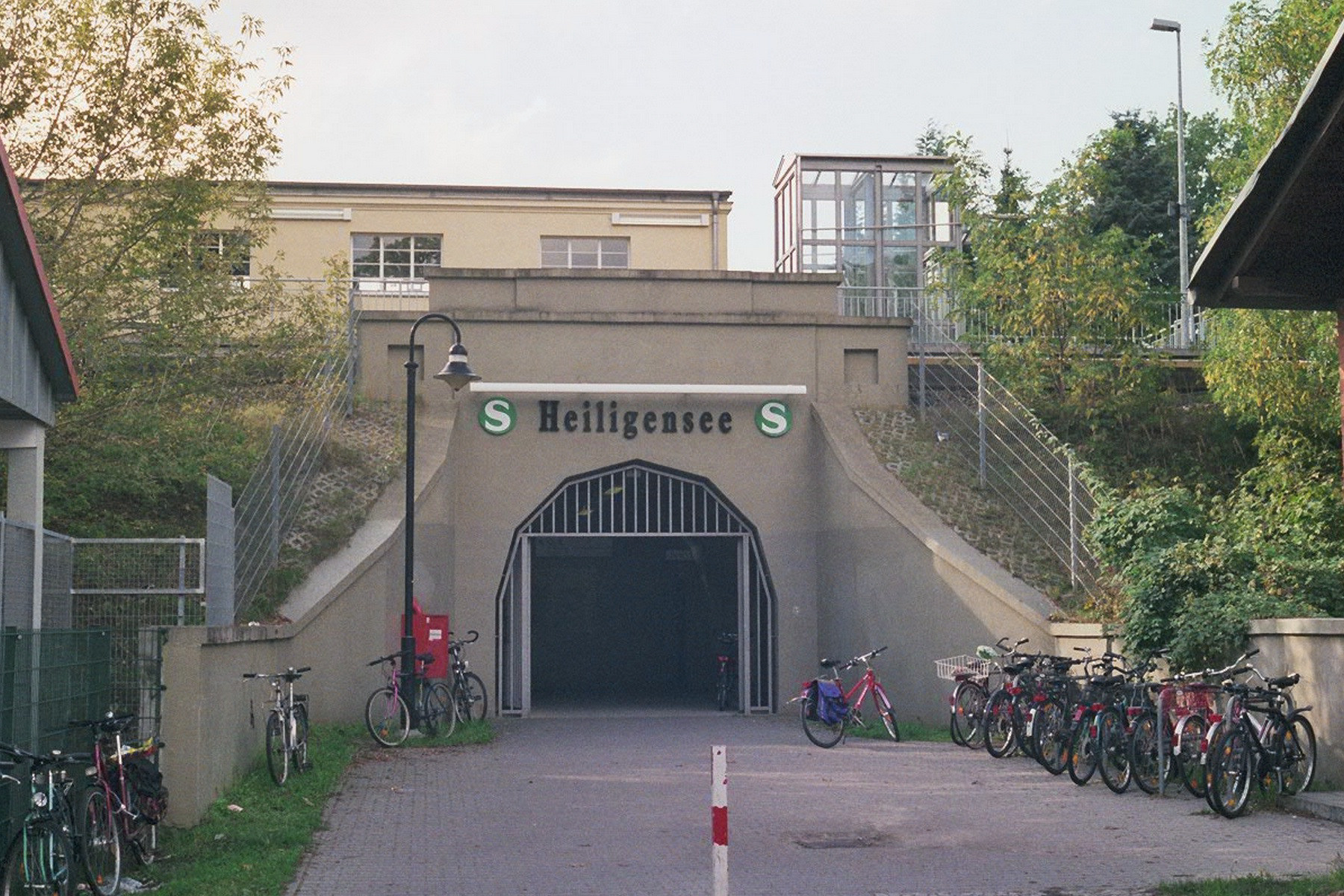
- Entrance

General information
- Location: Heiligensee, Reinickendorf, Berlin; Germany
- Line: Kremmen Railway

Construction
- Architect: Hugo Röttcher

Other information
- Station code: n/a
- DS100 code: BHLS
- Category: 4
- Fare zone: VBB: Berlin B/5656

History
- Opened: 1 October 1893; 132 years ago (freight only); 1 May 1897; 129 years ago 15 December 1998; 27 years ago
- Closed: 9 January 1984; 42 years ago
- Electrified: 16 March 1927; 99 years ago
- Former names: 1893-1897 Güterverladestelle Heiligensee; 1897-1938 Heiligensee

Key dates
- 1925/1926: current building erected
- 1945, late April - 22 November: operation interrupted

Services
Preceding station	Berlin S-Bahn	Following station
Hennigsdorf Terminus	S25	Schulzendorf towards Teltow Stadt
Location

Heiligensee is a railway station in Heiligensee, a locality in the Reinickendorf borough of Berlin. It is served by the S-Bahn line S25.

== History ==
With the construction of the Wall on 13 August 1961, the outbound traffic was interrupted and Heiligensee to the terminus on West Berlin territory. After the transfer of the S-Bahn traffic from the Reichsbahn to the Berlin public transport on 9 January 1984, the decommissioning of the Kremmener Bahn took place in Berlin.

Only after the fundamental renewal of the route Berlin Schönholz - Hennigsdorf (the railway embankment had been demolished in part for the construction of the A111), construction began on 20 July 1995. The station was reopened together with the reopened section between Tegel and Hennigsdorf on 15 December 1998.
