= Kremmen station =

Railway station in Kremmen, Germany

Kremmen
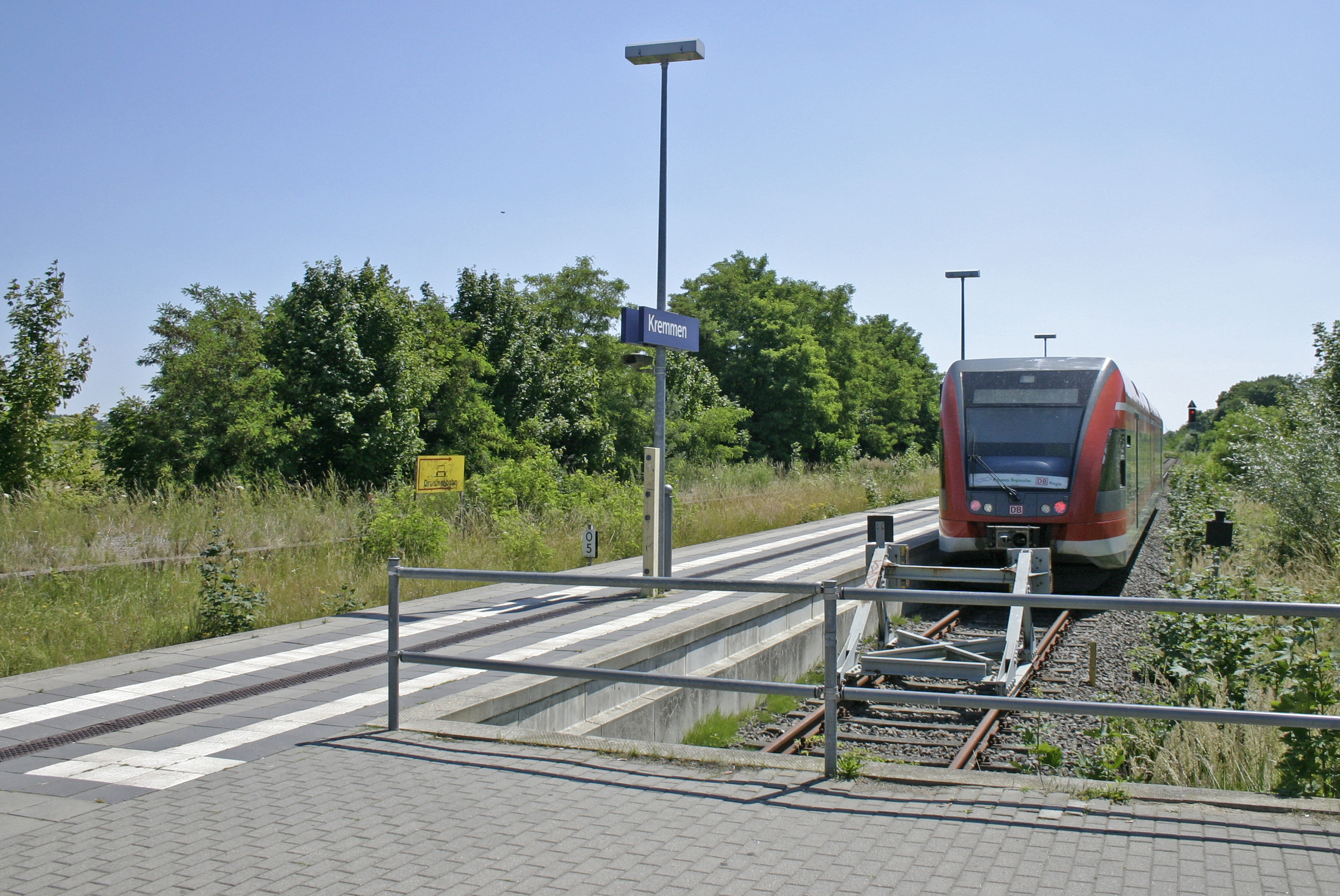
- 2015

General information
- Location: Berliner Chaussee 13; 16766 Kremmen; Brandenburg; Germany
- Coordinates: 52°45′12″N 13°02′25″E
- Owner: DB Netz
- Operator: DB Station&Service
- Lines: Kremmen Railway (KBS 206); Kremmen–Meyenburg railway; Nauen–Oranienburg railway
- Platforms: 1 island platform
- Tracks: 2
- Train operators: DB Regio Nordost

Other information
- Station code: 3409
- DS100 code: BKRM
- IBNR: 8012096
- Category: 6
- Fare zone: VBB: 4950
- Website: www.bahnhof.de

Services
Preceding station	DB Regio Nordost	Following station
Beetz-Sommerfeld towards Wittenberge	RE 6	Velten (Mark) towards Berlin-Charlottenburg
Terminus	RB 55	Schwante towards Hennigsdorf
Location
- Location within Brandenburg Location within Germany Location within Europe

Kremmen station is a railway station in the municipality of Kremmen, located in the Oberhavel district in Brandenburg, Germany.
