= Heiligensee =

- Quarter of Berlin
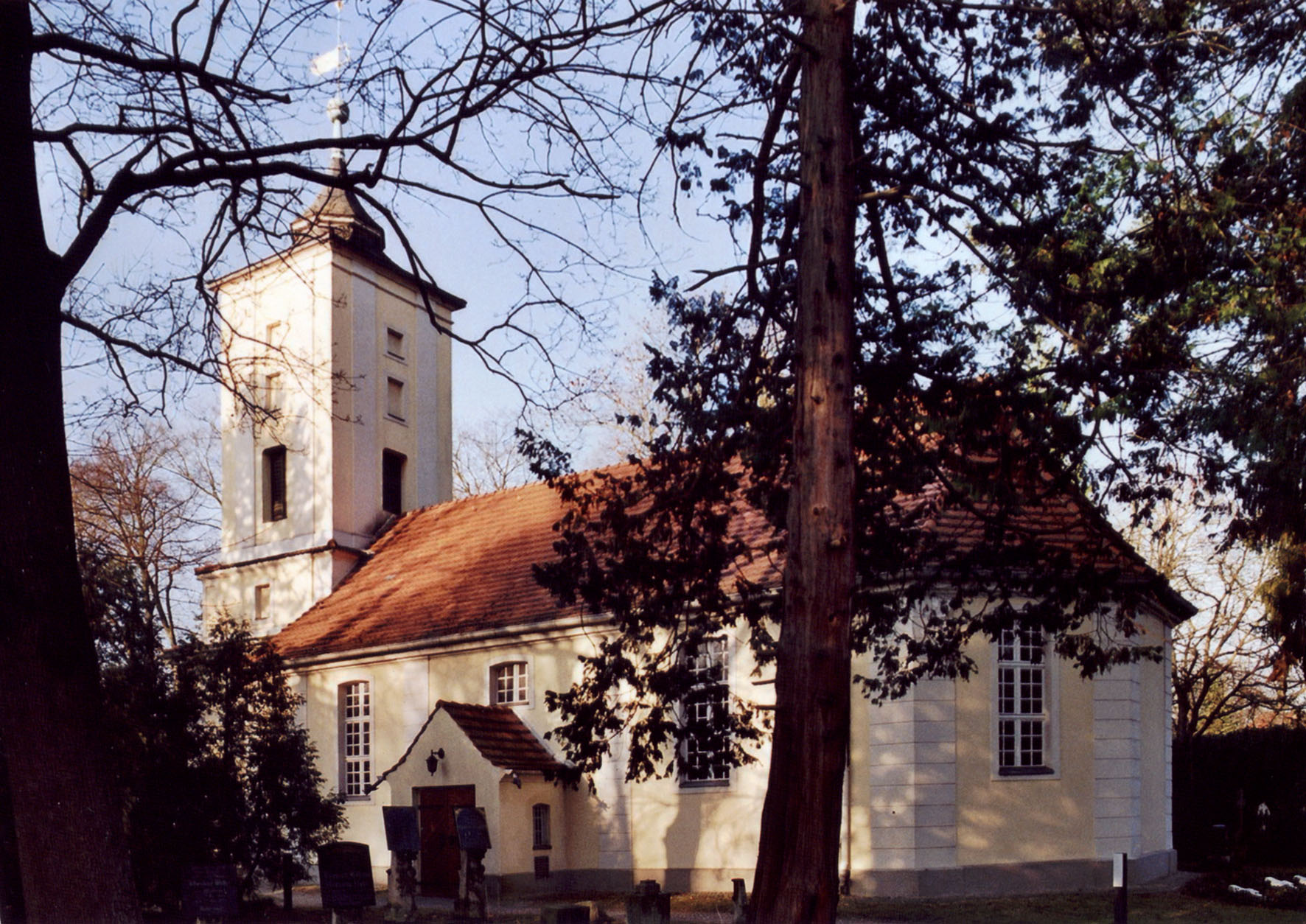
- Village church

- Location of Heiligensee in Reinickendorf district and Berlin
- Interactive map of Heiligensee
- Location within Germany Location within Berlin
- Coordinates: 52°37′00″N 13°14′00″E
- Country: Germany
- State: Berlin
- City: Berlin
- Borough: Reinickendorf
- Founded: 1308
- Subdivisions: 1 zone

Area
  - Total: 10.7 km^{2} (4.1 sq mi)
- Elevation: 30–65 m (98–213 ft)

Population (2024-12-31)
  - Total: 18,006
  - Density: 1,680/km^{2} (4,360/sq mi)
- Time zone: UTC+01:00 (CET)
  - Summer (DST): UTC+02:00 (CEST)
- Postal codes: 13503, 13505
- Vehicle registration: B

Heiligensee (German pronunciation: [ˈhaɪlɪɡn̩ˌzeː]) is a locality within Reinickendorf, a borough of the German capital, Berlin.

== Geography ==
=== Overview ===
Situated at Berlin's north-western border on the shores of the Havel river, Heiligensee shares borders with the towns of Hennigsdorf and Hohen Neuendorf in the Oberhavel district of Brandenburg and with the localities Konradshöhe, Tegel and Frohnau. Heiligensee has the westernmost point of Reinickendorf.

=== Subdivision ===
Heiligensee counts 1 zone (Ortslage):

- Schulzendorf

== History ==
The village was founded in 1308.

Between 1945 and 1990 Heiligensee housed West Berlin's inner German border crossing for inland navigation on the Oder-Havel Canal. The crossing was open for freight vessels navigating between the People's Republic of Poland, or the Soviet Zone of occupation in Germany (till 1949, thereafter the East German Democratic Republic) and West Berlin.

After the fall of the Wall, the allied protective powers had left Berlin. Trade and agriculture developed on the former military training areas. The location around Heiligensee station, on which the companies Tetra Pak and Underberg had been settled, is to be abandoned after the urban development plan had become residential areas.

== Getting there ==
Heiligensee is connected by S-Bahn S25 Berlin - Heiligensee, and furthermore, Heiligensee is open during the day with the bus lines 124, 133 (direction Tegel) and 324 (direction Konradshöhe) as well as with the night bus lines N24 and N22. Almost parallel to the railway line since 1987, the A 111 as European route 26 through the district. The connection takes place via junction 3 - Schulzendorfer Straße. Until the fall of the Berlin Wall, at the height of the police barracks on this route, the border checkpoint Heiligensee was also in the GDR.
