= Oberkrämer =

- Municipality
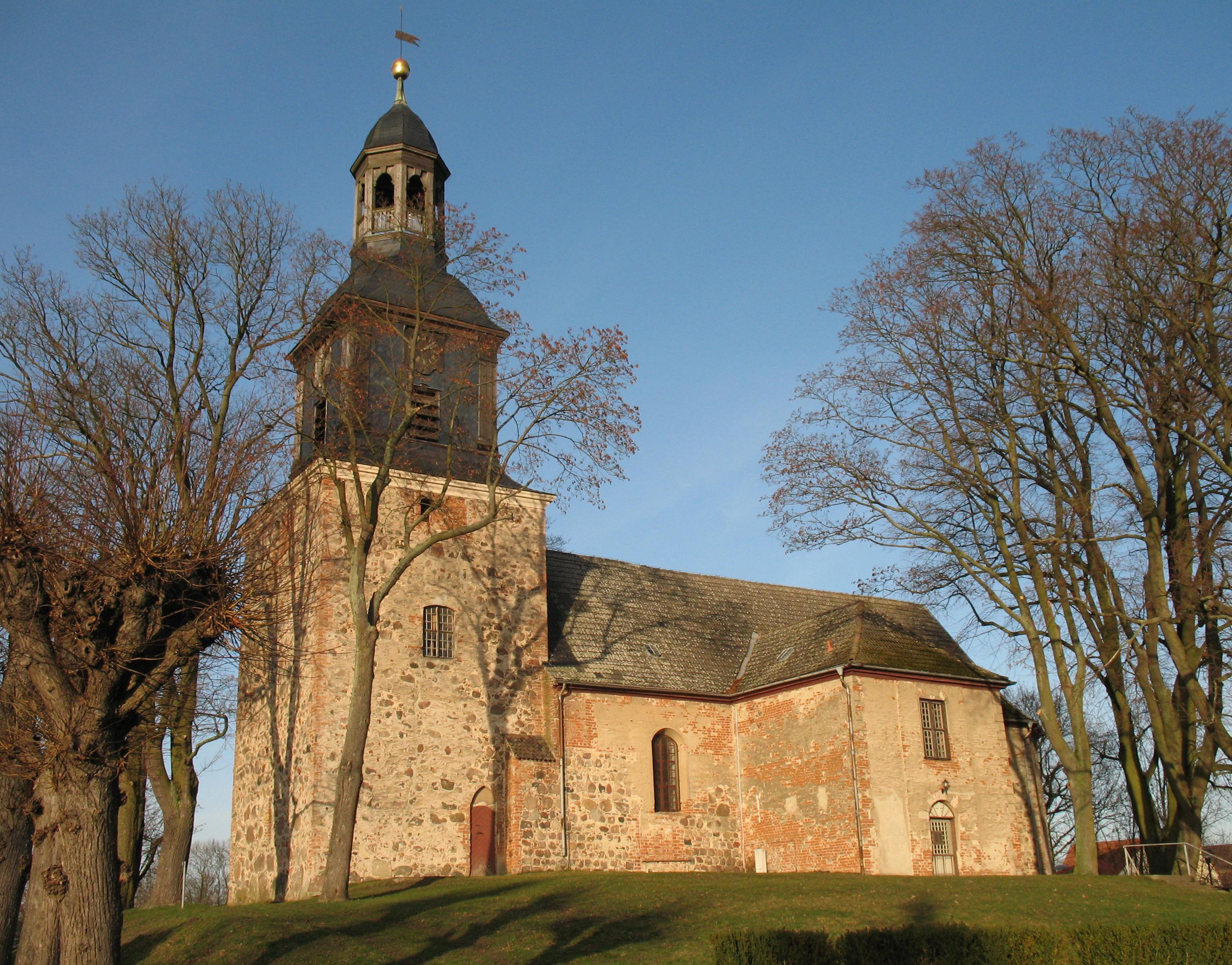
- Church in Vehlefanz

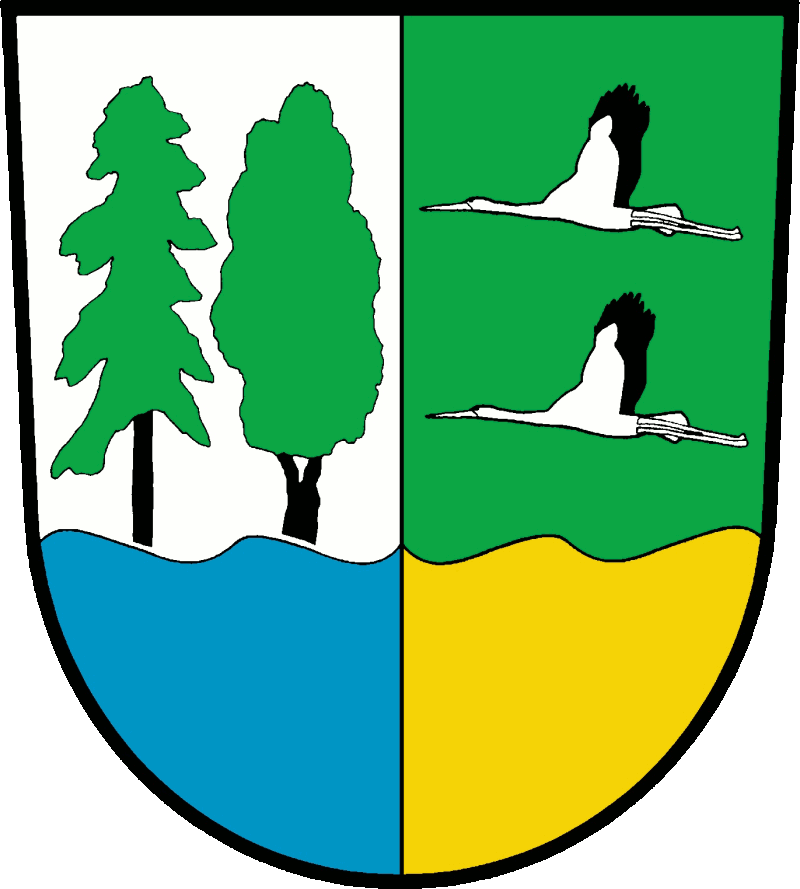
- Coat of arms

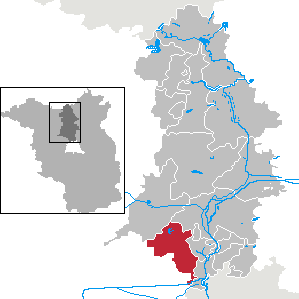
- Location of Oberkrämer within Oberhavel district
- Interactive map of Oberkrämer
- Location within Germany Location within Brandenburg
- Coordinates: 52°42′N 13°06′E
- Country: Germany
- State: Brandenburg
- District: Oberhavel
- Subdivisions: 7 districts

Government
  - Mayor (2022–30): Wolfgang Geppert

Area
  - Total: 103.67 km^{2} (40.03 sq mi)
- Elevation: 54 m (177 ft)

Population (2025-12-31)
  - Total: 12,112
  - Density: 116.83/km^{2} (302.59/sq mi)
- Time zone: UTC+01:00 (CET)
  - Summer (DST): UTC+02:00 (CEST)
- Postal codes: 16727
- Dialling codes: 03304
- Vehicle registration: OHV
- Website: www.oberkraemer.de

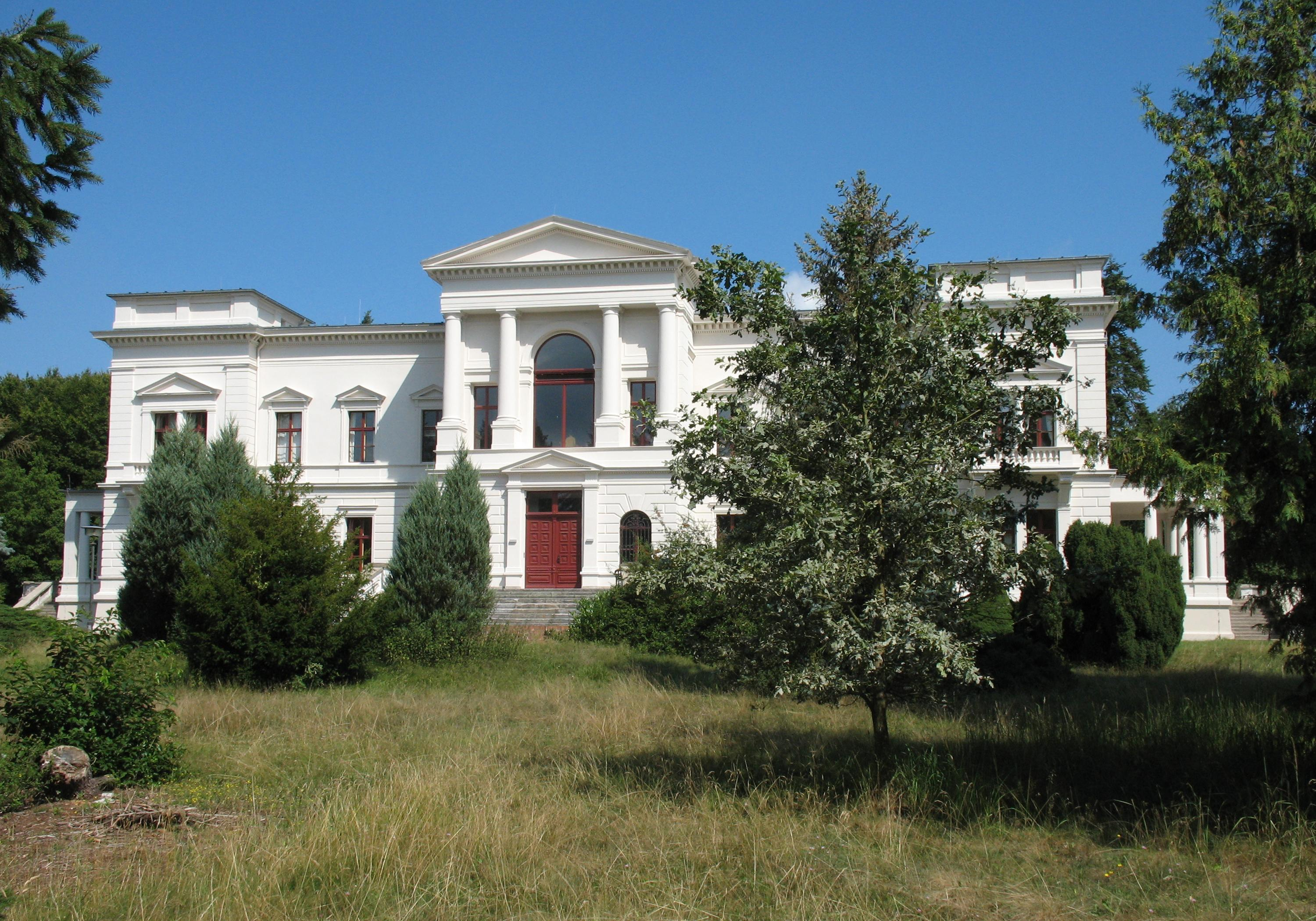
Sommerswalde

Oberkrämer is a municipality in the Oberhavel district, in Brandenburg, Germany. An experimental farm of wind turbines existed between 1941 and 1945 on the 50 m high Matthias mountain in the area.

== Subdivisions ==
Oberkrämer consists of formerly separate municipalities, which as of 31 December 2001 merged with the new municipality of Oberkrämer.

On 27 September 1998, the municipalities of Eichstädt, Neu-Vehlefanz and Vehlefanz merged into the new municipality of Oberkrämer. On 31 December 2001, the municipalities of Bärenklau, Bötzow, Marwitz and Schwante were merged into the municipality of Oberkrämer.

== Demography ==
Development of population since 1875 within the current Boundaries (Blue Line: Population; Dotted Line: Comparison to Population development in Brandenburg state; Grey Background: Time of Nazi Germany; Red Background: Time of communist East Germany)

Recent Population Development and Projections (Population Development before Census 2011 (blue line); Recent Population Development according to the Census in Germany in 2011 (blue bordered line); Official projections for 2005-2030 (yellow line); for 2020-2030 (green line); for 2017-2030 (scarlet line)

Oberkrämer: Population development
within the current boundaries (2020)

Year	Pop.	±% p.a.
1875	3,598	—
1890	4,666	+1.75%
1910	5,453	+0.78%
1925	6,539	+1.22%
1933	7,452	+1.65%
1939	8,627	+2.47%
1946	9,557	+1.47%
1950	10,021	+1.19%
1964	7,797	−1.78%
1971	7,346	−0.85%
1981	6,537	−1.16%
1985	6,278	−1.01%
1989	5,874	−1.65%
1990	5,707	−2.84%
1991	5,578	−2.26%

Year	Pop.	±% p.a.
1992	5,583	+0.09%
1993	5,984	+7.18%
1994	6,350	+6.12%
1995	6,759	+6.44%
1996	7,205	+6.60%
1997	7,931	+10.08%
1998	8,584	+8.23%
1999	9,074	+5.71%
2000	9,457	+4.22%
2001	9,813	+3.76%
2002	10,072	+2.64%
2003	10,298	+2.24%
2004	10,554	+2.49%
2005	10,727	+1.64%
2006	10,812	+0.79%

Year	Pop.	±% p.a.
2007	10,787	−0.23%
2008	10,754	−0.31%
2009	10,706	−0.45%
2010	10,661	−0.42%
2011	10,399	−2.46%
2012	10,404	+0.05%
2013	10,522	+1.13%
2014	10,603	+0.77%
2015	10,876	+2.57%
2016	11,009	+1.22%
2017	11,210	+1.83%
2018	11,390	+1.61%
2019	11,727	+2.96%
2020	11,833	+0.90%

== Photogallery ==
Schwante

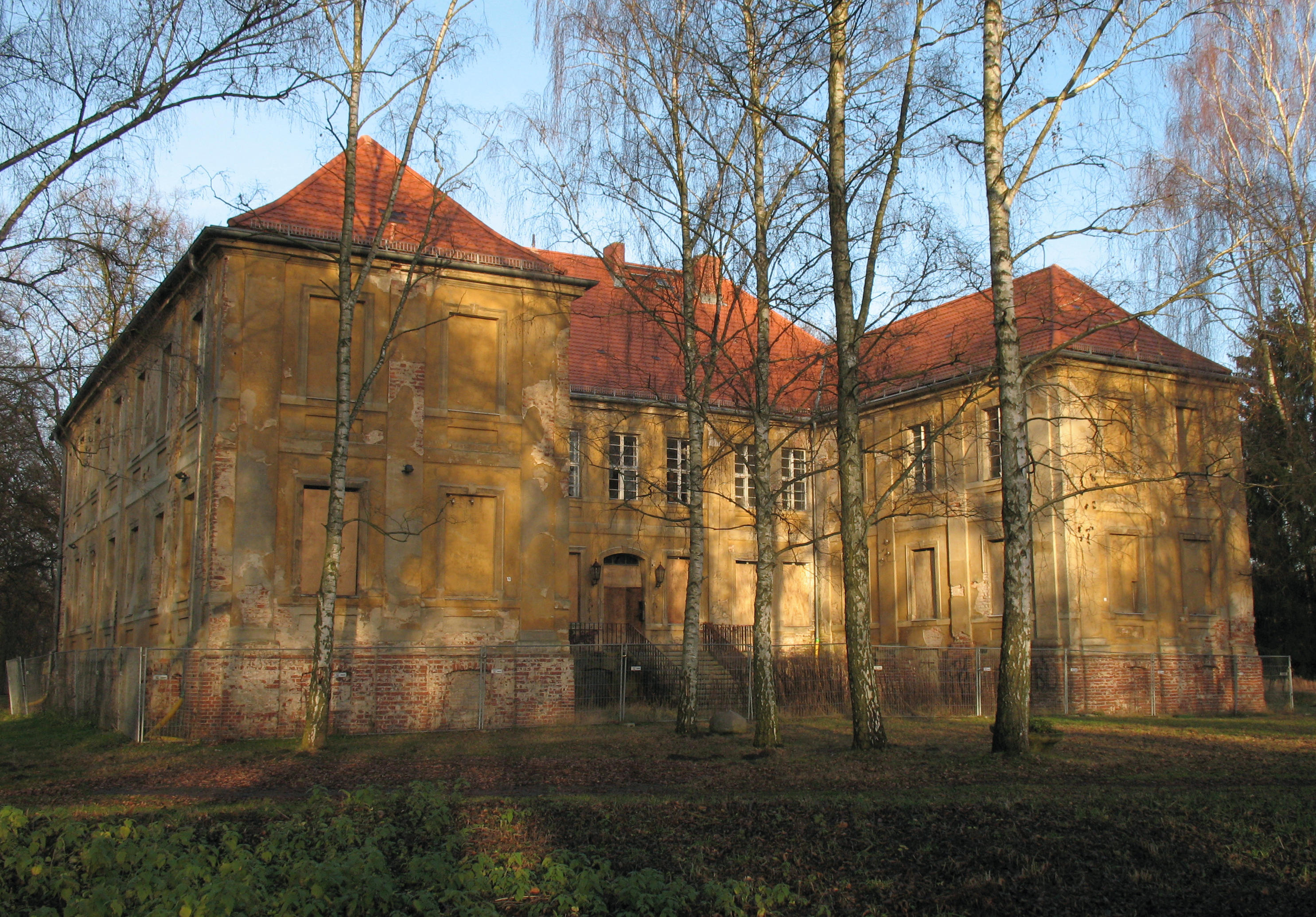
Manor

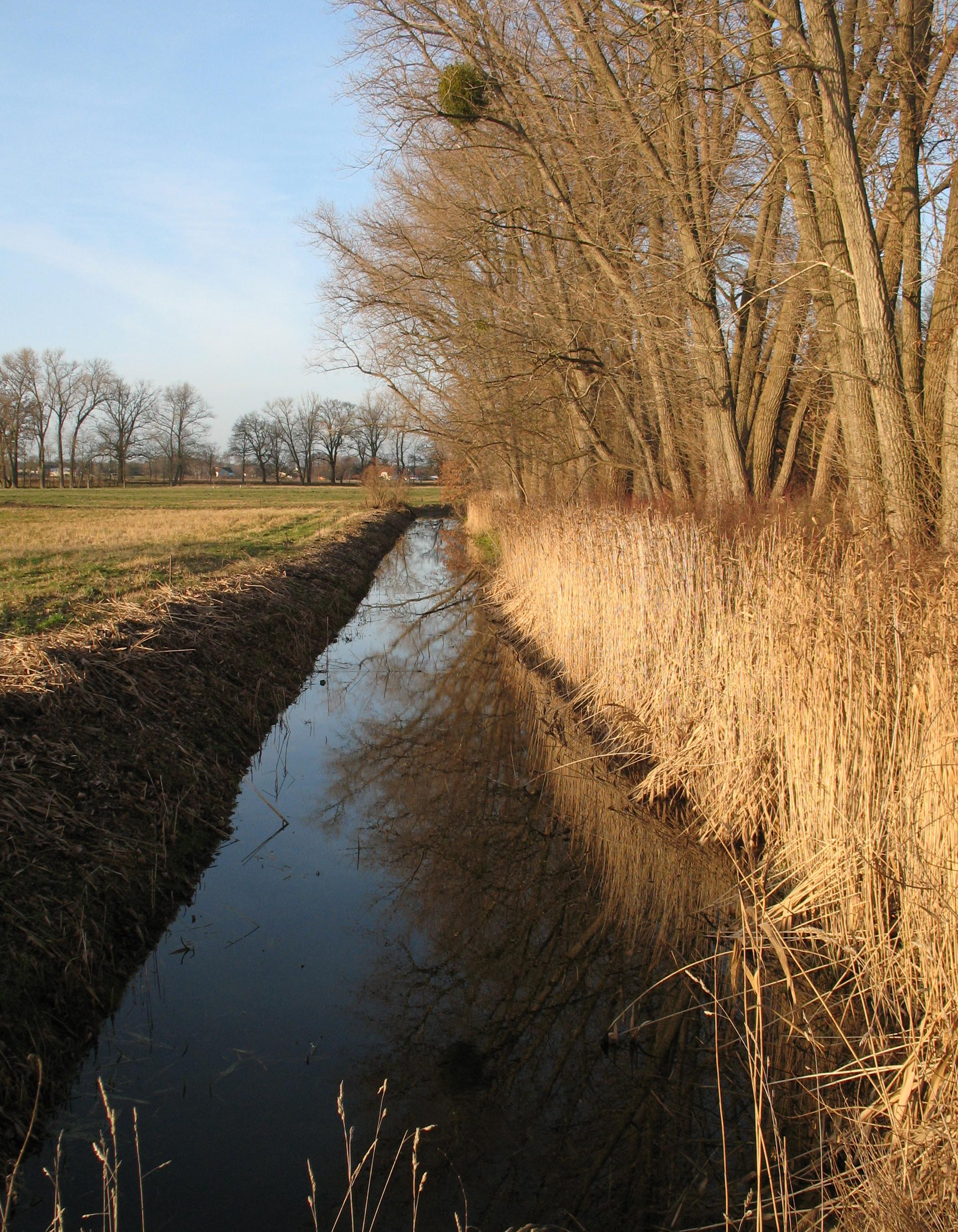
Park

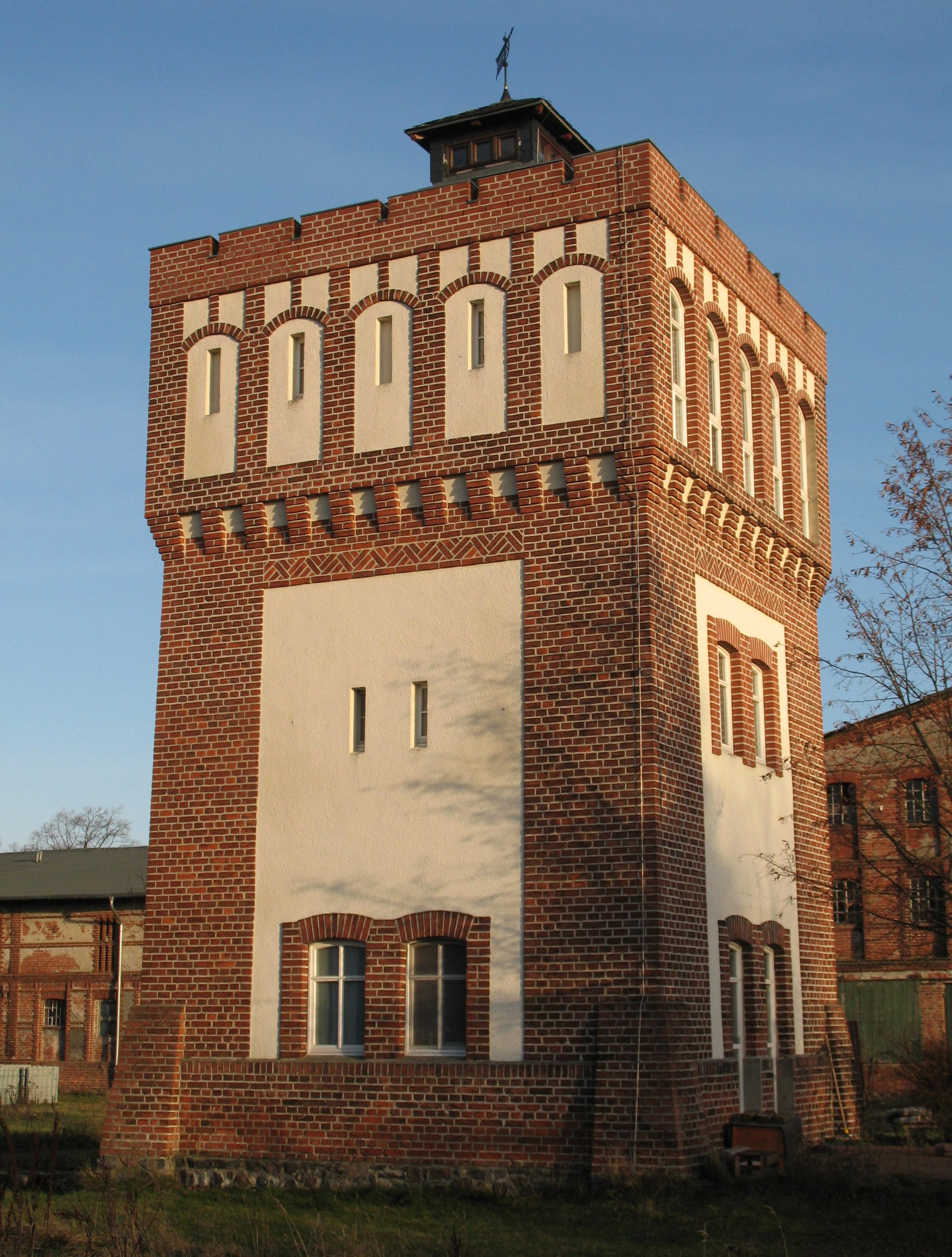
Former water tower
