= Kremmen Railway =

Railway line in Germany

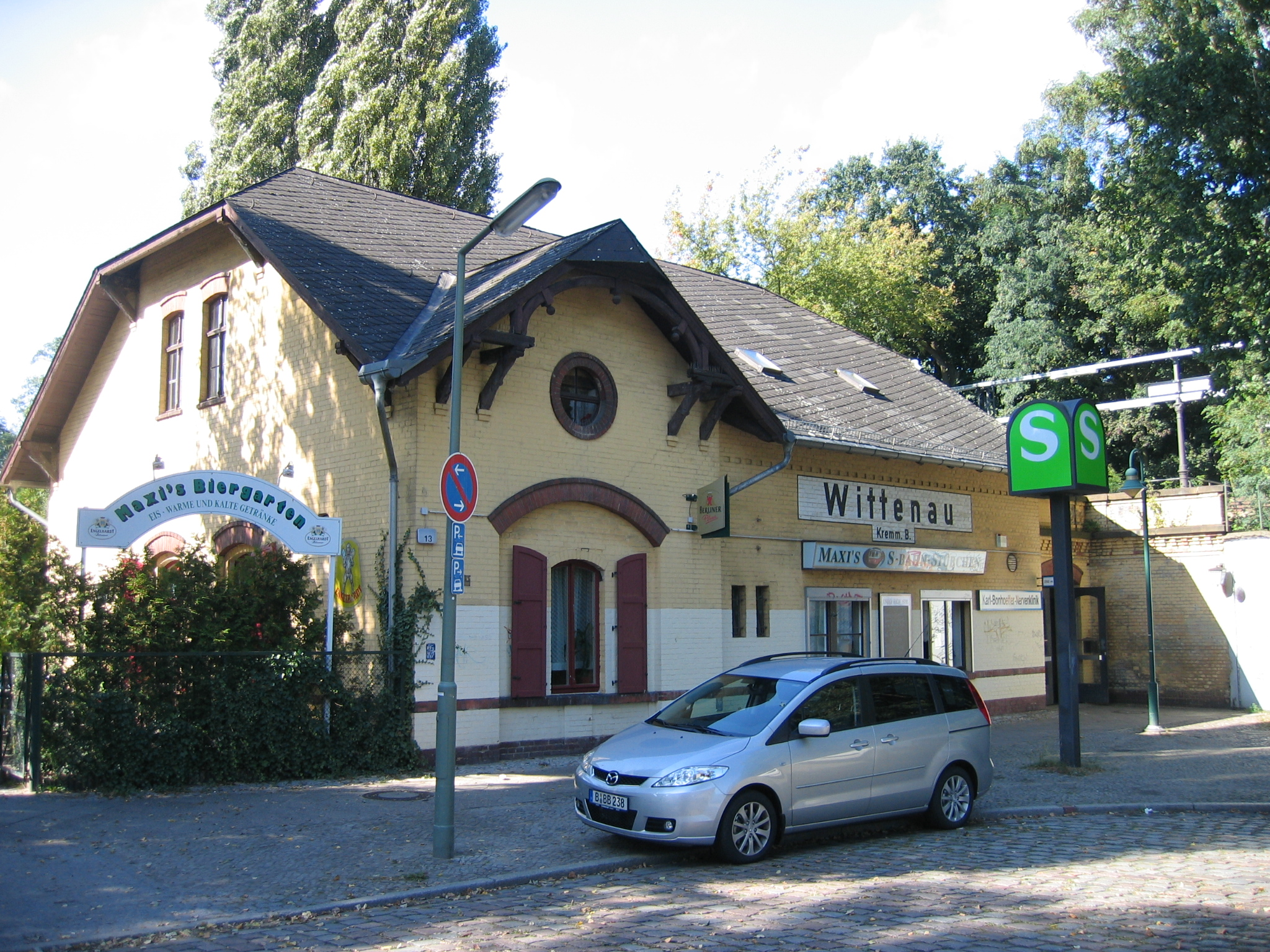
- Berlin Karl-Bonhoeffer-Nervenklinik station with the old name of Wittenau (Kremm. Bahn) on the reception building

Overview
- Line number: 6183
- Locale: Berlin and Brandenburg, Germany

Service
- Route number: 200.25, 206, 209.55

Technical
- Line length: 33.4 km (20.8 mi)
- Track gauge: 1,435 mm (4 ft 8 1/2 in) standard gauge
- Electrification: 750 V DC third rail
- Operating speed: 120 km/h (75 mph) (max)

The Kremmen Railway (German: Kremmener Bahn) is a line in northern Berlin and Brandenburg, Germany. It branches off the Prussian Northern Railway in the Berlin district of Reinickendorf, north of Schönholz station (formerly Schönholz-Reinickendorf) and then passes through Tegel, Hennigsdorf and Velten to Kremmen. There it connects with the Kremmen–Meyenburg line opened in 1898 to Neuruppin.

In contrast to the main line railways that had been built to that time, the Kremmen Railway was the first branch line opened in Berlin. Moreover, it did not have its own terminal station but from the beginning it terminated at the Stettiner Bahnhof. The southern end of the line is now served by Berlin S-Bahn line S25.

== History ==
The campaign for a connection between Berlin and the Ruppin district (now part of Ostprignitz-Ruppin) was led mainly from Velten, the population of which had grown to have over 5,000 as a result of industrialisation. Since the original plan for a private railway could not be implemented, the Prussian state railways took over the project itself. The first section was opened after about two years of construction on 1 October 1893 between Schönholz-Reinickendorf on the Northern Railway and Velten. The second section opened on 20 December 1893 between Velten and Kremmen.

In 1927, the line from Berlin to Velten was electrified on the third-rail DC system of the lines that were later branded as the Berlin S-Bahn. After the establishment of S-Bahn operations, trains from Kremmen generally reversed at Velten, although a few trains ran through to Berlin or later to Hennigsdorf.

Continuous electrical operations ran between Berlin and Velten until the construction of the Berlin Wall on 13 August 1961 interrupted the track between Heiligensee and Hennigsdorf. Subsequently, S-Bahn operations were maintained between Velten and Hennigsdorf as a shuttle operation. In 1958 with the completion of the Berlin outer ring, Hennigsdorf Nord station was established at the rail crossing as a two-level transfer station; it was closed in 1998. In 1983, the north-western sector of the Berlin outer ring was electrified with the standard German AC system. The section between Hennigsdorf and Velten was re-electrified with the AC system.

In West Berlin the S-Bahn operations to Hennigsdorf continued to be run by East German Railways after 1961 until the handover of operations in West Berlin to the Berliner Verkehrsbetriebe (Berlin Transportation Company) on 9 January 1984. On that date, S-Bahn operations on the line to Hennigsdorf were shut down. In 1995 S-Bahn lines were re-established on the line as far as Tegel. North of Tegel part of the railway embankment had been removed to build the Hamburg Autobahn. This gap was not closed until 1998, when Hennigsdorf was reconnected to the S-Bahn network. The reopening of the S-Bahn to Velten is under discussion.

== Current operations ==
The Kremmen railway is now a single-track railway line. In Alt-Reinickendorf, Tegel and Heiligensee there are crossing loops, allowing a 20-minute interval S-Bahn service. In addition, between Hennigsdorf and Velten there are two tracks, with one track used as a test track for the Hennigsdorf locomotive and rollingstock plant of Bombardier Transportation (formerly the Lokomotivbau Elektrotechnische Werke (LEW)). It is equipped with both third rail and overhead electrification, but it is not used for public transport. The only place for trains to pass each other between Hennigsdorf and Kremmen is in Velten station.

In Berlin area S-Bahn line S25 runs on the line to Hennigsdorf station, where there is a connection to Kremmen via Regionalbahn services and Regional-Express line RE6 (Prignitz-Express). This line runs from Berlin-Spandau via the western sector of the Berlin outer ring to Hennigsdorf, where it reverses on to the Kremmen line to Neuruppin and Wittenberge.

In order to operate both AC and DC trains into Hennigsdorf it was decided to avoid electrifying the line there with both systems on the same piece of track. Instead an easier solution was adopted of extending the platform to the south. The southern end is used by the Berlin S-Bahn. The northern end of the platform is used by regional trains with the tracks in between blocked.
