= Hennigsdorf station =

Railway station in Hennigsdorf, Germany

Coordinates: 52.6380°N 13.2057°E

Hennigsdorf (b Berlin)
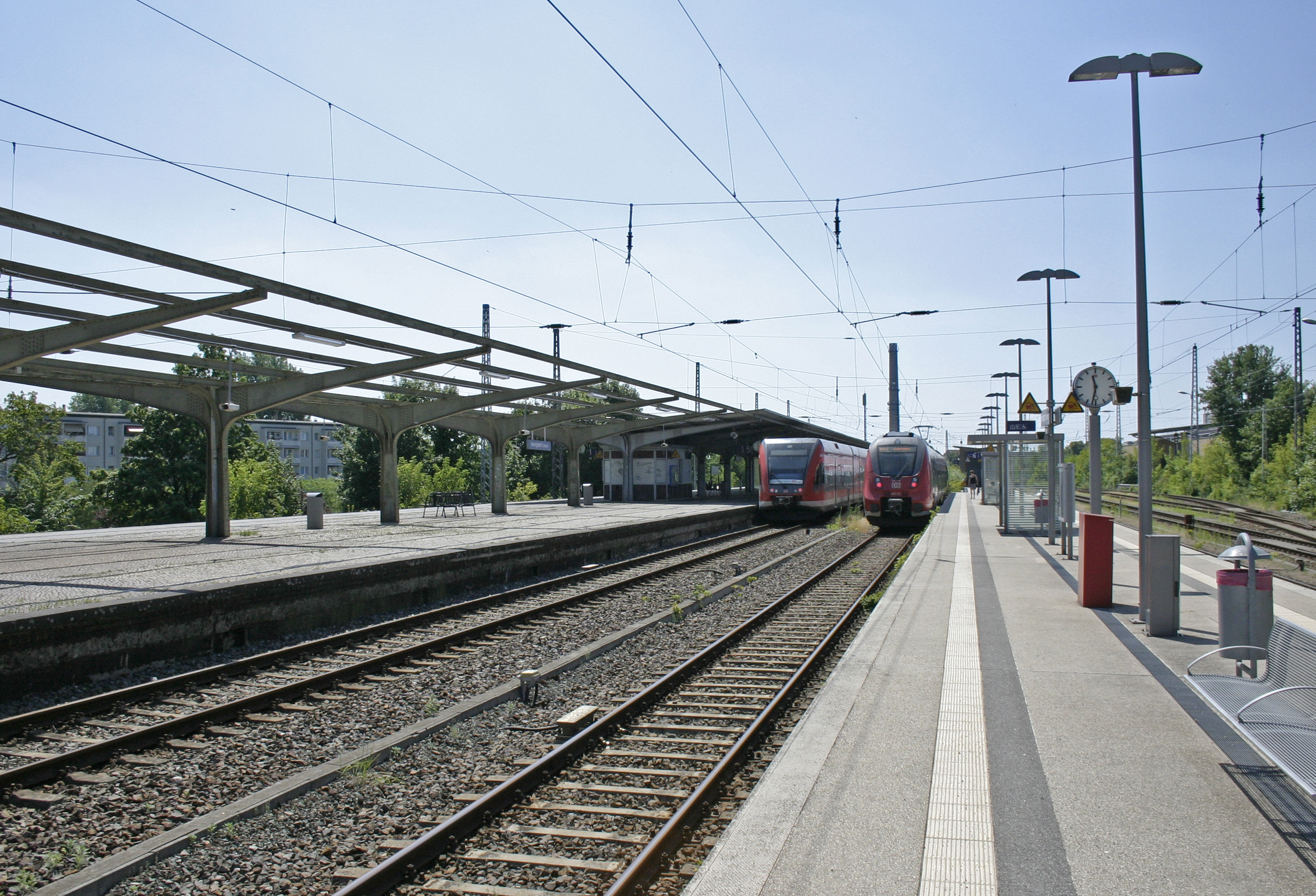

General information
- Location: Postplatz 1; 16761 Hennigsdorf; Brandenburg; Germany
- Owner: Deutsche Bahn
- Operator: DB Station&Service
- Line: Kremmen Railway
- Train operators: DB Regio Nordost; S-Bahn Berlin
- Connections: RE 6; RB 20RB 55; 136 651 807 808 809 811 824

Other information
- Station code: 2691
- DS100 code: BHND,BHD
- IBNR: 8013483
- Category: 3
- Fare zone: VBB: Berlin C/5252
- Website: www.bahnhof.de

History
- Opened: 1 October 1893; 132 years ago

Services
Preceding station	DB Regio Nordost	Following station
Velten (Mark) towards Wittenberge	RE 6	Falkensee towards Berlin-Charlottenburg
Golm towards Potsdam Griebnitzsee	RB 20	Hohen Neuendorf West towards Oranienburg
Velten (Mark) towards Kremmen	RB 55	Terminus
Preceding station	Berlin S-Bahn	Following station
Terminus	S25	Heiligensee towards Teltow Stadt
Location

Hennigsdorf is a railway station in the Oberhavel district of Brandenburg, located in the town of Hennigsdorf. It is the northern terminus of the S-Bahn line S25 as well as a station for regional passenger trains and freight services.

== History ==
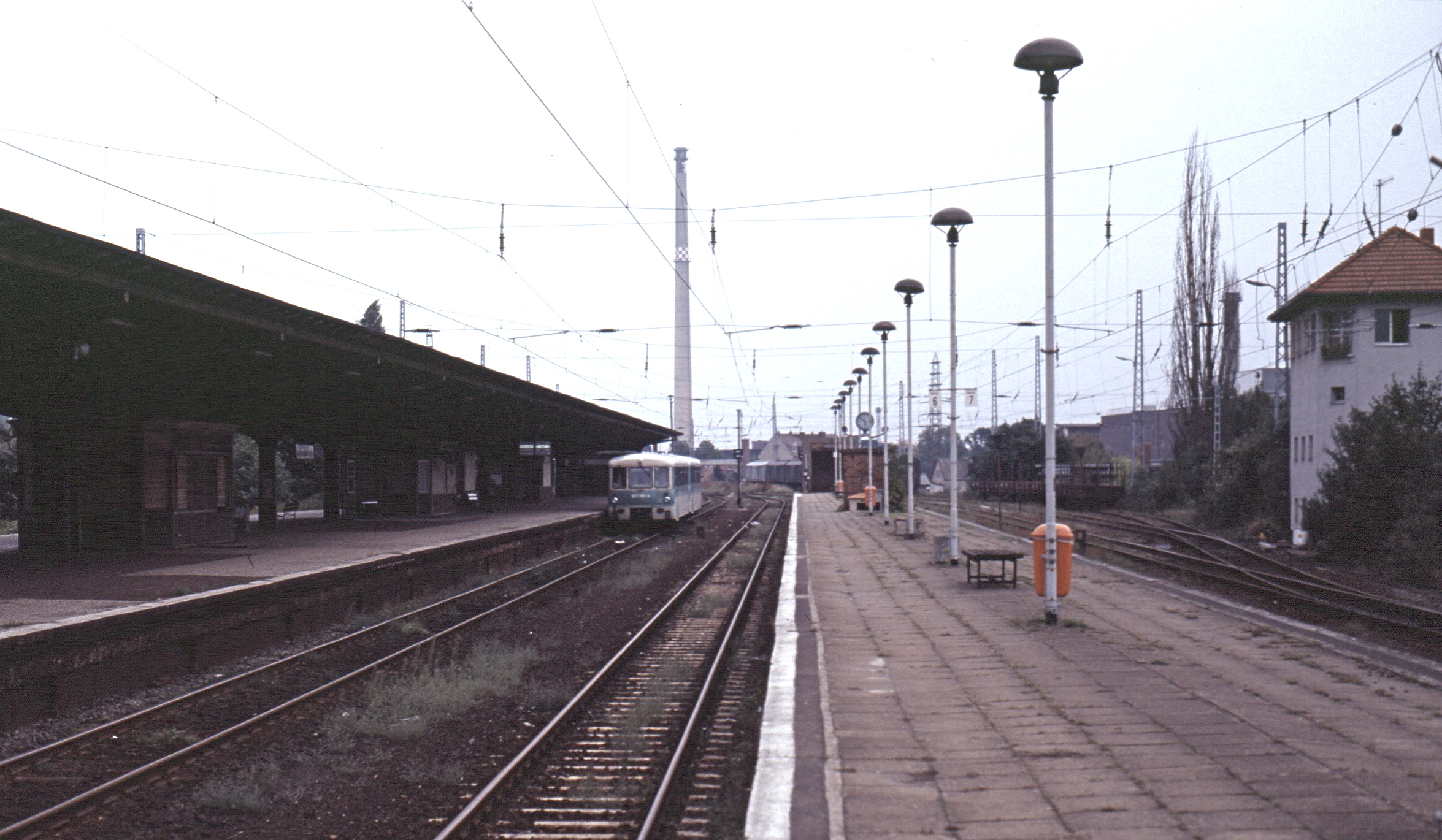
Hennigsdorf station in 1996 with a DR Class VT 2.09 railbus.

The station was opened together with the Berlin–Velten section of the Kremmener Bahn on 1 October 1893. The line was served by frequent commuter trains in particular after 1900, and in 1927 the line between Berlin and Velten was electrified with direct current supplied by a third-rail and became part of the Berlin S-Bahn system. From 1931 until 1945 Hennigsdorf station was also the northern terminus of the branch line from Spandau West which was operated by the Berlin tramways and figured as tramway route 120.

As a consequence of World War II and the German partition, the station was close to the border with West Berlin. The S-Bahn traffic over the border was initially unhindered, but since 1954 a checkpoint station was established between Hennigsdorf station and the border in Hennigsdorf Süd. It was later called Stolpe Süd, and from 1958 it also served the public traffic. To avoid passing West Berlin, the Berlin outer ring was built, which crossed the Kremmener Bahn north of Hennigsdorf since 1953. At the intersection of the two routes an interchange station Hennigsdorf Nord was constructed, facilitating quick and easy transfer of passengers between trains due to its conception on two levels (Turmbahnhof). In addition, two connecting curves were built between Hennigsdorf and the outer ring. As early as 1951, the station was equipped with an all-relay signal box with display interlocking. Together with the stations in Wildau and Königs Wusterhausen it was one of the first three Reichsbahn stations receiving such equipment.

When the border to West Berlin was closed off on 13 August 1961, the rail traffic to Berlin was interrupted, and Hennigsdorf station became a terminus on the territory of the GDR. DC S-Bahn trains between Hennigsdorf and Velten continued to run until 1983, then they were replaced by diesel trains. In 1984, the station, the line to Velten, and the connecting curves to the outer ring were electrified with AC supplied by overhead lines.

The S-Bahn station was reopened on 15 December 1998 when the section between Tegel and Hennigsdorf was taken into service again, initially only with a single track.

The states of Berlin and Brandenburg investigate the feasibility of extending the Regional-Express route from Wittenberge and Wittstock along the Kremmener Bahn to Berlin-Gesundbrunnen station. This would give Hennigsdorf station regional train services towards the south. Between Hennigsdorf and Tegel, the tracks could be shared by S-Bahn and regional trains.

== Train services ==
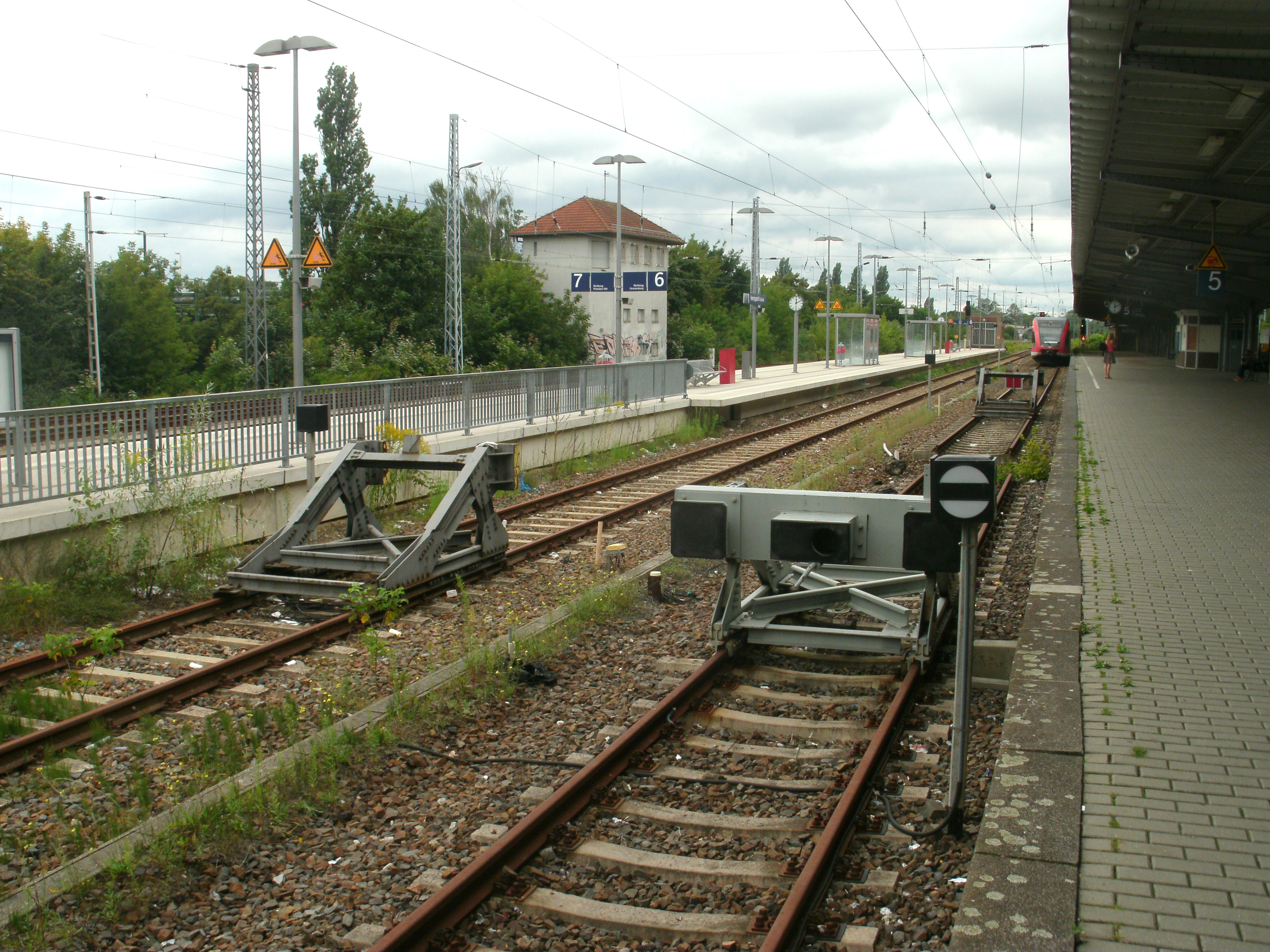
Platforms in Hennigsdorf station with the divided platform tracks on the right platform 1/5 (track 1 is not in the picture): the S-Bahn line S25 stops at the front, regional line RE6 and RB55 at the back. In contrast to the very wide, divided platform 1/5 is the narrow platform 6/7 (left) which is not covered and only served by the line RB20.

The S-Bahn traffic to Berlin was interrupted in 1961 when construction of the Berlin Wall began. Until 1983, S-Bahn trains still operated between Hennigsdorf and Velten, running about twice an hour, albeit without a fixed timetable. In addition, there were some trains to places on the western outer ring and to Oranienburg, especially in rush hour traffic. After 1983, the traffic to Velten was switched to locomotive-hauled trains. The section of Kremmener Bahn between Hennigsdorf and Velten was electrified in 1984 with alternating current. Most of the trains on the outer ring of Berlin did not use Hennigsdorf station, but Hennigsdorf Nord station, which was located outside the city, and trains to and from Velten served as a feeder from and to Hennigsdorf station. Since 1995, Hennigsdorf Nord is no longer served, since most commuter trains leave from the outer ring directly to Hennigsdorf station.

For some time in the years 1994/95, Hennigsdorf station was a terminus of the so-called Duo S-Bahn (line S 19) on the 17-kilometer line to Oranienburg. Between Oranienburg and Birkenwerder these trains ran on DC using the S-Bahn tracks, between Birkenwerder and Hennigsdorf they ran on Diesel power on the Berlin outer ring tracks via Hohen Neuendorf West.

Since 1998, the station is again connected to the Berlin S-Bahn, trains running every 20 minutes and the journey taking 26 minutes to Gesundbrunnen 26 and 34 minutes to Friedrichstraße.

The station is served by the following service(s):

- Regional express services RE 6 Wittenberge – Pritzwalk – Wittstock – Neuruppin – Hennigsdorf – Berlin
- Regionalbahn (local services) RB 20 Potsdam – Golm – Hennigsdorf – Oranienburg
- Regionalbahn RB 55 Kremmen – Hennigsdorf
- Berlin S-Bahn route Hennigsdorf – Tegel – Gesundbrunnen – Friedrichstraße – Potsdamer Platz – Sudkreuz – Lichterfelde – Teltow
