= List of Berlin S-Bahn stations =

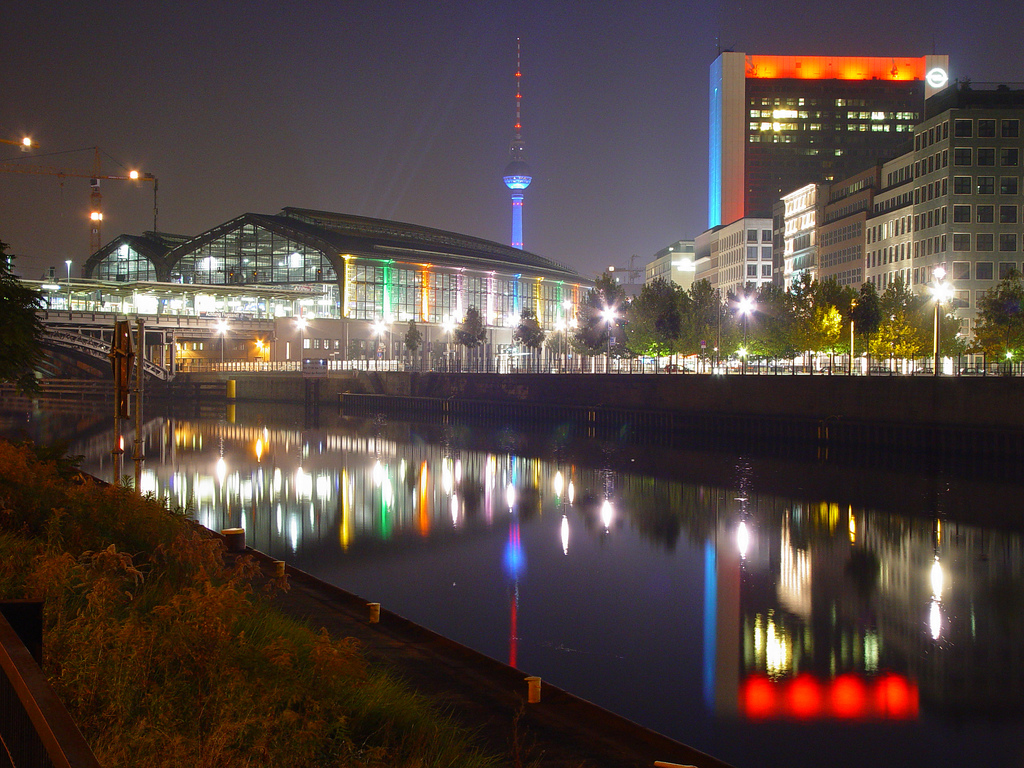
Berlin Friedrichstraße

This is an alphabetical list of Berlin S-Bahn stations. As of 2023, there were 168 active stations.

Station	Line(s)	Opened	Notes
Adlershof	S45 S46 S8 S85 S9		
Ahrensfelde	S7		
Albrechtshof	Hamburg Line	August 14, 1951	closed October 9, 1961
Albrechtshof	DB	April 1, 1943	closed May 23, 1993 - 1995
Alexanderplatz	S3 S5 S7 S9		
Alexanderplatz	U2 U5 U8		
Alexanderplatz	DB		
Altglienicke	S45 S9		
Alt-Reinickendorf	S25		
Anhalter Bahnhof	S1 S2 S25 S26		
Attilastraße	S2		
Baumschulenweg	S45 S46 S47 S8 S85 S9		
Bellevue	S3 S5 S7 S9		
BER Airport	S45 S9		
BER Airport	DB		
Bergfelde	S8		
Bernau bei Berlin	S2		
Bernau bei Berlin	DB		
Bernau-Friedenstal	S2		
Beusselstraße	S41 S42		
Biesdorf	S5		
Birkenstein	S5		
Birkenwerder	S1 S8		
Birkenwerder	DB		
Blankenburg	S2 S8		
Blankenfelde	S2		
Blankenfelde	DB		
Borgsdorf	S1		
Bornholmer Straße	S1 S2 S25 S26 S8 S85		
Botanischer Garten	S1		
Brandenburger Tor	S1 S2 S25 S26		
Brandenburger Tor	U5		
Buch	S2		
Buckower Chaussee	S2		
Bundesplatz	S41 S42 S46		
Bundesplatz	U9		
Charlottenburg	S3 S5 S7 S9		
Charlottenburg	U7 (at Wilmersdorfer Straße)		
Charlottenburg	DB		
Dahlewitz	Dresden Line	October 6, 1940	closed September 12, 1961
Dahlewitz	DB	September 7, 1884	
Dreilinden	Cemetery Line	July 10, 1928	closed August 13, 1961
Düppel	Trunk Line	June 2, 1939	closed September 18, 1980
Düppel	DR	June 2, 1939	closed April 1945
Eichborndamm	S25		
Eichwalde	S46 S8		
Erkner	S3		
Falkensee	Hamburg Line	August 14, 1951	closed October 9, 1961
Falkensee	DB	1848	
Feuerbachstraße	S1		
Frankfurter Allee	S41 S42 S8 S85		
Frankfurter Allee	U5		
Fredersdorf	S5		
Friedenau	S1		
Friedrichsfelde Ost	S5 S7 S75		
Friedrichshagen	S3		
Friedrichstraße	S1 S2 S25 S26 S3 S5 S7 S9		
Friedrichstraße	U6		
Friedrichstraße	DB		
Frohnau	S1		
Gartenfeld	Siemensbahn	December 18, 1929	closed September 18, 1980
Gehrenseestraße	S75		
Gesundbrunnen	S1 S15 S2 S25 S26 S41 S42		
Gesundbrunnen	U8		
Gesundbrunnen	DB		
Greifswalder Straße	S41 S42 S8 S85		
Grünau	S46 S8 S85		
Grünbergallee	S45 S9		
Grunewald	S7		
Hackescher Markt	S3 S5 S7 S9		
Halensee	S41 S42 S46		
Hauptbahnhof	S15 S3 S5 S7 S9		
Hauptbahnhof	DB		
Heerstraße	S3 S9		
Hegermühle	S5		
Heidelberger Platz	S41 S42 S46		
Heidelberger Platz	U3		
Heiligensee	S25		
Hennigsdorf	S25	March 16, 1927	closed September 20, 1983 - 1998
Hennigsdorf	DB	October 1, 1893	
Hennigsdorf Nord	Kremmen Line	August 18, 1958	closed September 21, 1983
Hennigsdorf Nord	DB	April 30, 1953	closed May 30, 1998
Hermannstraße	S41 S42 S45 S46 S47		
Hermannstraße	U8		
Hermsdorf	S1		
Hirschgarten	S3		
Hohen Neuendorf	S1 S8		
Hohenschönhausen	S75		
Hohenschönhausen	DB		
Hohenschöpping	Kremmen Line	April 13, 1938	closed December 1, 1946 - 1950 closed September 20, 1983
Hohenschöpping	DB	April 13, 1938	closed May 24, 1998
Hohenzollerndamm	S41 S42 S46		
Hoppegarten (Mark)	S5		
Humboldthain	S1 S2 S25 S26		
Innsbrucker Platz	S41 S42 S46		
Innsbrucker Platz	U4		
Jannowitzbrücke	S3 S5 S7 S9		
Jannowitzbrücke	U8		
Julius-Leber-Brücke	S1		
Johannisthal	S45 S46 S8 S85 S9	July 11, 1945	renamed from Betriebsbahnhof Schöneweide in 2020
Jungfernheide	S41 S42		
Jungfernheide	U7		
Jungfernheide	DB		
Karl-Bonhoeffer-Nervenklinik	S25		
Karl-Bonhoeffer-Nervenklinik	U8		
Karlshorst	S3		
Karow	S2		
Karow	DB		
Kaulsdorf	S5		
Kohlhasenbrück	Wetzlar Line	February 16, 1946	closed July 7, 1946
Köllnische Heide	S45 S46 S47		
Königs Wusterhausen	S46		
Königs Wusterhausen	DB		
Köpenick	S3		
Landsberger Allee	S41 S42 S8 S85		
Lankwitz	S25 S26		
Lehnitz	S1		
Lichtenberg	S5 S7 S75		
Lichtenberg	U5		
Lichtenberg	DB		
Lichtenrade	S2		
Lichterfelde Ost	S25 S26		
Lichterfelde Ost	DB		
Lichterfelde Süd	S25 S26		
Lichterfelde West	S1		
Mahlow	S2		
Mahlsdorf	S5		
Marienfelde	S2		
Marzahn	S7		
Mehrower Allee	S7		
Messe Nord/ICC	S41 S42 S46		
Messe Nord/ICC	U2 (at Kaiserdamm)		
Messe Süd	S3 S9		
Mexikoplatz	S1		
Mühlenbeck-Mönchmühle	S8		
Neuenhagen	S5		
Neukölln	S41 S42 S45 S46 S47		
Neukölln	U7		
Nikolassee	S1 S7		
Nöldnerplatz	S5 S7 S75		
Nordbahnhof	S1 S2 S25 S26		
Oberspree	S47		
Olympiastadion	S3 S9		
Oranienburg	S1		
Oranienburg	DB		
Oranienburger Straße	S1 S2 S25 S26		
Osdorfer Straße	S25 S26	September 25, 1998	
Ostbahnhof	S3 S5 S7 S9		
Ostbahnhof	DB		
Ostkreuz	S3 S41 S42 S5 S7 S75 S8 S85		
Pankow	S2 S8 S85		
Pankow	U2		
Pankow-Heinersdorf	S2 S8		
Petershagen Nord	S5		
Pichelsberg	S3 S9		
Plänterwald	S8 S85 S9		
Poelchaustraße	S7		
Potsdam-Babelsberg	S7		
Potsdam Griebnitzsee	S7		
Potsdam Griebnitzsee	DB		
Potsdamer Bahnhof	Ring Line	April 18, 1929	closed July 3, 1944; demolished
Potsdamer Bahnhof	Wannsee Line	May 15, 1933	closed July 27, 1946; demolished
Potsdamer Bahnhof	DR	October 29, 1838	closed February 1945; demolished
Potsdam Hbf	S7		
Potsdam Hbf	DB		
Potsdamer Platz	S1 S2 S25 S26		
Potsdamer Platz	U2		
Potsdamer Platz	DB		
Prenzlauer Allee	S41 S42 S8 S85		
Priesterweg	S2 S25 S26		
Rahnsdorf	S3		
Rangsdorf	Dresden Line	October 6, 1940	closed September 12, 1961
Rangsdorf	DB	June 17, 1875	
Raoul-Wallenberg-Straße	S7		
Rathaus Steglitz	S1		
Rathaus Steglitz	U9		
Röntgental	S2		
Rummelsburg	S3		
Rummelsburg Betriebsbahnhof	S3		
Savignyplatz	S3 S5 S7 S9		
Schichauweg	S2		
Schlachtensee	S1		
Schöneberg	S1 S41 S42 S46		
Schönefeld (bei Berlin)	S45 S9		
Schöneweide	S45 S46 S47 S8 S85 S9		
Schöneweide	DB		
Schönfließ	S8		
Schönhauser Allee	S41 S42 S8 S85		
Schönhauser Allee	U2		
Schönholz	S1 S25 S26		
Schulzendorf	S25		
Siemensstadt	Siemensbahn	December 18, 1929	closed September 18, 1980
Siemensstadt-Fürstenbrunn	Hamburg Line	June 1, 1905	closed September 18, 1980; demolished
Sonnenallee	S41 S42		
Spandau	S3 S9		
Spandau	U7 (at Rathaus Spandau)		
Spandau	DB		
Spindlersfeld	S47		
Springpfuhl	S7 S75		
Staaken	Lehrte Line	August 3, 1951	closed August 13, 1961 – 1962 closed 1980
Staaken	DB	August 15, 1900	closed 1995–1999
Stahnsdorf	Cemetery Line	July 10, 1928	closed August 13, 1961; demolished
Stolpe Süd	Kremmen Railway	June 4, 1954	closed August 14, 1961
Storkower Straße	S41 S42 S8 S85		
Strausberg	S5		
Strausberg	DB		
Strausberg Nord	S5		
Strausberg Stadt	S5		
Stresow	S3 S9		
Südende	S25 S26		
Südkreuz	S2 S25 S26 S41 S42 S45 S46		
Südkreuz	DB		
Sundgauer Straße	S1		
Tegel	S25		
Tegel	U6 (at Alt-Tegel)		
Teltow	Anhalt Line	July 7, 1951	closed August 13, 1961
Teltow	DB	October 1, 1901	
Teltow Stadt	S25 S26		
Tempelhof	S41 S42 S45 S46		
Tempelhof	U6		
Tiergarten	S3 S5 S7 S9		
Treptower Park	S41 S42 S8 S85 S9		
Velten	Kremmen Line	March 16, 1927	closed September 20, 1983
Velten	DB	October 1, 1983	
Waidmannslust	S1 S26		
Wannsee	S1 S7		
Wannsee	DB		
Warschauer Straße	S3 S5 S7 S75 S9		
Warschauer Straße	U1 U3		
Wartenberg	S75		
Waßmannsdorf	S45 S9	October 26, 2020	
Wedding	S15 S41 S42		
Wedding	U6		
Wernerwerk	Siemensbahn	December 18, 1929	closed September 18, 1980
Westend	S41 S42 S46		
Westhafen	S41 S42		
Westhafen	U9		
Westkreuz	S3 S41 S42 S46 S5 S7 S9		
Wildau	S46 S8		
Wilhelmshagen	S3		
Wilhelmsruh	S1 S26		
Wittenau	S1 S26		
Wittenau	U8		
Wollankstraße	S1 S25 S26		
Wuhletal	S5		
Wuhletal	U5		
Wuhlheide	S3		
Yorckstraße	S1 S2 S25 S26		
Yorckstraße	U7		
Zehlendorf	S1		
Zehlendorf Süd	Trunk Line	December 20, 1972	closed September 18, 1980
Zepernick	S2		
Zeuthen	S46 S8		
Zoologischer Garten	S3 S5 S7 S9		
Zoologischer Garten	U2 U9		
Zoologischer Garten	DB		

== See also ==
- List of Berlin U-Bahn stations
