= Baumschulenweg station =

Railway station in Berlin, Germany

Baumschulenweg
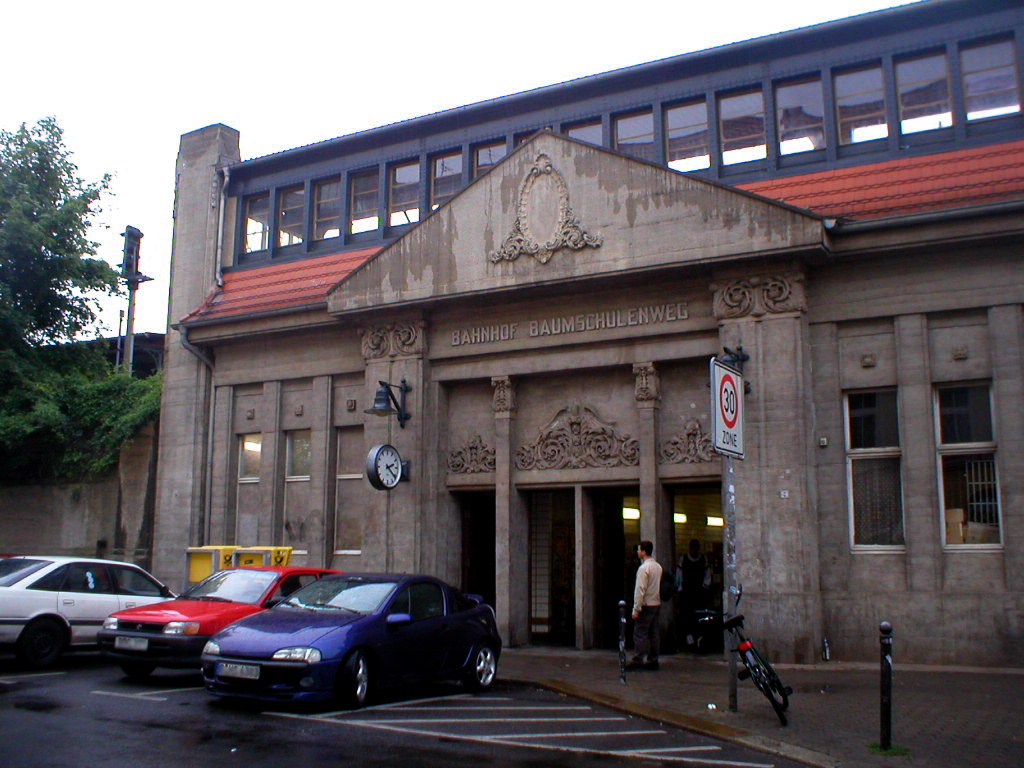

General information
- Location: Treptow-Köpenick, Berlin, Berlin; Germany
- Coordinates: 52°28′00″N 13°29′28″E
- Owner: DB Netz
- Operator: DB Station&Service
- Lines: Berlin–Görlitz railway; Baumschulenweg–Neukölln
- Platforms: 3 S-Bahn tracks; 2 long distance tracks
- Train operators: S-Bahn Berlin
- Connections: 165 170 265 365

Other information
- Station code: 430
- DS100 code: BBW
- IBNR: 8089004
- Category: 4
- Fare zone: : Berlin B/5656
- Website: www.bahnhof.de

History
- Opened: 20 May 1890; 136 years ago

Services
Preceding station	Berlin S-Bahn	Following station
Köllnische Heide towards Südkreuz	S45	Schöneweide towards BER Airport
Köllnische Heide towards Westend	S46	Schöneweide towards Königs Wusterhausen
Köllnische Heide towards Hermannstraße	S47	Schöneweide towards Spindlersfeld
Plänterwald towards Birkenwerder	S8	Schöneweide towards Wildau
Plänterwald towards Waidmannslust	S85	Schöneweide towards Grünau
Plänterwald towards Spandau	S9	Schöneweide towards BER Airport
Location

Berlin-Baumschulenweg is a railway station in the Treptow-Köpenick district of Berlin, served by the S-Bahn lines S45, S46, S47, S8, S85 and S9.
