= Berlin-Neukölln station =

Railway station in Berlin, Germany

Berlin Neukölln (Südring)
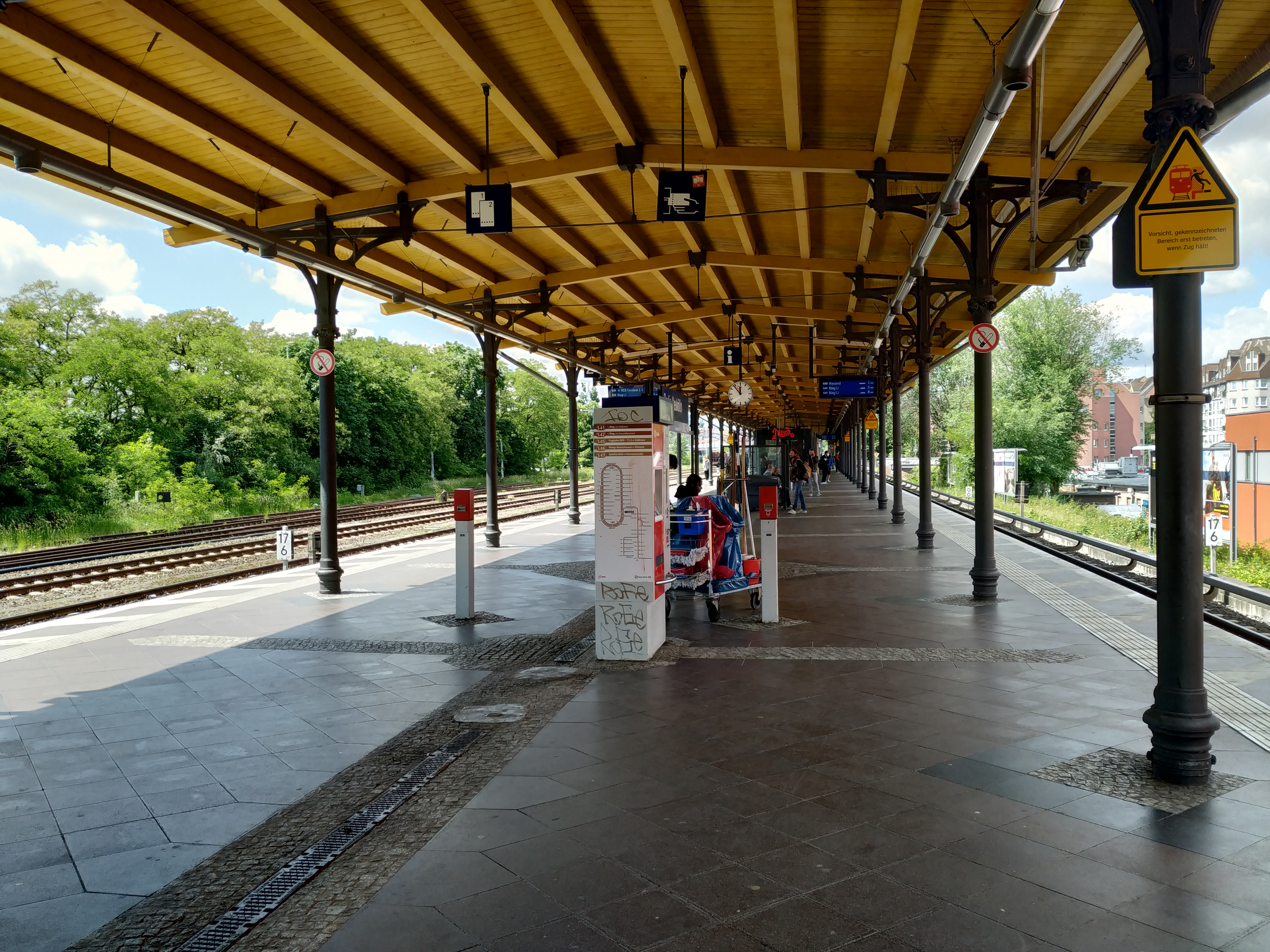
- 2022

General information
- Location: Karl-Marx-Straße/Saalestraße 1; 12055 Berlin; Neukölln; Germany
- Owner: DB Netz
- Operator: DB Station&Service
- Lines: Ringbahn (KBS 200.4x); Baumschulenweg–Neukölln link line (KBS 200.4x)
- Platforms: 1 island platform
- Tracks: 2
- Connections: 171 N7 N79

Other information
- Station code: 554
- DS100 code: BNK
- IBNR: 8089077
- Category: 4
- Fare zone: VBB: Berlin A/5555
- Website: www.bahnhof.de

History
- Opened: main line: 1 January 1872; 154 years ago 21 December 1930; 95 years ago
- Electrified: 6 November 1928; 97 years ago at opening
- Former names: 1872-1912 Rixdorf; 1912-1938 Neukölln; 1930-1961 and since 1993 Neukölln (Südring); 1961-1993 Neukölln

Key dates
- 1930: current building erected
- 1945, late April - 18 June: operation interrupted
- 1980-1993: operation interrupted

Services
Preceding station	Berlin S-Bahn	Following station
Sonnenallee One-way operation	S41	Hermannstraße Ringbahn (clockwise)
Sonnenallee Ringbahn (counter-clockwise)	S42	Hermannstraße One-way operation
Hermannstraße towards Südkreuz	S45	Köllnische Heide towards BER Airport
Hermannstraße towards Westend	S46	Köllnische Heide towards Königs Wusterhausen
Hermannstraße Terminus	S47	Köllnische Heide towards Spindlersfeld
Preceding station	Berlin U-Bahn	Following station
Karl-Marx-Straße towards Rathaus Spandau	U7 transfer at Neukölln	Grenzallee towards Rudow
Location

Berlin-Neukölln is a railway station in the Neukölln district of Berlin. It is served by the S-Bahn lines S41, S42, S45, S46 and S47 and the U-Bahn line U7.

== History ==
Berlin-Neukölln opened in 1872, first under the name Rixdorf, as a station on the Ringbahn. Both the district and the station changed name from Rixdorf to Neukölln in 1912. The current station building was erected in 1930 by Alfred Grenander to create an interchange with the underground station which opened in that year.

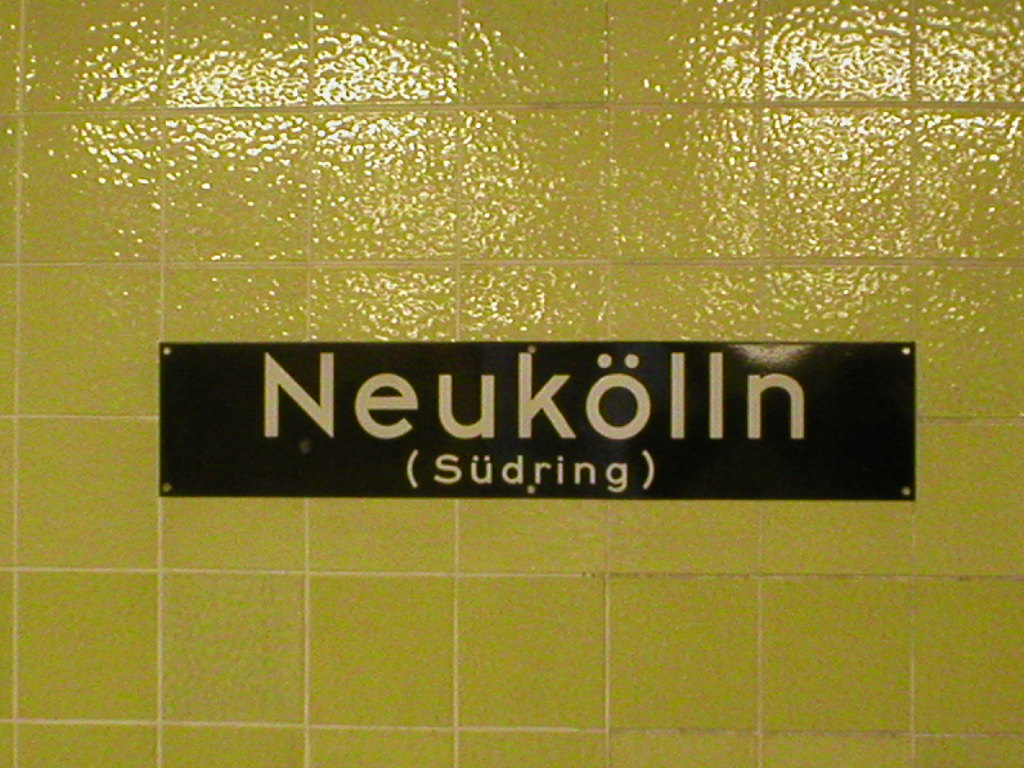
U-Bahn station sign showing the reinstated addition "Südring"

Until 1961 the U-Bahn station was named Neukölln (Südring) to refer to the S-Bahn connection. However, Südring was removed from the name after the Berlin Wall was built. The S-Bahn had become unpopular and subject to boycotts in West Berlin due to its link to the East German government. In 1980 the Ringbahn ceased operating. The Ringbahn connection was reestablished in 1992 after the fall of the Berlin Wall, and the addition Südring was also reinstated.

== Popular culture ==
The front of the station features heavily in the German documentary Neukölln Unlimited as a place where the film's main subjects are often seen.

== See also ==
Transportation in Neukölln
