= Köllnische Heide station =

Railway station in Berlin, Germany

Coordinates: 52.4696°N 13.4682°E

Köllnische Heide
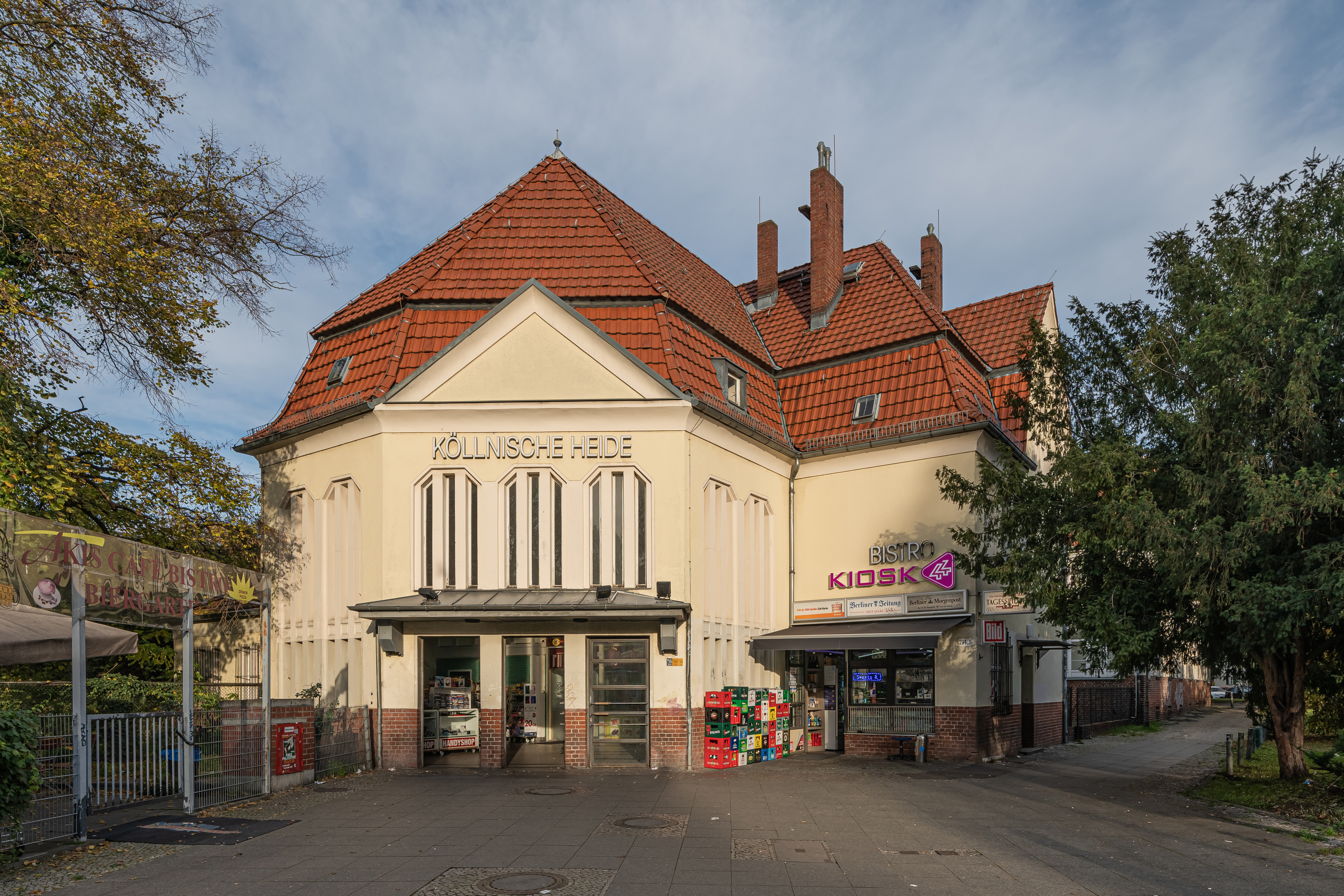
- Station entrance (2023)

General information
- Location: Sonnenallee/Krebsgang; 12057 Berlin; Neukölln; Berlin; Germany
- Owner: DB Netz
- Operator: DB Station&Service
- Lines: Baumschulenweg–Neukölln (KBS 200.4x)
- Platforms: 1 island platform
- Tracks: 2
- Train operators: S-Bahn Berlin
- Connections: M41 341 N70

Other information
- Station code: 3318
- DS100 code: BKHD
- IBNR: 8089104
- Category: 5
- Fare zone: VBB: Berlin B/5656
- Website: www.bahnhof.de

History
- Opened: 19 August 1920; 105 years ago 17 December 1993; 32 years ago
- Closed: 17 September 1980; 45 years ago

Services
Preceding station	Berlin S-Bahn	Following station
Neukölln towards Südkreuz	S45	Baumschulenweg towards BER Airport
Neukölln towards Westend	S46	Baumschulenweg towards Königs Wusterhausen
Neukölln towards Hermannstraße	S47	Baumschulenweg towards Spindlersfeld
Location
- Location within Berlin

Köllnische Heide is a railway station in the Neukölln district of Berlin. It is served by the S-Bahn line S45, S46 and S47.
