= Baumschulenweg–Neukölln link line =

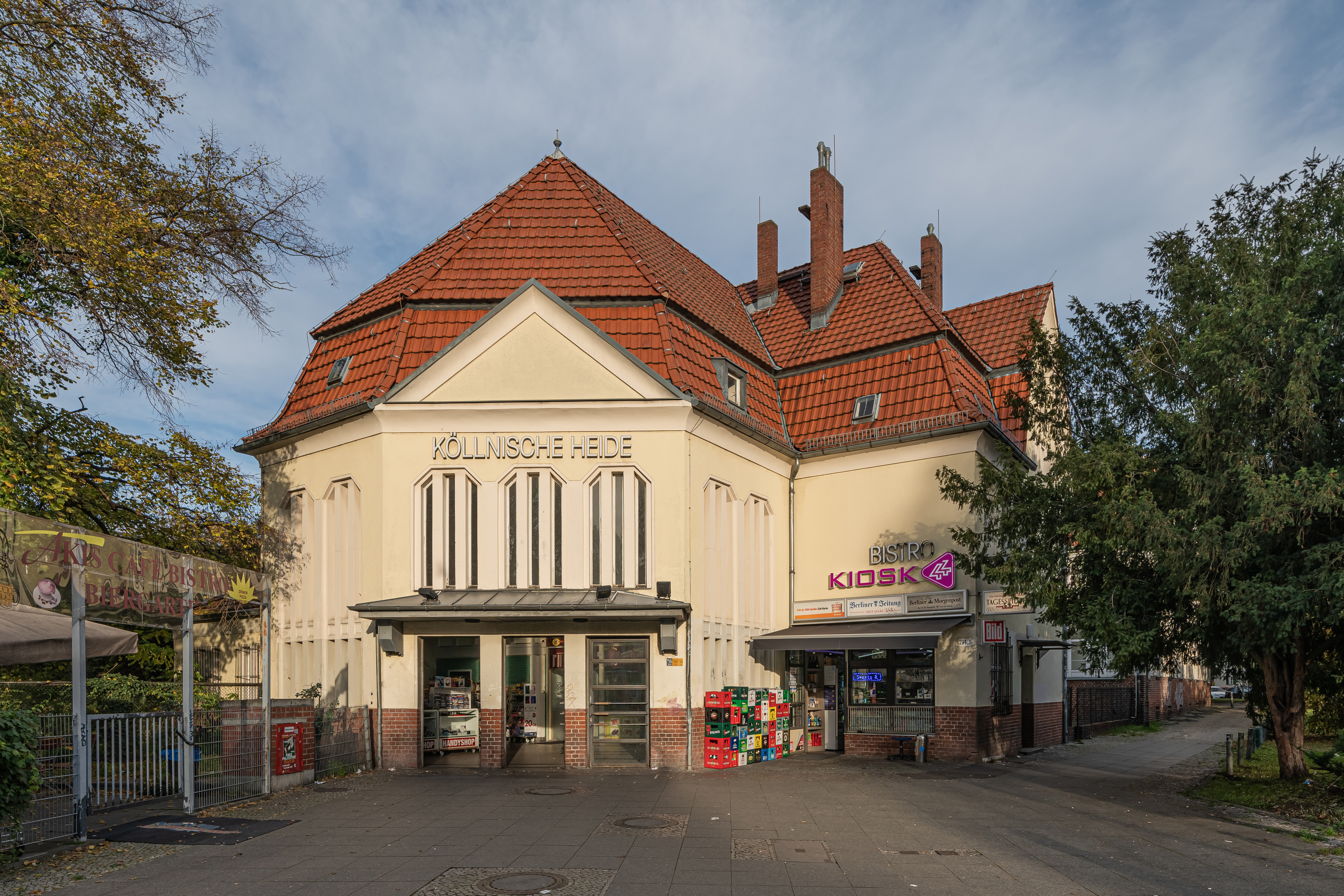
- Köllnische Heide station on the line

Overview
- Line number: 6021
- Locale: Berlin

Service
- Route number: 200.45, 200.46, 200.47

Technical
- Line length: 5.3 km (3.3 mi)
- Track gauge: 1,435 mm (4 ft 8 1/2 in) standard gauge
- Electrification: 750 V DC third rail

The Baumschulenweg–Neukölln link line is a railway line in southern Berlin. It connects the Ring line (Ringbahn) station of Neukölln via Köllnische Heide to Baumschulenweg on the Görlitz line. The line as originally designed only for freight but is now mainly used by Berlin S-Bahn trains.

== History ==
=== Installation and electrification ===
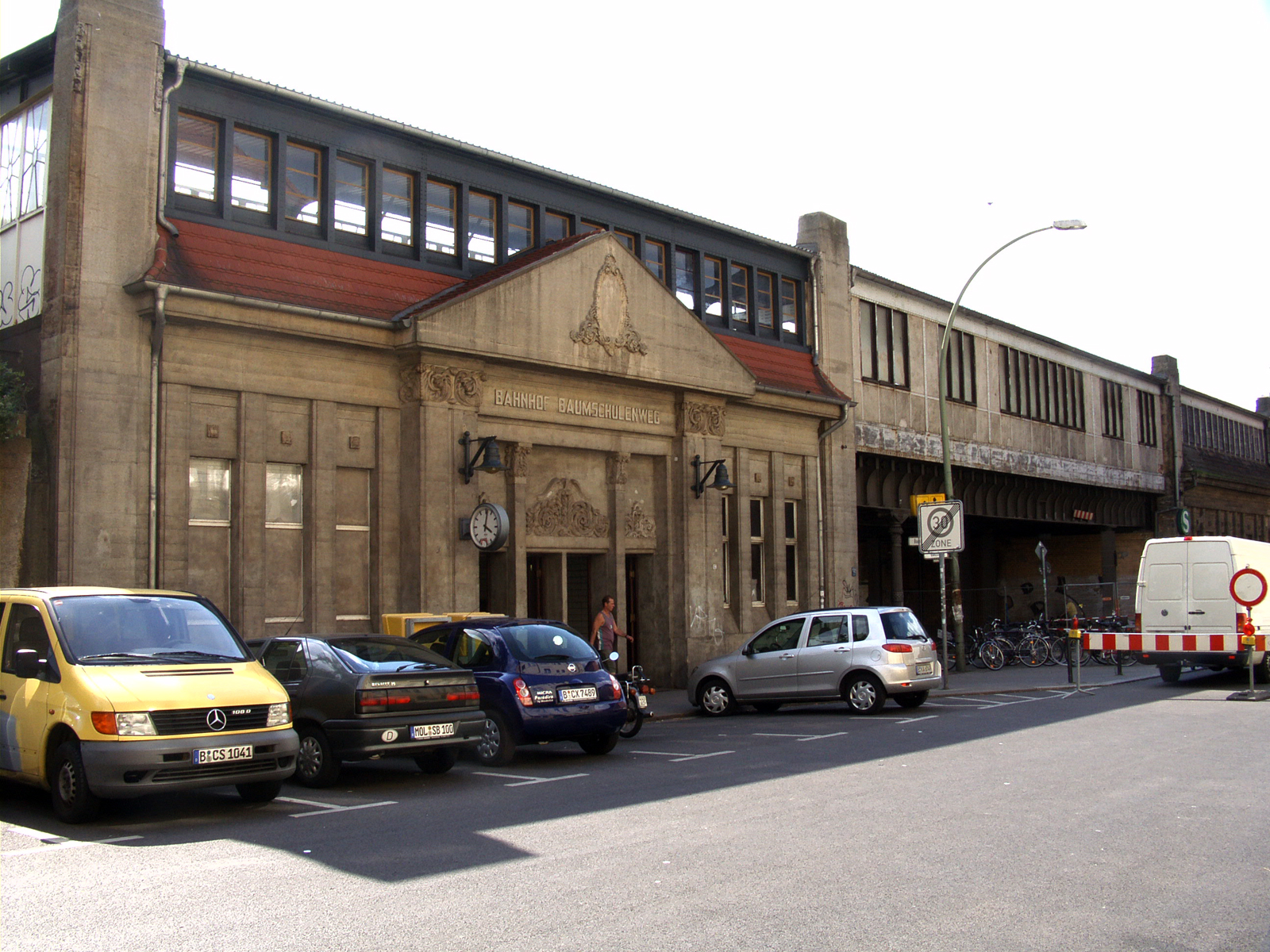
Baumschulenweg station

The line was built at ground level a single track between 1890 and 1896 and was opened on 8 June 1896. At first, it only served freight, connecting the Görlitz line with the southern Ring line.

Beginning in 1910, two separate suburban tracks were laid north of the existing freight track. The entire line was rebuilt on an embankment with bridges over intersecting roads, including Kaiser-Friedrich-Strasse (now Sonnenallee) and Kiefholzstraße. At the same time the trackwork was rebuilt around Baumschulenweg station. As part of the redevelopment Köllnische Heide station was built where the line crossed Kaiser-Friedrich-Strasse. Preliminary work began in 1913 and the platforms were completed three years later. Further work, including the building of the reception building, was delayed due to World War I. The station was finally opened on 16 August 1920.

On 6 November 1928 the suburban lines were electrified.

=== Germania plan ===
Following the Nazi seizure of power in 1933, it created plans to turn Berlin into its World Capital Germania. This gave greater importance to the Ring Bahn, so that it would be used by all suburban trains and act like a big roundabout. The link to the Görlitz line was assigned an important role, but especially for long-distance, regional and freight traffic. The line would be expanded to a total of eight tracks, two of which would still be reserved for the S-Bahn. Four tracks would have been the mainline tracks of the rerouted Görlitz line. The remaining pair of tracks would form part of a new route connecting with the Lower Silesian-Markish line at Köpenick.

Although the route is relatively short and the work would have been less time-consuming than other parts of the plan, only preliminary action work was done. After the end of World War II the line was restored with its original three tracks.

=== Berlin Wall and the division of the line ===
With the construction of the Berlin Wall on 13 August 1961 the line was closed about 270 metres beyond the station Köllnische Heide. While the trains on the Görlitz line in the following years simply continued towards Ostkreuz on the Ring line, in West Berlin trains reversed at Köllnische Heide. Only the northern track was operated between Köllnische Heide and Neukölln. In the late 1970s, the embankment on the northern side threatened to sag, causing the East German Railways to move operations on to the southern suburban track. This solution, however, only continued for a few years, as in early September 1980 both the Ring line and the short branch to Köllnische Heide were closed as a result of a strike by employees of the S-Bahn resident in West Berlin.

On the East Berlin side, the line gradually closed. Initially, only the first 200 metres across the border were affected. At the end of the 1980s the last tracks were removed. Only the underpass under the main line remained.

=== Reopening of the line after the fall of the Wall ===
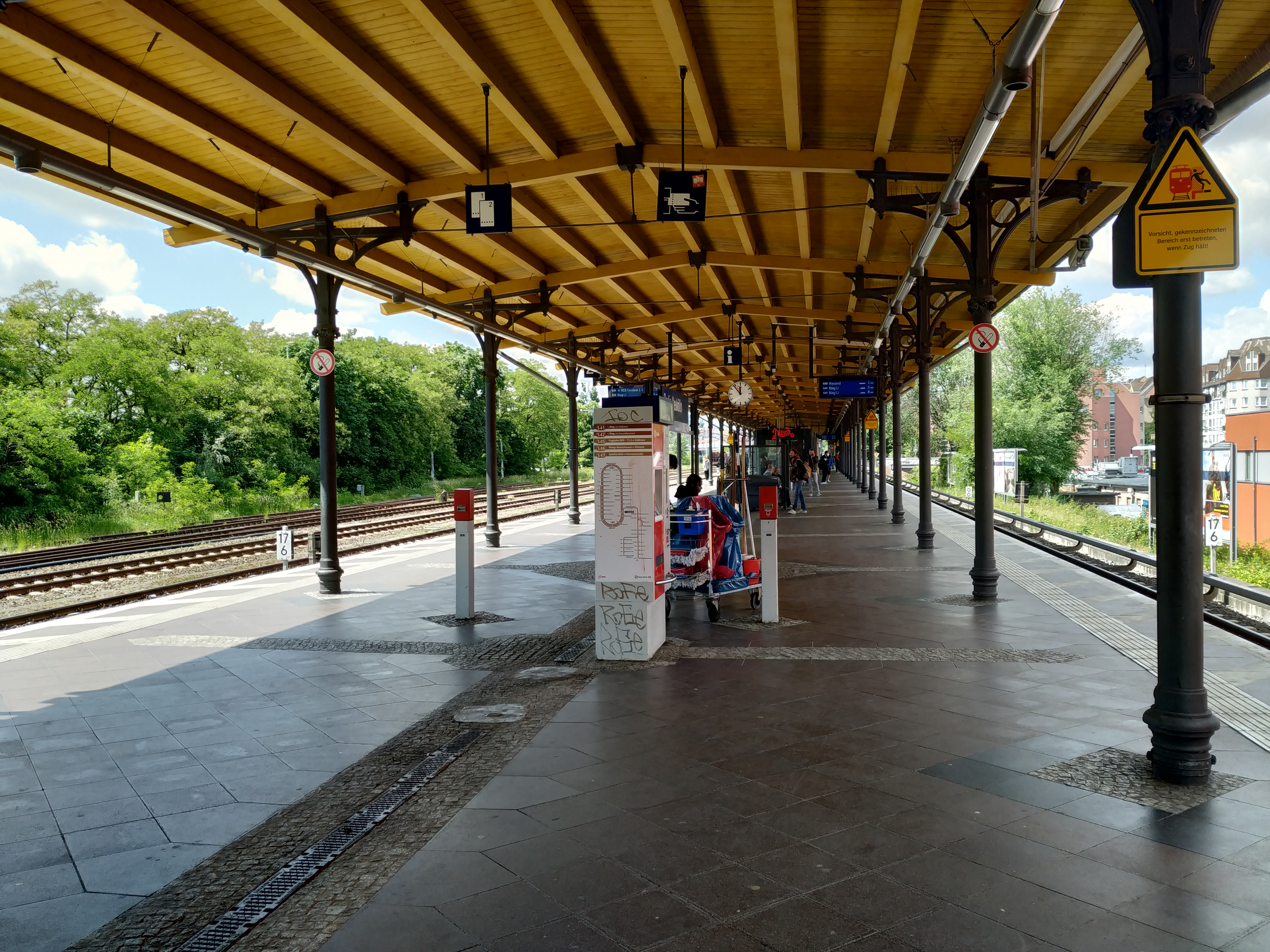
Trains run again from Neukölln station in 1993 on the line to Baumschulenweg

After Berliner Verkehrsbetriebe took over operation of the S-Bahn in West Berlin in 1984, initially only the rump operation on the Stadtbahn and on the Dresden line were maintained. Other lines were restored between 1984 and 1985 - Wannsee line, the North-South Tunnel and the Northern line.

The reopening of the southern section of the Ring line in the western part of Berlin was scheduled to start in 1991 since the BVG took over the operation of the S-Bahn in West Berlin in 1984. This has been depended on the pressure groups and the government who decided to bring forward owing to the response from the West Berlin commuters:

- There was popular pressure to bring it forward in 1988 and 1989.
- It was agreed to reopen the Ring line between Westend and Schöneberg by 1992 and extend it to Sonnenallee in 1994, when the Berlin government is changed before the fall of the Berlin Wall. After the start of this work, the Berlin Wall fell and the Germany is reunified.

This meant that it was now possible to extend the Ring line immediately to the east on the existing line. The Baumschulenweg–Neukölln link line was part of the first line to be put back into traffic. Construction began on 16 December 1990 for the section from Baumschulenweg to Köllnische Heide. The Neukölln to Treptower Park section of the Ring line followed later after the first part of the ring line is completed in 1994, because work was required at Treptower Park station. On 17 December 1993 the S-Bahn was reopened between Westend and Baumschulenweg via the link line and the southern Ring line. Approximately nine months later, freight traffic also returned to the line.

Traffic has now shifted in favour of the S-Bahn since 2002. Freight trains rarely run and then only at night.
