= Plänterwald railway station =

Railway station in Berlin, Germany

Plänterwald
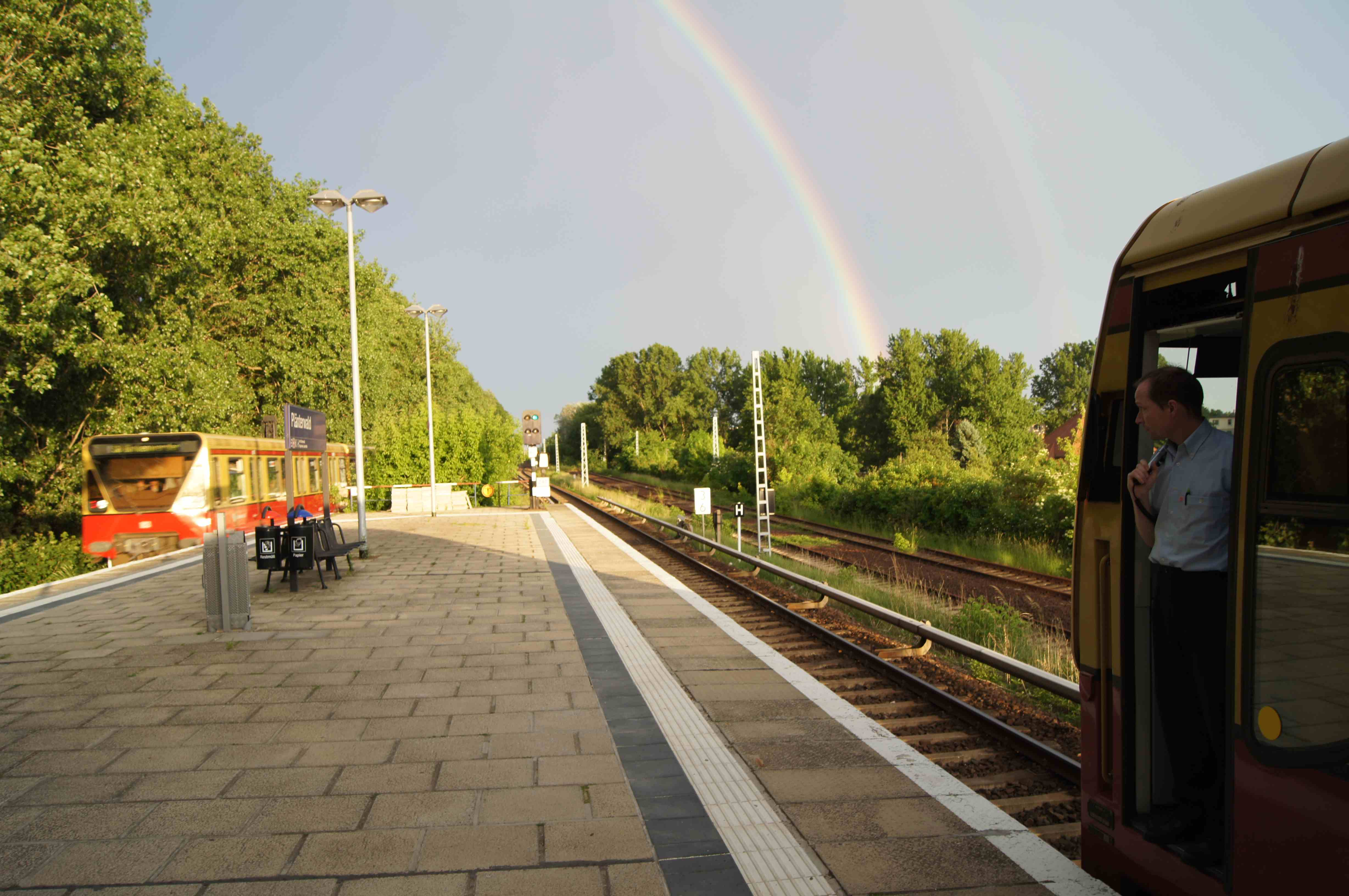
- 2011

General information
- Location: Treptow-Köpenick, Berlin, Berlin; Germany
- Coordinates: 52°28′43″N 13°28′24″E
- Owner: DB Netz
- Operator: DB Station&Service
- Lines: Berlin–Görlitz (KBS 200.45–9)
- Platforms: 1 island platform
- Tracks: 2
- Train operators: S-Bahn Berlin
- Connections: 165 166 377

Other information
- Station code: 4950
- DS100 code: BPWA
- Category: 4
- Fare zone: VBB: Berlin B/5656
- Website: www.bahnhof.de

History
- Opened: 3 June 1956; 70 years ago

Services
| Preceding station | Berlin S-Bahn | Following station |
|---|---|---|
| Treptower Park towards Birkenwerder | S8 | Baumschulenweg towards Wildau |
| Treptower Park towards Waidmannslust | S85 | Baumschulenweg towards Grünau |
| Treptower Park towards Spandau | S9 | Baumschulenweg towards BER Airport |
Location

Berlin-Plänterwald is a railway station in the Treptow-Köpenick district of Berlin. It is served by the S-Bahn lines S8, S85 and S9.

== Notable places nearby ==
- Archenhold Observatory
- Treptower Park
- Spreepark
- Soviet War Memorial (Treptower Park)
