= S8 (Berlin) =

Train line of the Berlin S-Bahn

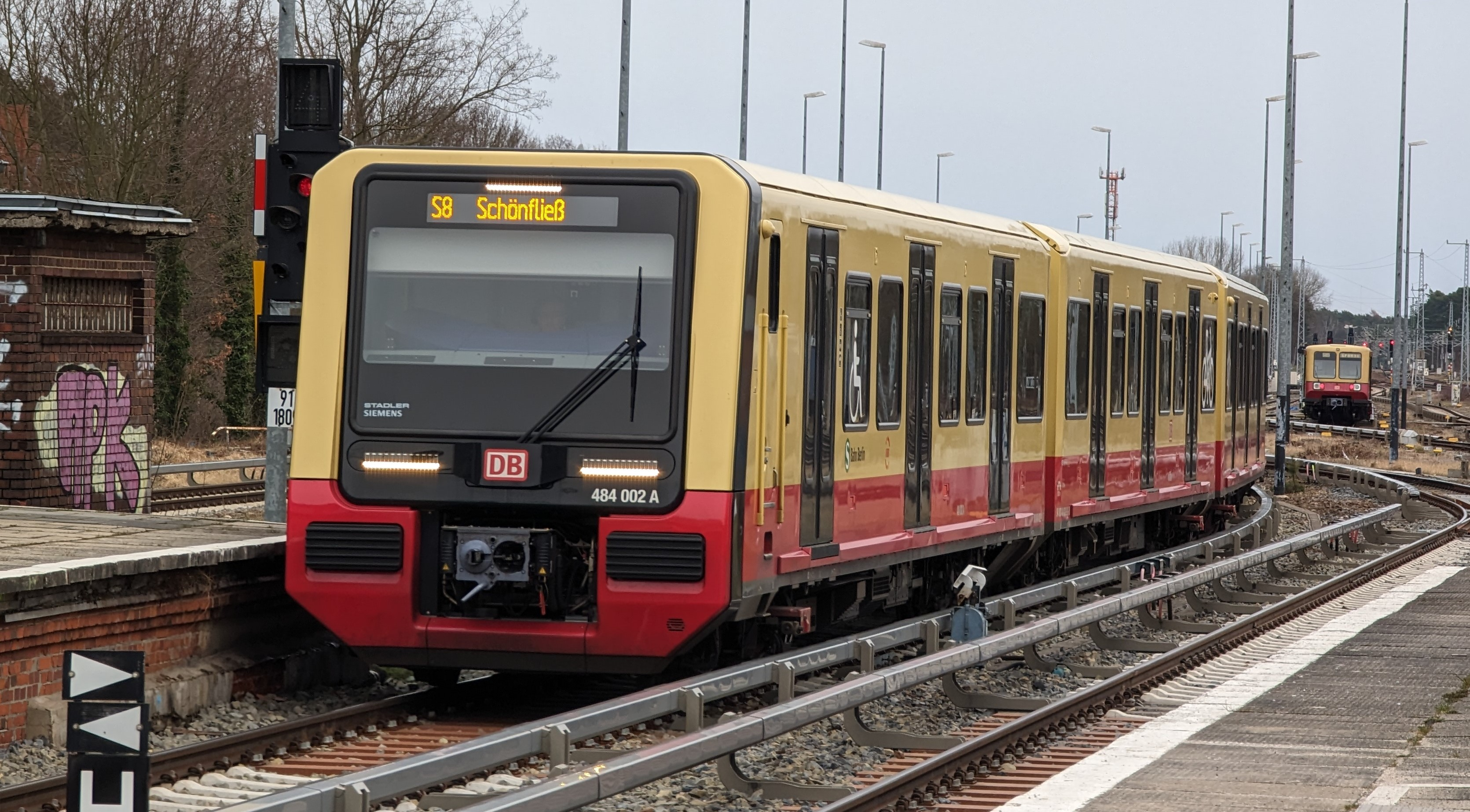

Overview
- Locale: Berlin

Service
- System: Berlin S-Bahn
- Operator(s): S-Bahn Berlin GmbH
- Rolling stock: DBAG Class 483; DBAG Class 484

Technical
- Electrification: 750 V DC Third rail

S8 is a line on the Berlin S-Bahn. It operates from Wildau to Birkenwerder over:

- the Görlitz line, opened in 1866 and electrified in 1929,
- the Ring line, completed in 1877 and electrified in 1926,
- the Outer ring, completed on 22 November 1952 and electrified for the S-Bahn in 1962,
- and a short section of the Prussian Northern line, opened on 10 July 1877 and electrified on 8 August 1925.

== Service history ==
The S8 was created on 2 June 1991, as a slightly shorter replacement of the Lime Green route of the East Berlin S-Bahn between Bernau bei Berlin and Grünau (via the eastern part of the Ringbahn).

== In popular culture ==
An S8 train to Zeuthen appears in the opening frames of Pet Shop Boys' music video for the single Leaving from the album Elysium (2012).

== Gallery ==
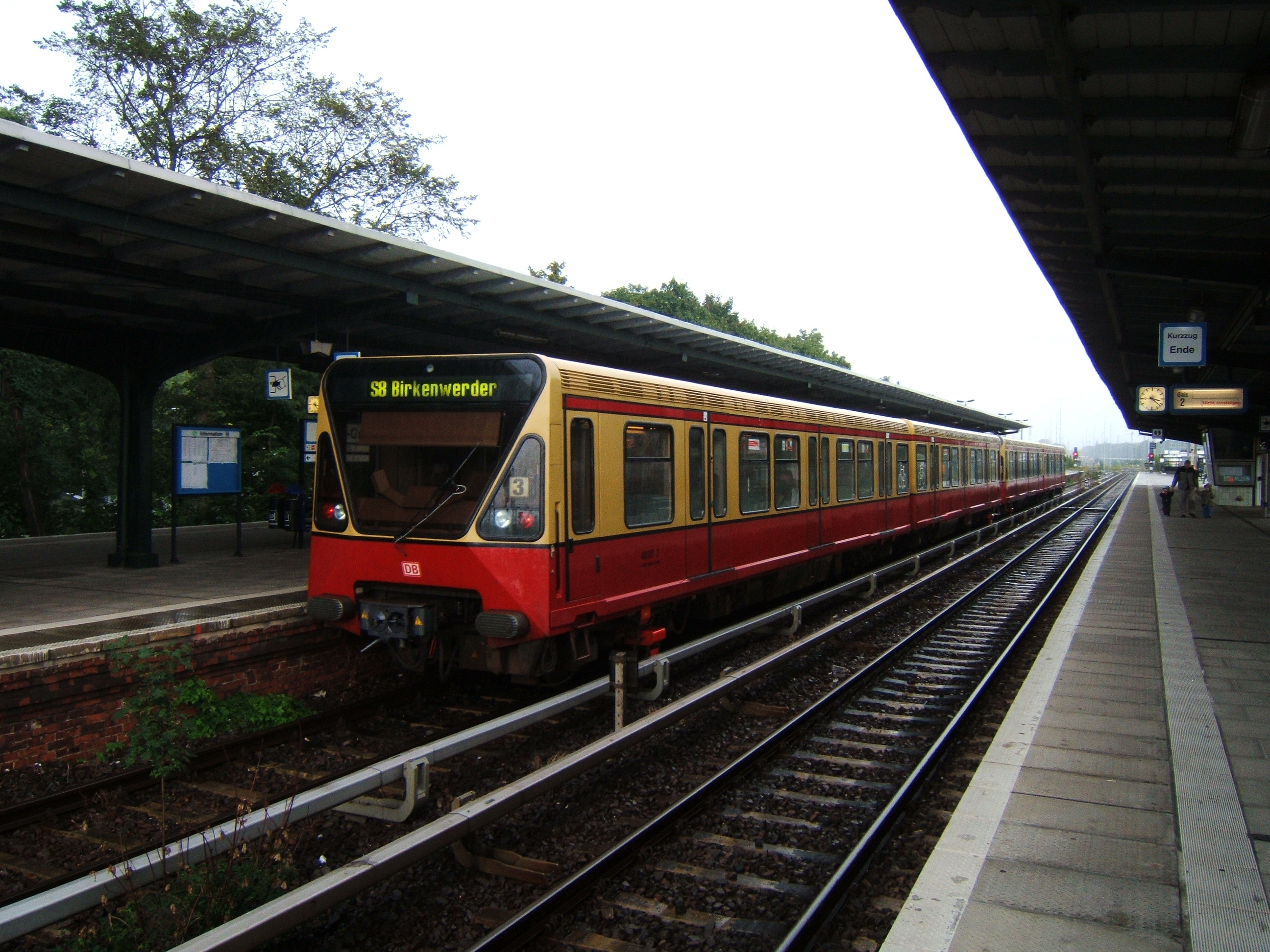
S8 at Grünau

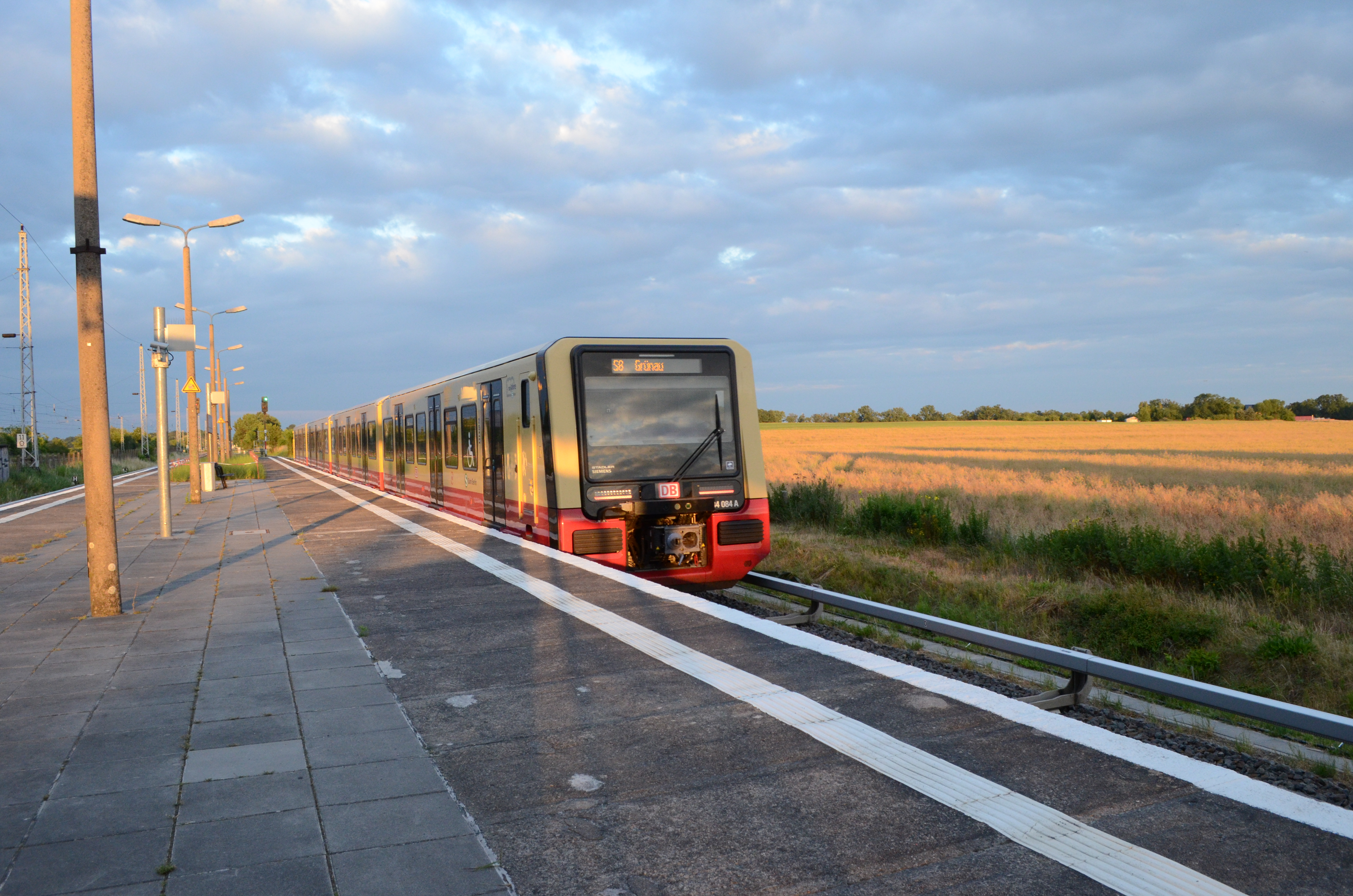
Train of DBAG Class 483/484 at Schönfließ station on S8

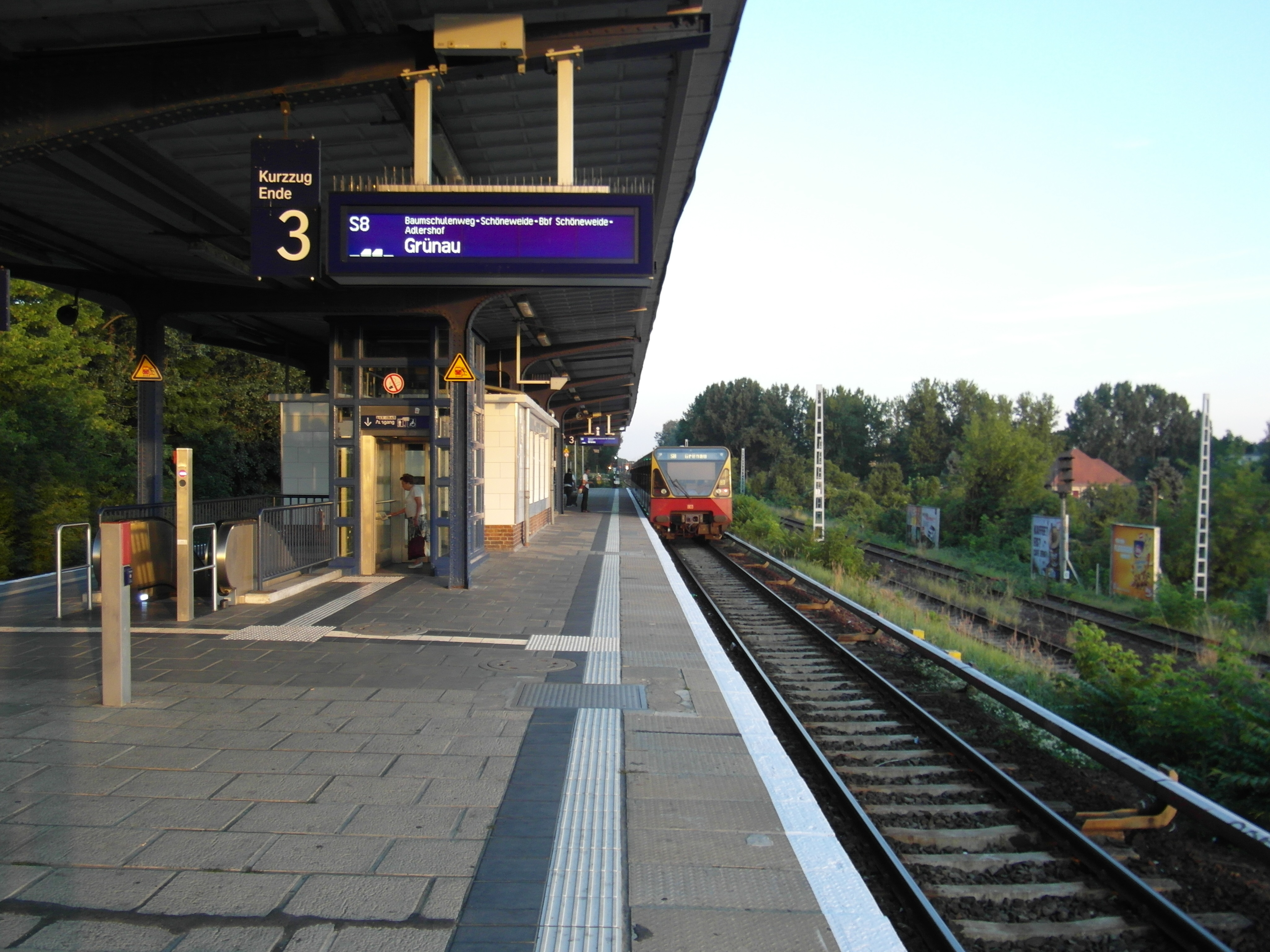
S8 at Plänterwald

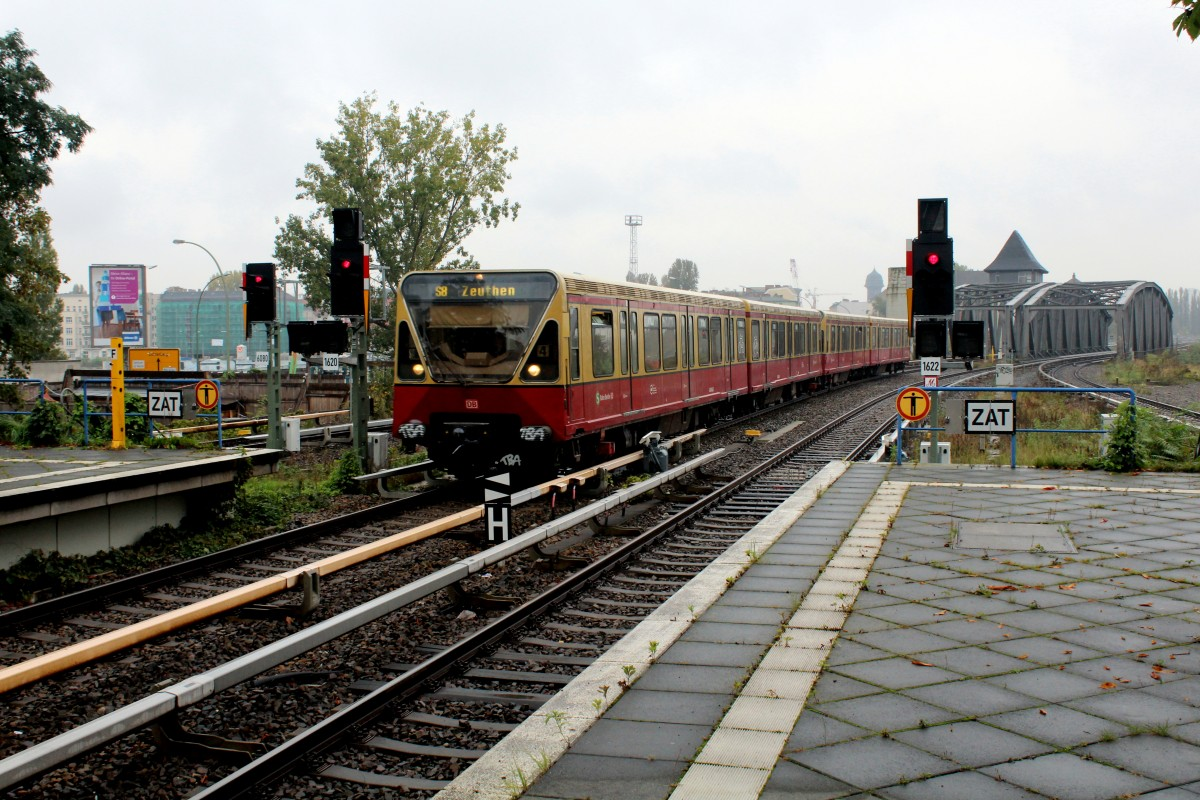
S8 at Treptower Park
