= Berlin Hermannstraße station =

Railway station in Berlin, Germany

Coordinates: 52.468°N 13.431°E

Hermannstraße
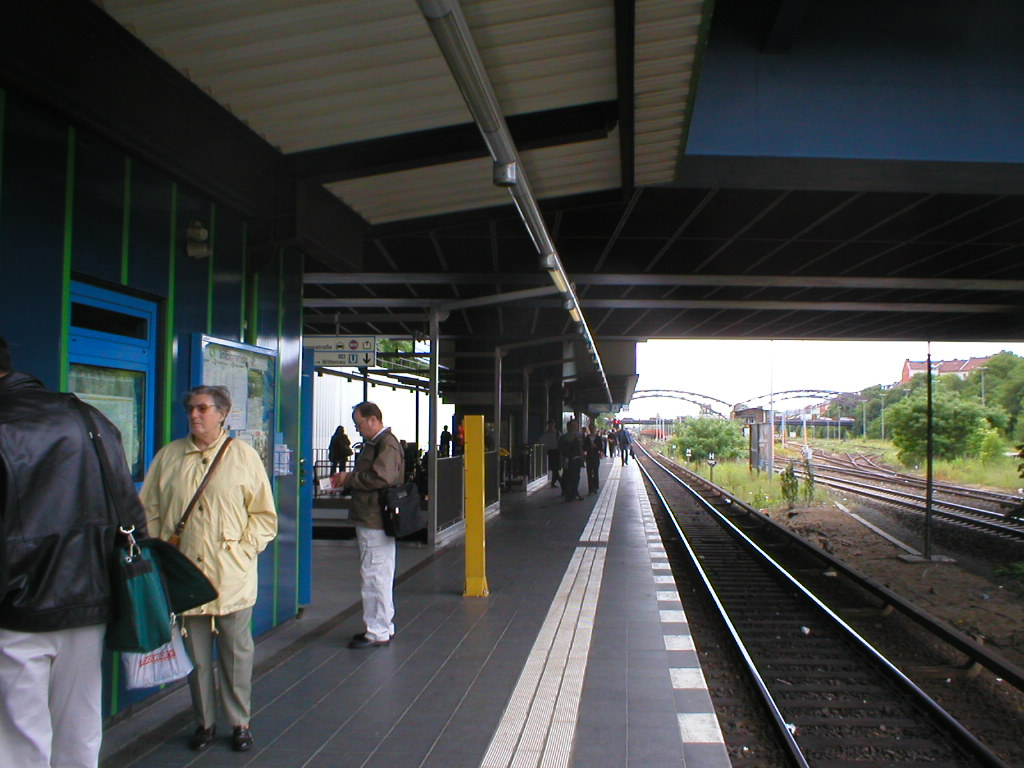
- 2004

General information
- Owner: DB Netz
- Operator: DB Station&Service
- Platforms: 1 island platform
- Tracks: 2
- Train operators: S-Bahn Berlin

Construction
- Accessible: yes

Other information
- Station code: 2716
- DS100 code: BHER
- IBNR: 8089105
- Category: 4
- Fare zone: VBB: Berlin A/5555

Services
Preceding station	Berlin S-Bahn	Following station
Neukölln One-way operation	S41	Tempelhof Ringbahn (clockwise)
Neukölln Ringbahn (counter-clockwise)	S42	Tempelhof One-way operation
Tempelhof towards Südkreuz	S45	Neukölln towards BER Airport
Tempelhof towards Westend	S46	Neukölln towards Königs Wusterhausen
Terminus	S47	Neukölln towards Spindlersfeld
Preceding station	Berlin U-Bahn	Following station
Leinestraße towards Wittenau	U8	Terminus
Location

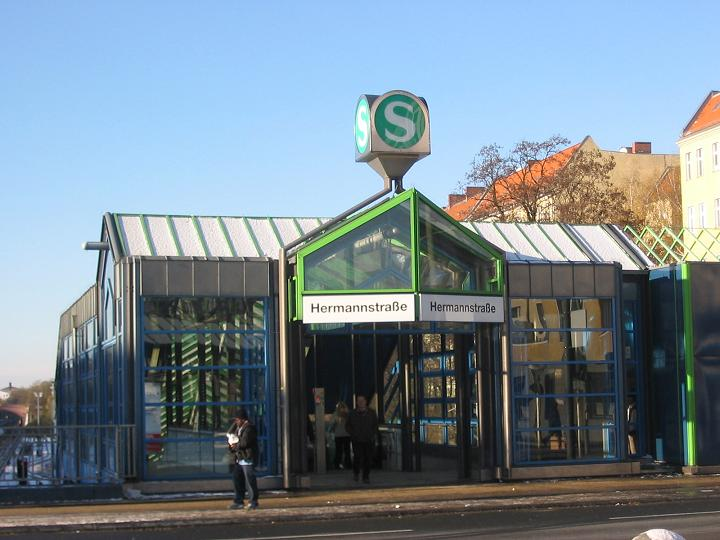
Entrance to the Hermannstraße S-Bahn station

Berlin Hermannstraße is a railway station in the Neukölln district of Berlin. It is served by the S-Bahn lines S41, S42, S45, S46 and S47 and the U-Bahn line U8, of which it is the southern terminus. It was formerly also possible to transfer there to the Neukölln-Mittenwalde railway line, which is now only used for goods traffic.

== S-Bahn station ==
=== Berlin Ringbahn ===
Hermannstraße was on the route of the first segment of the Berlin Ringbahn which opened on 15 November 1877 (with passenger service beginning on 1 January 1878). At that time the closest station was Rixdorf, which today is called Berlin-Neukölln because the locality changed its name in 1912. The Hermannstraße station opened on 1 February 1899, as one of several suburban stations added during the enlargement of the ring line to 4 tracks.

Initially the only access was at the east end of the station, via a small building with a red-tiled roof. In 1910 a second entrance on Siegfriedstraße was added. For 29 years the station was served by steam trains. After the creation of Greater Berlin in 1920, electrification to create the S-Bahn system began in 1924; the Ringbahn was fully incorporated on 6 November 1928.

=== Rixdorf - Mittenwalde Railway ===
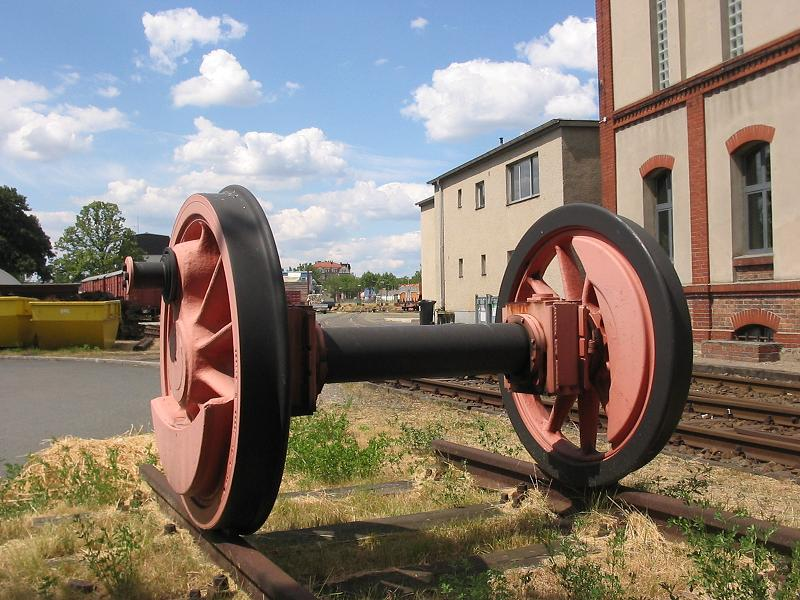
Teltow Canal goods depot on the Neukölln - Mittenwalde Railway, near Berlin Sanitation's Gradestraße depot

In 1895 a committee of residents of Mittenwalde formed a committee to construct a railway from Mittenwalde to Rixdorf, since existing rail routes were not conveniently located. Finding the cost prohibitive, they partnered with Vering & Waechter, a company which was at the time developing rail lines throughout Germany. On 23 February 1899, the Rixdorf-Mittenwalder Eisenbahn Aktiengesellschaft was founded; it still exists today. Vering & Waechter, given the responsibility for planning and construction, mapped out a 27 km (17 mi) route from North Mittenwalde to Hermannstraße with 7 intermediate stations: Brusendorf, Groß Kienitz, Selchow, Schönefeld, Rudow, Buckow and Britz. After the Ringbahn station was built, the plans were changed and the Hermannstraße terminus of the line became a transfer point and the Britz station the operating centre.

The operating licence for the line was granted on 21 July 1899, and it opened on 28 September 1900. 4 years later it was extended southwards to Schöneiche Plan. When Rixdorf became Neukölln in 1912, the line became the Neukölln-Mittenwalder Eisenbahn (Neukölln - Mittenwalde Railway).

=== During and after World War II ===
During World War II the Mittenwalde line was heavily used for transporting both munitions and passengers, reaching a peak of over 1 million tonnes and 3 million passengers in 1942/43.

The Hermannstraße S-Bahn station was not damaged during the bombing of Berlin, but the entrance was severely damaged during the Battle for Berlin and that stretch of the Ringbahn was closed from April 1945 until 18 June 1945.

The Mittenwalde line was closed until 17 May 1945, when the bridge over the Teltow Canal was repaired by the Red Army. In September 1946, the Soviet occupying administration took possession of the portion of the line outside Berlin under eminent domain and transferred its operation to the Brandenburg State Railways, and in the Berlin Blockade of 1948/49, the line was severed at the boundary with the American sector. 11.5 km (7.1 mi) of line with some sidings within Berlin remained unaffected, and the company had constructed a 5 km (3.1 mi) extension to Tempelhof Airfield which could then be used to transport coal flown there in the Berlin Airlift, avoiding the East Berlin-controlled Deutsche Reichsbahn.

S-Bahn operation continued under the control of the Deutsche Reichsbahn during and after the blockade, but was boycotted in West Berlin in protest against this East German body operating in the Western sectors of the city. In 1961, the year Berlin wall was erected, the Siegfriedstraße entrance to the Hermannstraße station was closed. The destroyed main entrance was under restoration until 1968/69, but in 1971 was demolished and replaced with a modern building, which opened in June 1973; the Siegfriedstraße entrance, reopened during this work, was then closed and it was demolished 3 years later. After the September 1980 strike of West Berlin S-Bahn workers, the Reichsbahn almost completely closed the S-Bahn in West Berlin, including the Ringbahn.

The Neukölln - Mittenwalde line, in contrast, profited from increased goods traffic after the West Berlin power company, Bewag, built a power plant at Rudow. Within the city, its passenger stations were demolished, while outside the city, in the GDR, the rails were taken up but the station buildings remained.

=== Reopening after reunification ===
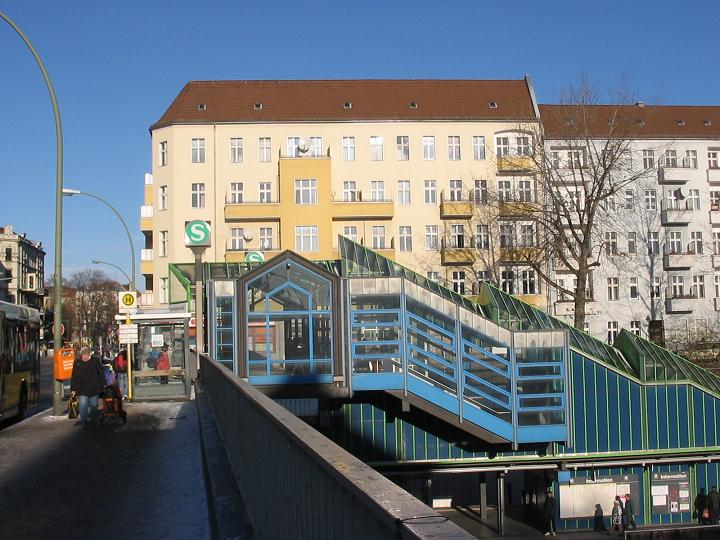
New S-Bahn station from Hermannstraße bridge

The Reichsbahn transferred the S-Bahn to Berliner Verkehrsbetriebe (Berlin Transport) in 1984, and after public enthusiasm for it increased, preparations began in 1989 for gradually reopening the Ringbahn beginning in 1992.

The fall of the Berlin Wall that November and the ensuing German reunification changed the plans: the stretch of Ringbahn to be initially reopened was extended into the former East Berlin and the reopening deferred to 1993. The Hermannstraße station was completely rebuilt in a new position under the bridge where Hermannstraße crosses the S-Bahn cutting, so that hardly any traces of the historic station remain. The new station has two entrance buildings on Hermannstraße, which were painted blue and green to draw attention to the connection between the S-Bahn and U-Bahn Line 8 at the station, which was finally realised after some 60 years with the opening of the U-Bahn station on 13 July 1996.

Service on the western portion of the Ringbahn was ceremonially relaunched on 17 December 1993, over a stretch of line including the Hermannstraße station. The station is now served by three S-Bahn lines which originate to the southeast of the city: S47, S46 from Königs Wusterhausen and S45 from Schönefeld Airport, plus the two Ringbahn lines, S41 and S42. A new two-track turning area at Hermannstraße is the terminus of the S47.

Also since German reunification, the Mittenwalde line became the route by which the city's household waste is conveyed in containers from the Berliner Stadtreinigung (Berlin Sanitation) depot on the Teltow Canal to the Hermannstraße terminus of the line, now known as Güterbahnhof Neukölln, Neukölln Goods Station, where it is transferred to Deutsche Bahn goods trains. In December 2005, however, the district of Neukölln decided to convert unused track area in the goods station to industrial use; the Neukölln-Mittenwalder Eisenbahn is to wind up its operations there at some point in the future. It was supposed to be a regional railway station but plans were scrapped.

== U-Bahn station ==
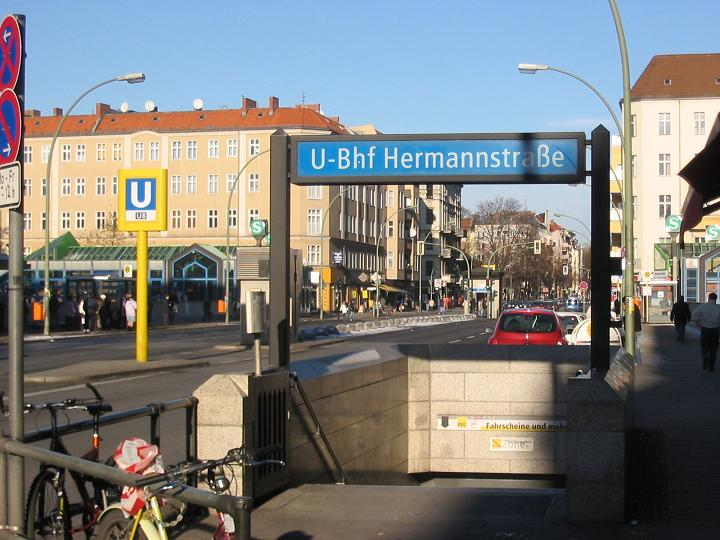
U-Bahn entrance; S-Bahn entrances in rear

In 1927, seven years after Neukölln like many other surrounding towns became part of Greater Berlin, the city opened the first segment of what was then called Line D of the U-Bahn, today's U8. Over the next 3 years, the line was extended as far south as Leinestraße. It had been the intention since the first conception of the line in 1910 for it to connect with the S-Bahn at Hermannstraße. Work began in 1929 and was scheduled to be completed in March 1930, but was halted by the economic crisis. Finally in 1931 the City of Berlin cancelled the project. By then the tunnel from Leinestraße (the longest tunnel segment excavated that year) and about one third of the platform at the new station had been constructed. The stairways to the street were in place and were capped with concrete.

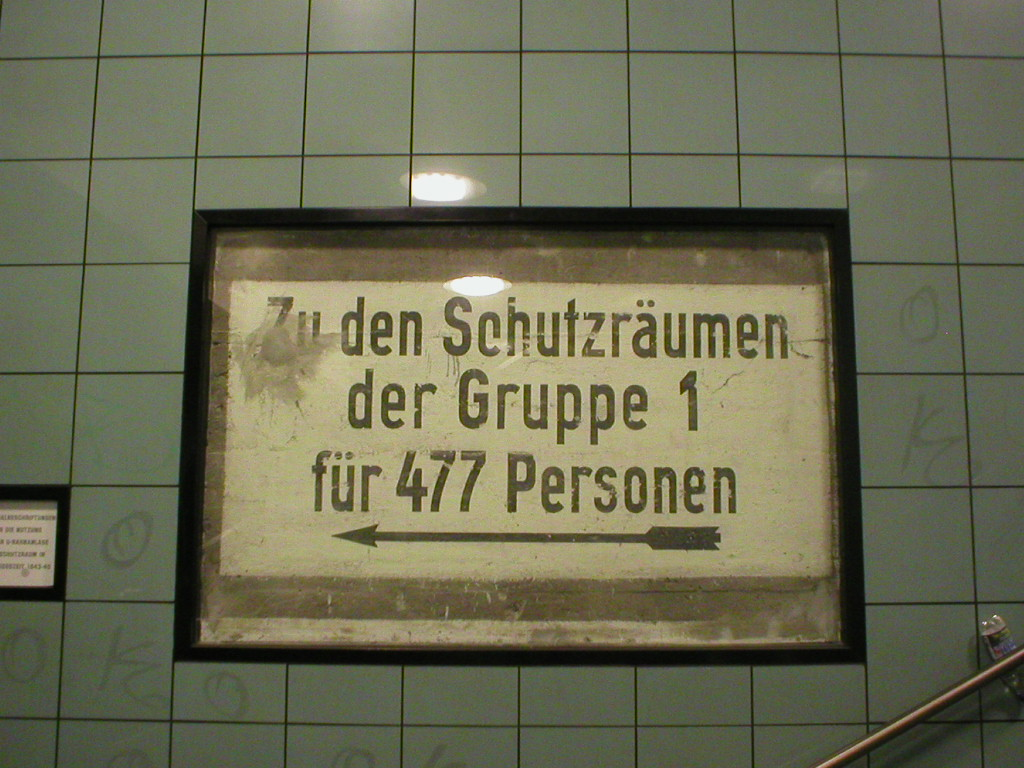
During the Second World War, the Hermannstraße U-Bahn station was used as an air raid shelter

In 1940, the unfinished station was used as an air raid shelter; because it is located under the S-Bahn cutting, it is unusually deep underground. There are still signs on the wall from this period. After the construction of the Berlin wall in 1961, the West Berlin Senate did not pursue the plans for an extension, since West Berliners were boycotting the GDR-run S-Bahn and there was thus no longer demand for a transfer point between the U-Bahn and it. Berlin Transport laid rails in the tunnel and used it to store disused trains.

The situation changed with German reunification and it was decided to complete the extension and open the Hermannstraße U-Bahn station. The scheduled reopening of the Ringbahn on 17 December 1993 created time pressure, because work on the U-Bahn station had to begin before then. The work included renovation of the existing tunnel and partial platform, construction of the remainder of the platform and the creation of a 320 m long turn-around. In addition, means of transfer between the station and the S-Bahn station above had to be created, and stairwells for a planned regional station. In the course of the work, the trains which had been parked there in the 1960s were discovered. U-Bahn buffs were delighted that one of the discoveries was an antique BI train.

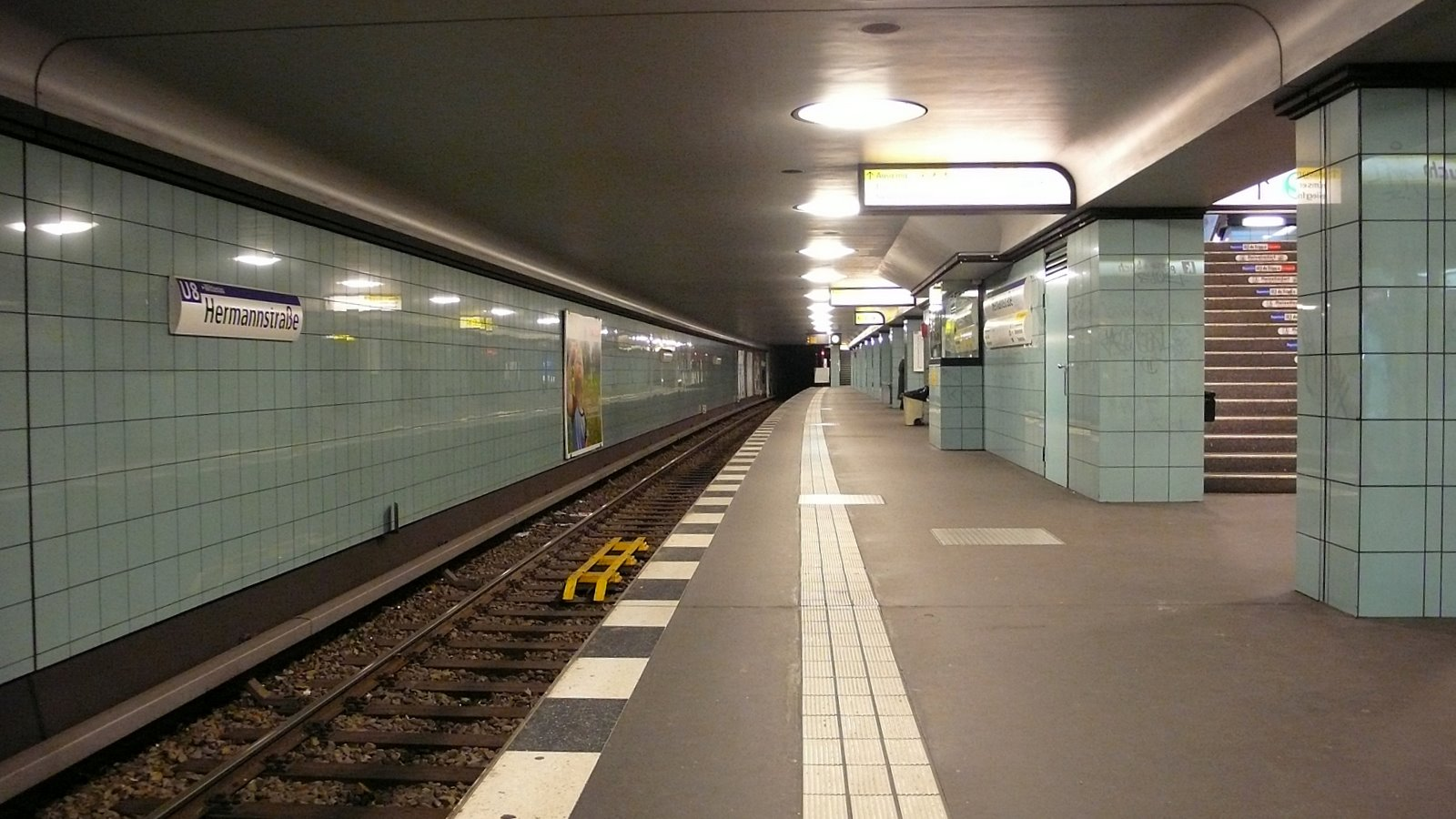
Platform view

The opening of the station, the 168th in the Berlin U-Bahn system, was celebrated on 13 July 1996. Like almost all Berlin U-Bahn stations constructed in recent decades, the Hermannstraße station was designed by Rainer Rümmler. It was his last design before he retired. In this case he was strongly influenced by the stations to the north, designed by Alfred Grenander, which led to a very sparse station lined with turquoise tiles. The signs for the air raid shelter were retained behind glass as testaments to the past.

== 2016 manhunt after crime at station ==
A video clip from October 2016 showed a woman being kicked down stairs; in December the clip was published by media before being authorized by the government to do so; thereafter police requested leads from the public to capture the perpetrator of the violence. On 13 December an arrest warrant was issued. On 17 December the suspect was arrested in Germany on a bus coming from another country.
