= Berlin–Görlitz railway =

Railway line in Germany

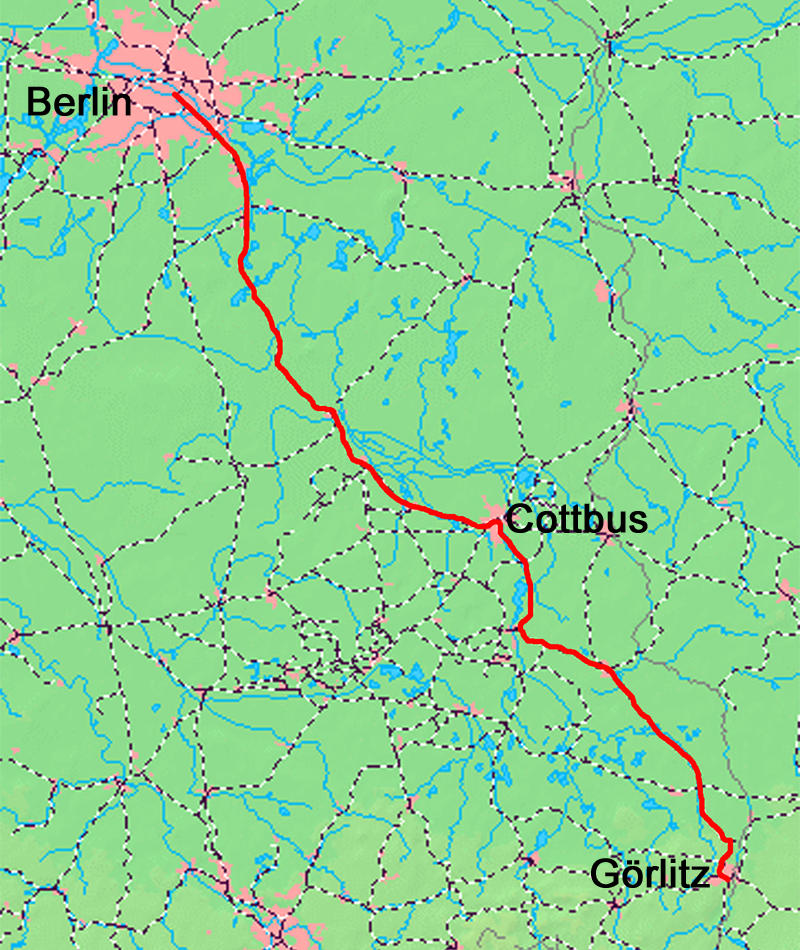

Overview
- Line number: 6142
- Locale: Berlin, Brandenburg and Saxony, Germany

Service
- Route number: 202 Berlin–Cottbus; 220 Cottbus–Görlitz

Technical
- Line length: 207.9 km (129.2 mi)
- Track gauge: 1,435 mm (4 ft 8 1/2 in)
- Electrification: Berlin–Cottbus:15 kV/16.7 Hz AC overhead catenary; Berlin–Königs Wusterhausen: 750 V DC third rail
- Operating speed: 160 kilometres per hour (99 mph)K. Wusterhausen–ca. km 112 near Cottbus; 120 kilometres per hour (75 mph)

The Berlin–Görlitz railway is a main line railway in the German states of Berlin, Brandenburg and Saxony, which was originally built and operated by the Berlin-Görlitz Railway Company (Berlin-Görlitzer Eisenbahn-Gesellschaft). The line runs through Lusatia from Berlin via Cottbus to Görlitz. It is one of the oldest lines in Germany, opened in 1866 and 1867.

It was nationalised in 1882 and became part of Prussian state railways. In 1920, it became part of German national railways along with the rest of the Prussian state railways.

== Route ==
The line runs from Berlin via Königs Wusterhausen, Lübben, Cottbus, Spremberg, Weißwasser and Horka to Görlitz. The route originally began in Berlin from Görlitz station, a terminal station that was demolished in 1962. Today, the line starts at the Berlin Stadtbahn and the Ringbahn and passes through the southeastern landscapes of the Spreewald and Lower Lusatia to the railway junction of Görlitz.

The line is double-tracked only from Berlin to Lübbenau. It is electrified on this section and beyond to Cottbus. In the area of Königs Wusterhausen station there is only one through track available for trains running in both directions.

The line continues past Görlitz as the Neisse Valley Railway (Neißetalbahn) towards Zittau, including the Zittau–Hagenwerder railway. Until 1945, the line continued to Seidenberg (now Zawidów), which was on the border of Prussia and Austria-Hungary until 1918.

== History ==
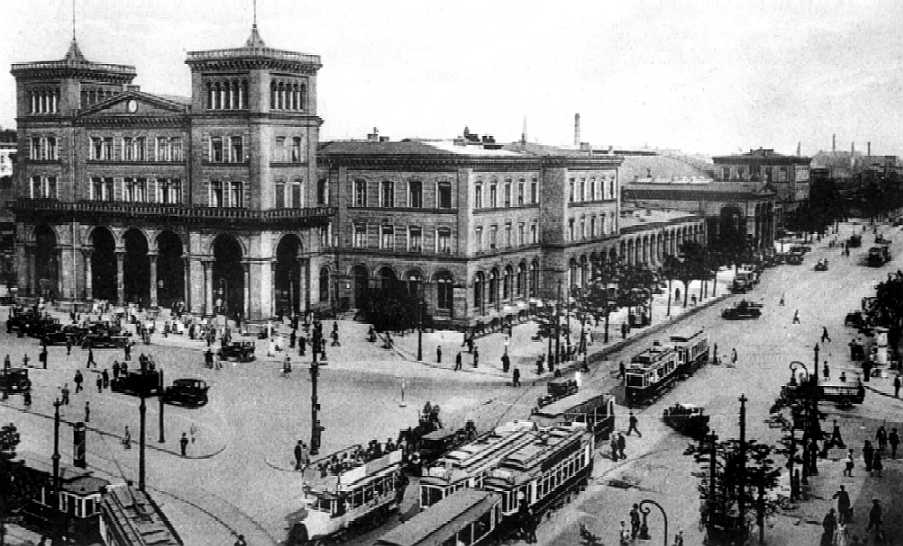
Berlin Görlitzer Bahnhof in 1928

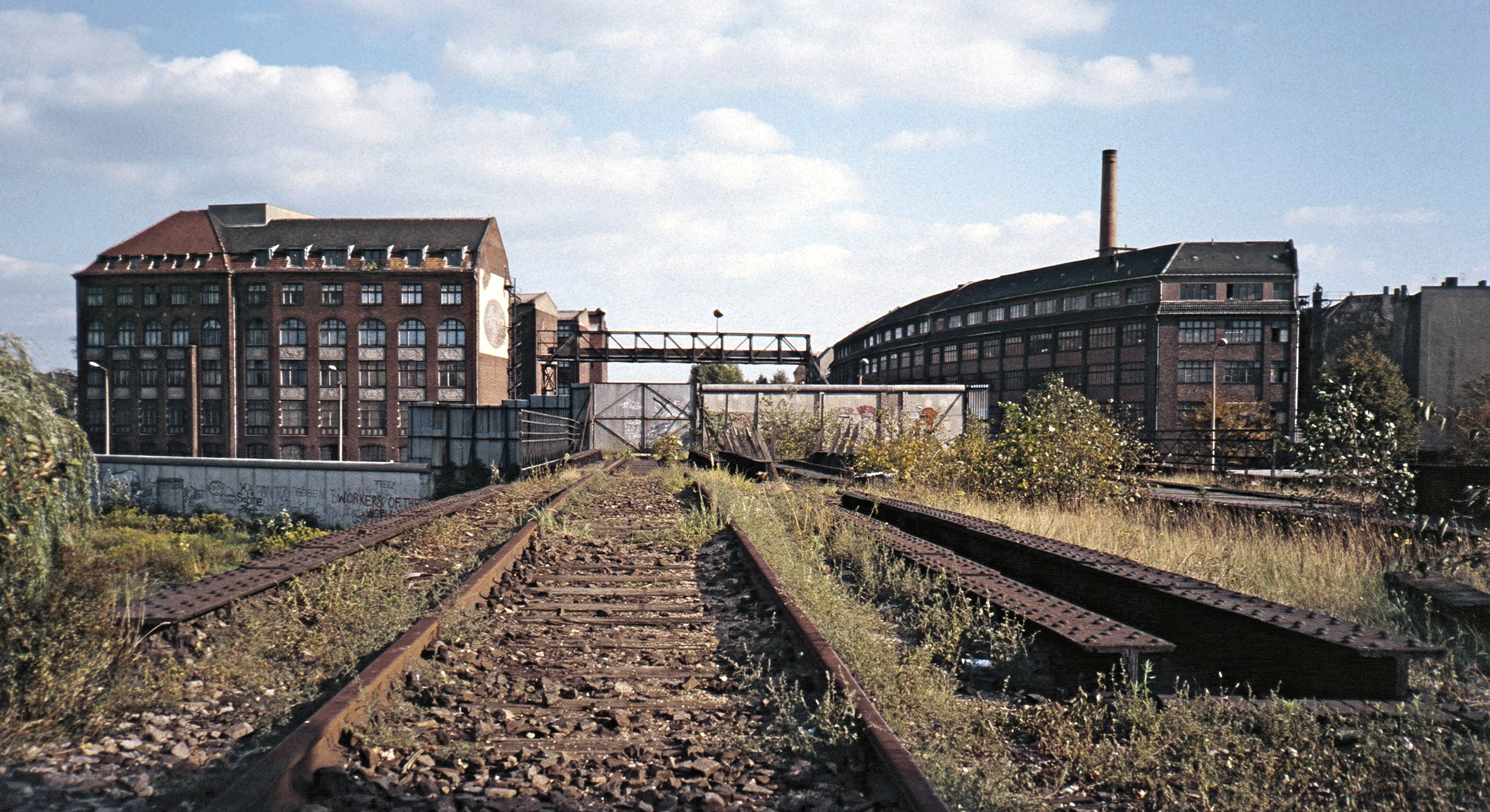
Berlin Görlitzer Bahnhof: gate for freight trains and inspection bridge of the GDR border guards, 1986

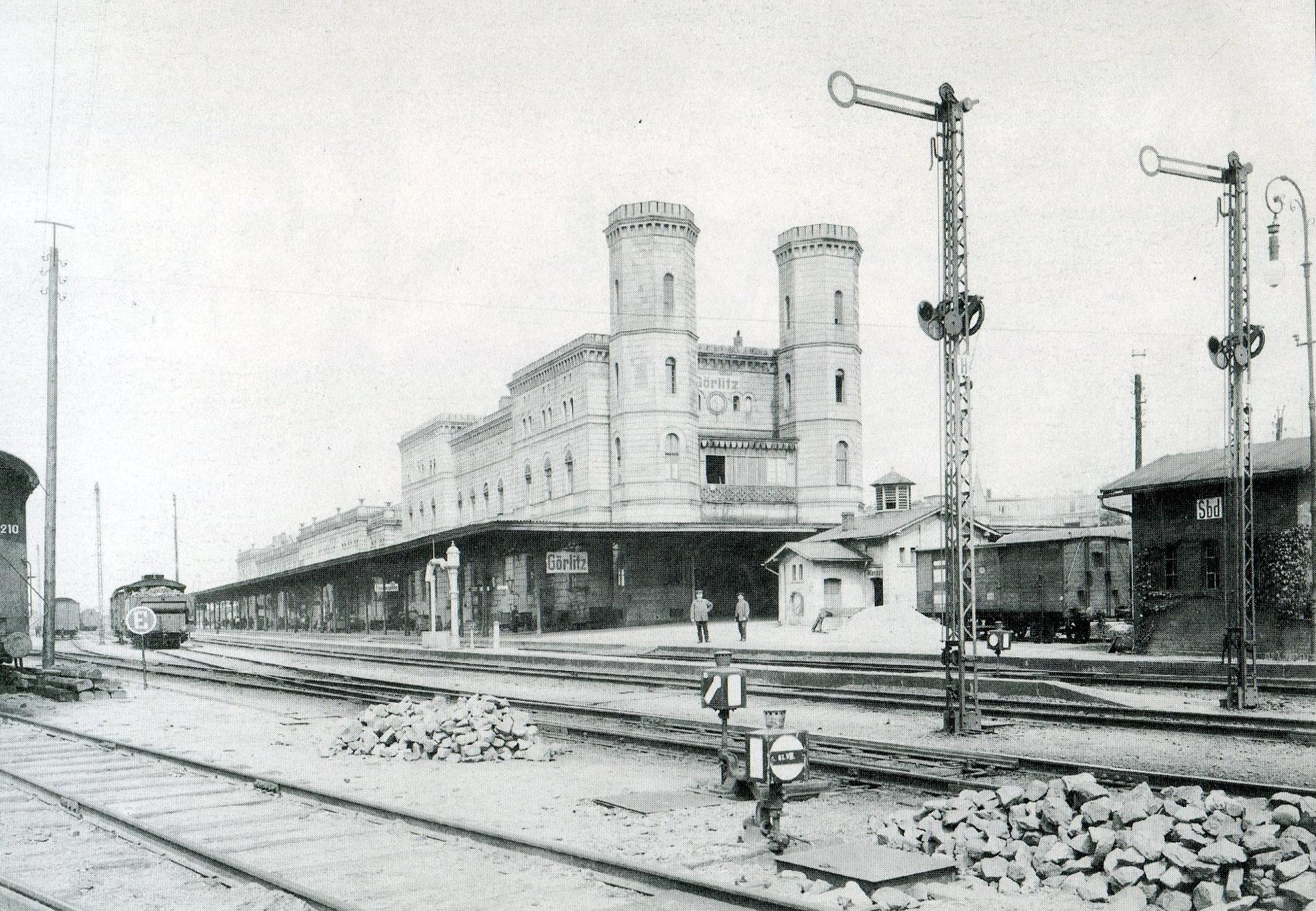
The old entrance building in Görlitz

The line was built by the "railway king" Bethel Henry Strousberg as general contractor and opened in 1866 and 1867 for passenger and freight transport. In 1882 it was nationalised by Prussia and became part of the Prussian state railways.

In 1896, Ausstellung ("exhibition") station was established at kilometre 2.7. It had five tracks, including three bay platform tracks, at four platforms. It was built especially for carrying the public to and from the Great Industrial Exposition of Berlin and closed after the end of the exposition.

On 7 August 1905, there an error by a dispatcher, leading to two trains crashing head-on between Spremberg and Schleife causing the death of 19 people and seriously injuring 40 others.

Around 1906, the entire railway line of the Görlitzer Bahn was raised in the Berlin area to remove level crossings. As part of this work, additional tracks were laid in Berlin between the Stadtbahn and Ringbahn and Grünau to cope with heavy suburban traffic. The stations in the Berlin city area received additional platforms on these suburban tracks, the platforms in Zeuthen (1897, formerly Hankels Ablage) and Eichwalde (1898) were relocated to the suburban tracks. In 1929, these lines were electrified with side-contact third rail and later became part of the Berlin S-Bahn network. In 1951, the S-Bahn tracks were extended to Königs Wusterhausen.

One of the two railway tracks was dismantled after 1945 to provide reparations. The gradual replacement of the second track began from 1970, but the vast majority of the line over a length of 112.9 km between Lübbenau and Görlitz is still single-track.

In 1952, Görlitz station in Berlin was closed for passenger traffic, although freight traffic continued to operate there until 1986. In 1988, the mainline tracks from Berlin Grünau Cross to Lübbenau were electrified with overhead catenary on the 15 kV 16.7 AC system and, in 1989, the catenary was extended to Cottbus.

In February 2010, the double-track, electrified eastern connection of the new Berlin Brandenburg Airport (BER) gained planning approval and was completed just a year later. It connects with the Görlitz railway over a single-track northern and a single-track southern connecting curve at level junctions between Eichwalde and Grünau. The old freight track to the tank farm at Berlin-Schönefeld Airport South (Kerosinbahn, "jet fuel"—not "kerosene"—railway), which began at Grünau station, was taken out of service at the end of March 2011 and subsequently dismantled. Since then, operations to the tank farm and the BER concrete plant have been carried out on the new tracks from the eastern connection; the siding branches off west of the A 113 and is electrified to the transfer yard.

By a decision of 23 July 2012, the Federal Railway Authority declared a 4.5 hectares (11 acres) area, in the district of Treptow-Köpenick, located between track-kilometre 0.9 and 2.2, to be free of rail operations. This is the section between Landwehr Canal and the Ringbahn area, including the former south curve.

== Upgrade of the line ==
The shortest travel time from Görlitz to Berlin for express trains was 3 hours 19 minutes in 1900, 3 hours 8 minutes in 1941 and 2 hours 41 minutes today with a change in Cottbus.

=== Berlin–Görlitz upgraded line ===
The upgrade of the line is listed as a priority requirement in the Federal Transport Infrastructure Plan 2003 (Bundesverkehrswegeplan). The ABS Berlin–Görlitz (Berlin–Görlitz upgraded line) project envisages doubling the track between Lübbenau and Cottbus, the increase of the line speed to 160 km/h (99 mph) and the electrification of the Cottbus–Görlitz section at an estimated cost of €237.9 million.

In 2008, the Lübbenau–Cottbus subsection was rebuilt to allow operations at 160 km/h (99 mph). A computer-based interlocking was installed in Vetschau, which is connected to the Lübbenau electronic control centre. This was followed at the end of November 2010 by another electronic interlocking in Cottbus, the cost of which amounted to approximately €50 million. It replaced 13 old interlockings and is remotely-controlled by the operations centre in Berlin-Pankow.

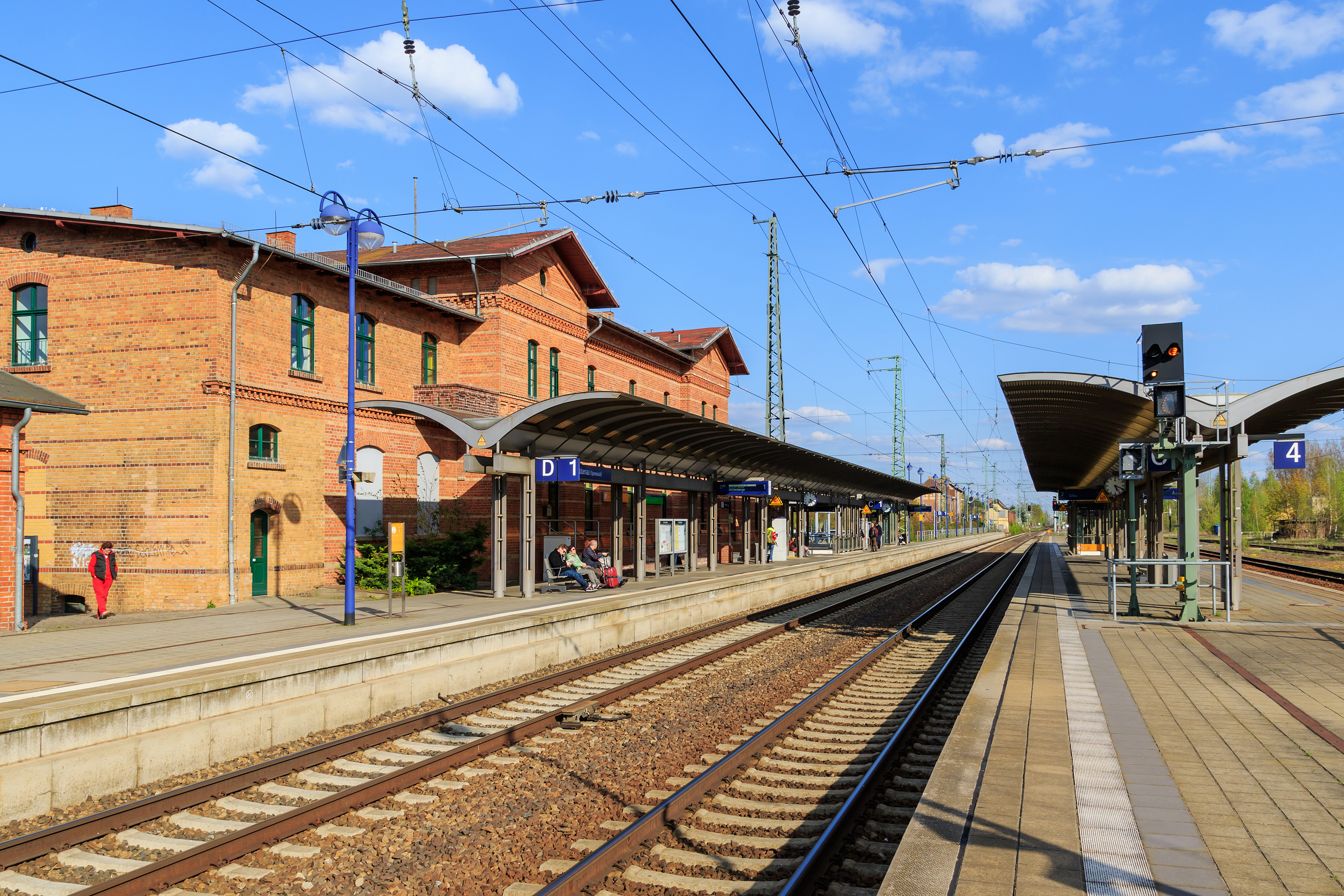
Lübbenau station

Work followed on the 60 km (37 mi)-long Königs Wusterhausen–Lübbenau section, starting in May 2010 and originally planned to end in April 2011. The track and overhead line systems were completely renewed as part of a full closure. New electronic interlockings were installed in Königs Wusterhausen and Lübbenau. Several bogs made the work more difficult. The restart of the line was then delayed by, among other things, repeated cable theft until September 2011. The line speed on the line between Königs Wusterhausen and Cottbus was raised to 160 km/h (99 mph) at the timetable change on 11 December 2011.

The upgrade was brought forward by the use of Federal economic stimulus funds. Overall, these measures cost €130 million.

In March 2016, the state of Brandenburg and Deutsche Bahn agreed to double-track the Lübbenau–Cottbus line at a cost of €2.4 million. Plans would be completed in 2017 and construction would be completed in 2023.

It was uncertain when the section between Cottbus and Görlitz will be electrified. Costs of up to €100 million are forecast. In July 2024, a financing agreement was signed between the federal government and Deutsche Bahn for the double-track expansion and electrification of the section between Cottbus and Görlitz. This will also increase the maximum speed to 160 km/h, which should significantly reduce the journey time between Berlin and Görlitz from the current 3 hours to just over an hour and a half in the future. The financing of the projected costs of up to 100 million euros will also come from structural aid funds due to the coal phase-out.

South of Weißwasser the track has to be moved to the east of B 115 to allow expansion of the Reichwalde open pit lignite mine. The plans are already being developed.

=== Fundamental renewal in the Berlin area ===
The groundbreaking ceremony for the fundamental renewal of the line between the Berlin Ringbahn and Königs Wusterhausen, including the branch to Berlin-Schönefeld Airport, as part of the Grunderneuerung S-Bahn Berlin, S9 Süd ("fundamental renewal of the Berlin S-Bahn, S9 South") project was held on 12 July 2006. In addition to the S-Bahn facilities, this work includes work on the long-distance rail tracks that run parallel on this section. It includes the complete reconstruction of the S-Bahn stations of Adlershof and Baumschulenweg in new locations, the renewal of Schöneweide station, as well as the renovation of seven railway overpasses, including the erection of a new tied-arch bridge over the Britz Canal and the Teltow Canal to allow widening of the waterways. In addition, the renewal of the tracks, the erection of electronic interlockings and the renewal of the traction power supply including substations and overhead line systems are planned. Wildau S-Bahn station will be adapted for the disabled and a second platform track will be installed to allow trains to cross. The cost is estimated to be €350 million. After completion of the construction work, the line speed for the S-Bahn would be increased from 80 to 100 km/h (50 to 62 mph).

The work on Baumschulenweg and Adlershof stations as well as the renewal of the bridges over the Britz and Teltow canals has been completed. The second track at Wildau station was opened on 30 September 2013 and €10.55 million was spent on the provision of barrier-free access.

Modernisation of the Berlin-Schöneweide station began in March 2013 as the last major sub-project of the renewal of the Görlitz Railway in Berlin. The bridges over Sterndamm and the platforms will be renewed, the entrance building will be modernised and the northern forecourt will be rebuilt to a new design. A total of €45 million will be spent on this work. The construction should be completed by 2018.

The re-commissioning of the long-distance rail tracks between Ostkreuz and Schöneweide, which had been interrupted by the construction, was originally planned for the timetable change in December 2014. Deutsche Bahn let tenders for the construction work for the renewal of the track and overhead line systems between Ostkreuz and Grünauer Kreuz in October 2012. The recommissioning finally took place in December 2015.

The 48-hectare area of the former Schöneweide marshalling yard and locomotive depot are to be used for new purposes in the form of a business park. For this purpose, it is planned to clear the area and develop and move three kilometres of the bordering mainline track and demolish some buildings. A new pedestrian and cycle bridge would connect the Landschaftspark Johannisthal (Johannisthal landscape park) with Köllnische Heide (Cölln heath) over the railway and Bundesstraße 96a. As a result, Betriebsbahnhof Schöneweide S-Bahn station would be able to be reached from the Johannisthal side, and in 2020 that station was renamed Berlin-Johannisthal.

== Current operations ==
Today, the line is used mainly for passenger transport. The Berlin S-Bahn operates parallel with regional services over the Görlitz railway. The regional traffic is served by Regionalbahn service RB24 (Eberswalde Hbf – Berlin-Ostkreuz – Senftenberg, operated by DB Regio) and Regionalexpress service RE2 (Wismar – Berlin – Cottbus), operated by Ostdeutsche Eisenbahn (ODEG).

The RB24 service uses the line from its beginning in the Berlin urban area and stops at all stations south of Königs Wusterhausen station to Lübbenau, where the trains switch to the line to Senftenberg. After the completion of the new Berlin Brandenburg Airport, it is planned to run the RB24 service via a loop through the new airport station.

The RE2 service uses the line from Grünau Cross in Berlin to its terminus at Cottbus station and stops at the stations of Brand Tropical Islands, Lübben and Vetschau, with a few services stopping at all stations between Lübbenau and Cottbus.

The OE65 service (Cottbus – Zittau) is operated on the Cottbus–Görlitz section by ODEG, which replaced Lausitzbahn at the timetable change on 14 December 2008. There is also an Intercity train pair (Norddeich Mole – Cottbus) on the line. Until December 2014, a Eurocity train pair, the Wawel, operated over the line on the Hamburg – Cottbus – Kraków) route.

ODEG operated the OE36 service (Berlin-Schöneweide – Beeskow – Frankfurt/Oder on the Berlin-Schöneweide – Königs Wusterhausen) section until the timetable change in December 2011. After that the regional station at Schöneweide was closed because of construction work and the OE36 service (called RB36 since December 2012) has since run from Berlin-Lichtenberg and reaches the Görlitz railway at Grünau Cross; since December 2014 services have terminated at Königs Wusterhausen.

== Berlin area ==
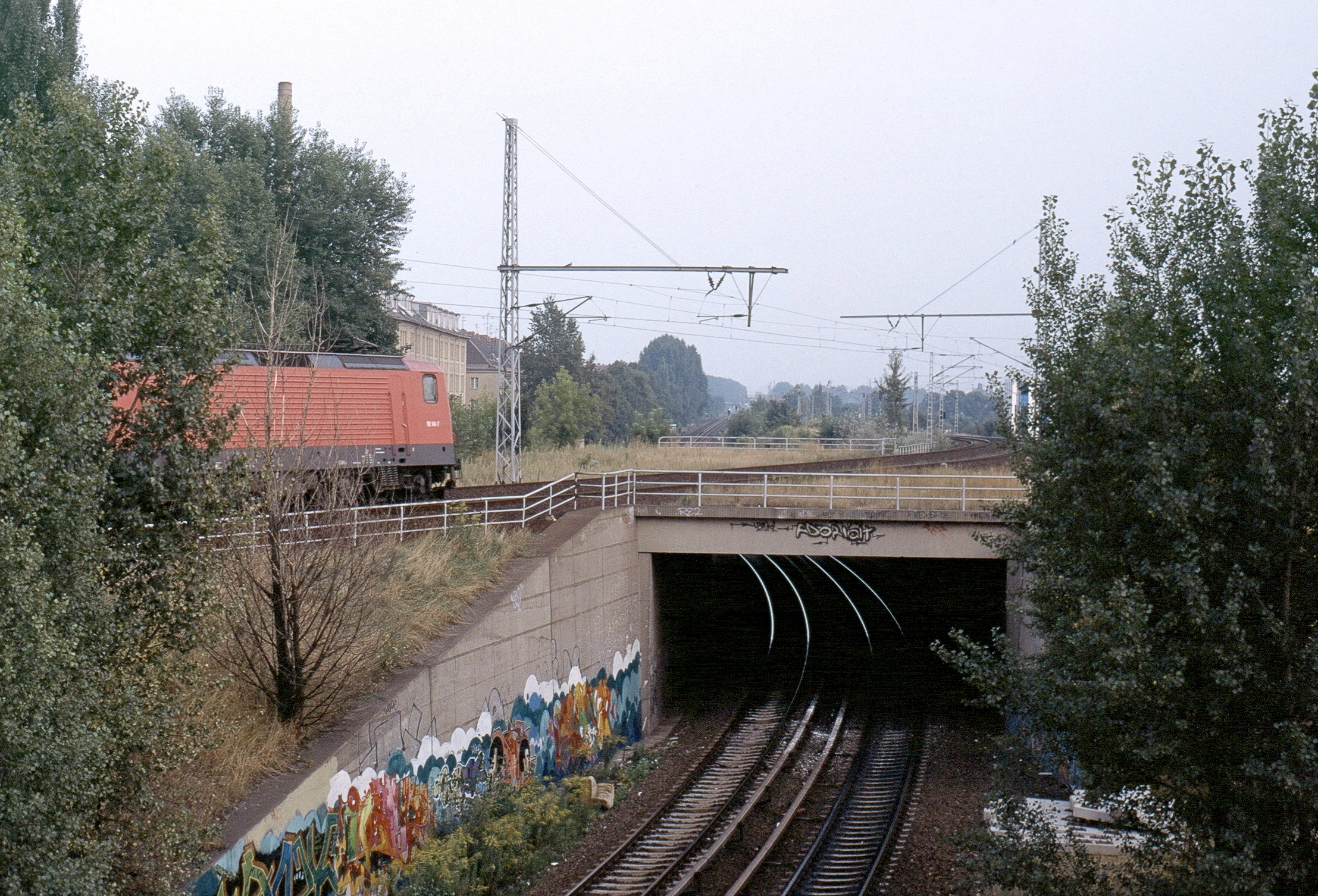
Flying junction at the current start of the line in Berlin-Treptow

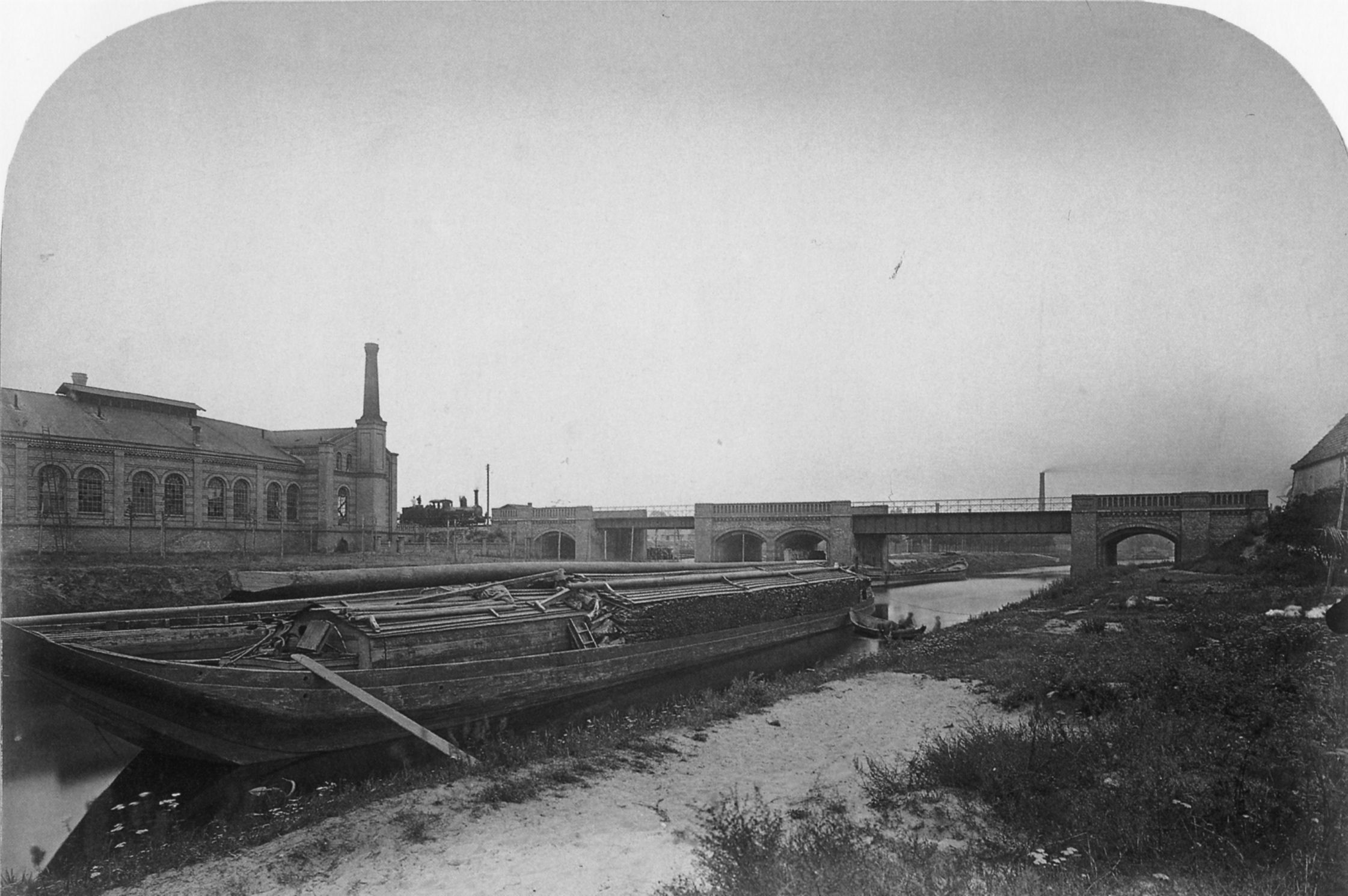
Railway bridge of the Görlitz railway over the Landwehr Canal, at the left is the Görlitz Railway's roundhouse, 1869

In the city of Berlin the Görlitz railway is mostly still in operation. Only the short section between the Berlin Ringbahn (ring line) and the former Görlitz station has been closed to passenger traffic since 1952 and was left to nature after freight traffic was also discontinued after 1985. After 1994, a connecting path was built on the railway embankment between Görlitzer Park and Alt-Treptow, although this is interrupted in the area of the extended A 100 and the Ringbahn. The line south of the Ringbahn is served by long-distance and regional traffic as well as by the Berlin S-Bahn to Königs Wusterhausen. The line is served by both mainline and regional trains as well as the Berlin S-Bahn.

The long-distance tracks now run to the junction with the ring line at Treptower Park, then switch to the eastern Ringbahn via Ostkreuz and continue to Gesundbrunnen or leave the Ringbahn via a branch north of Ostkreuz station to Lichtenberg station. Trains that travel to and from the Hauptbahnhof (central station) or Ostbahnhof are diverted to the Outer ring in southeast Berlin at Grünau Cross (Grünauer Kreuz) to the Silesian Railway and the Stadtbahn.

Although the Görlitz railway has its own suburban tracks, these never led to the old Görlitz station, but from its construction connected to the Ringbahn and the Stadtbahn via Treptower Park, as they still do. In addition a connecting line also runs from Baumschulenweg to the southern part of the Ringbahn via Köllnische Heide. Both suburban lines were converted to electric operation in 1929 and became part of the S-Bahn on its foundation shortly later.

By a decision of 23 July 2012, the Federal Railway Authority declared a 4.5 hectares (11 acres) area, in the district of Treptow-Köpenick, located between track-kilometre 0.9 and 2.2, to be free of rail operations.
