= Berlin Sonnenallee station =

Railway stop in Neukölln, Germany

Coordinates: 52.4729°N 13.4554°E

Sonnenallee
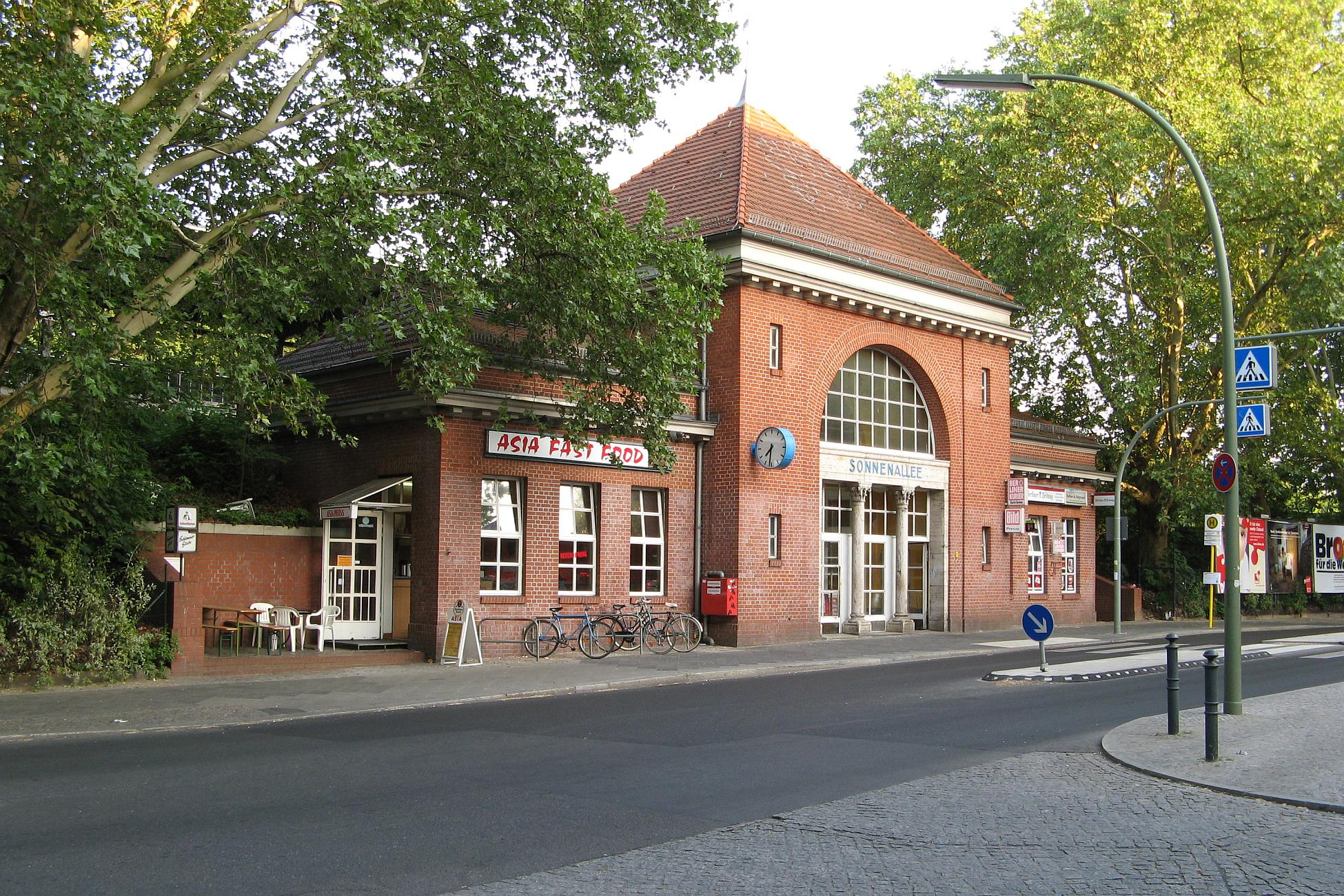
- Station entrance (2007)

General information
- Location: Siegfried-Aufhäuser-Platz; 12055 Berlin; Neukölln; Berlin; Germany
- Owner: DB Netz
- Operator: DB Station&Service
- Lines: Berlin Ringbahn (KBS 200.4x)
- Platforms: 1 island platform
- Tracks: 2
- Train operators: S-Bahn Berlin
- Connections: M41 171 N70 N79

Other information
- Station code: 7736
- DS100 code: BSO
- IBNR: 8089327
- Category: 4
- Fare zone: VBB: Berlin A/5555
- Website: www.bahnhof.de

History
- Opened: 1 October 1912; 113 years ago
- Closed: 1945, end of April to 18 June 1945; 18 September 1980 to 17 December 1997; 28 years ago
- Electrified: 6 November 1928; 97 years ago
- Former names: 1912-1939: Kaiser-Friedrich-Straße; 1939-1945: Braunauer Straße since July 1945: Sonnenallee

Services
Preceding station	Berlin S-Bahn	Following station
Treptower Park One-way operation	S41	Neukölln Ringbahn (clockwise)
Treptower Park Ringbahn (counter-clockwise)	S42	Neukölln One-way operation
Location
- Location within Berlin

Sonnenallee is a railway station in the Neukölln district of Berlin. It is served by the S-Bahn lines S41 and S42 and is located at the southeastern end of the major street of the same name, about which a film was produced in 1999.

== Notable places nearby ==
- Estrel Hotel
