= S46 (Berlin) =

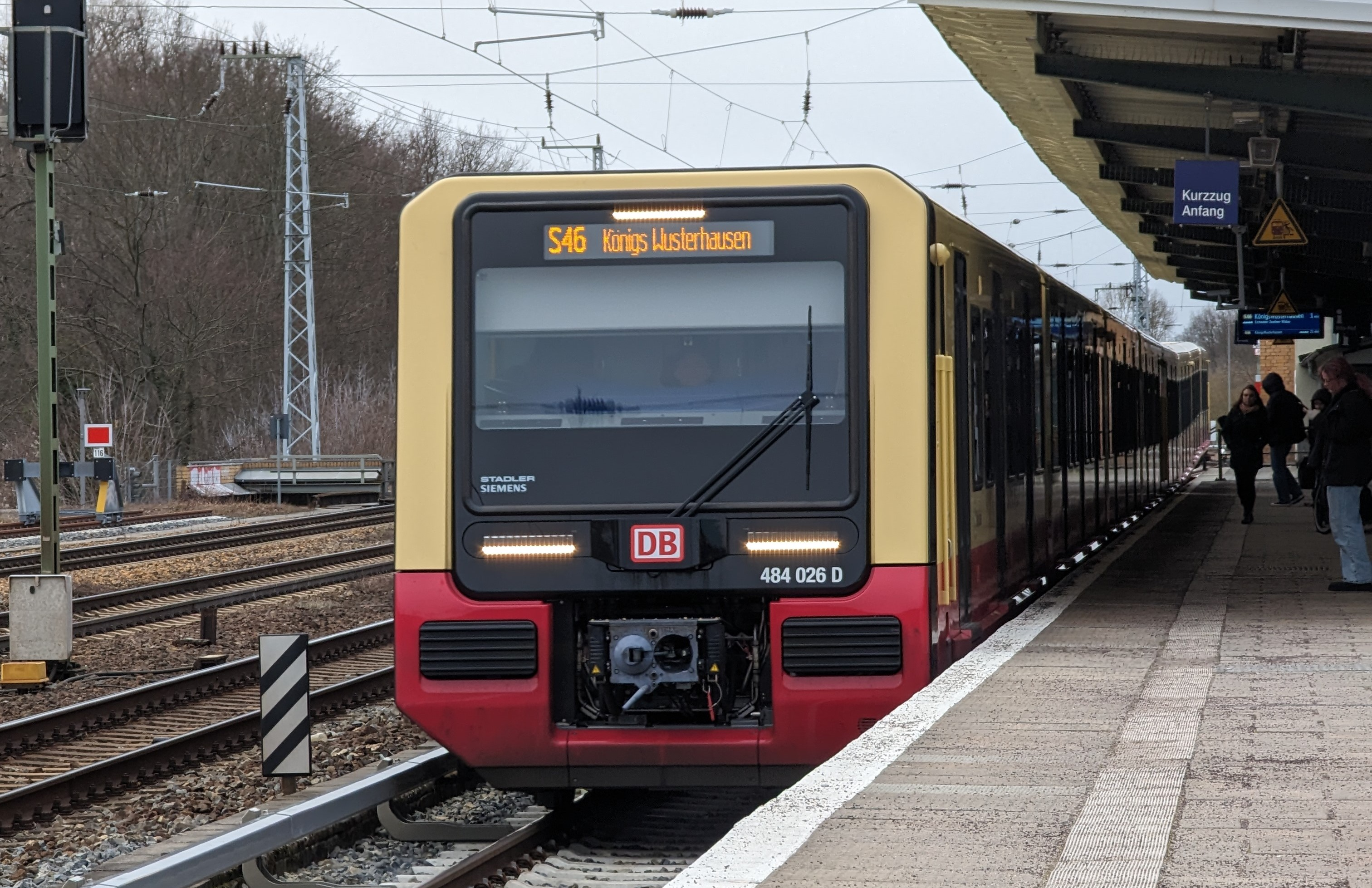

Overview
- Locale: Berlin

Service
- System: Berlin S-Bahn
- Operator(s): S-Bahn Berlin GmbH
- Rolling stock: DBAG Class 483; DBAG Class 484

Technical
- Electrification: 750 V DC Third rail

The Berlin S-Bahn line 46 (S46) runs from Königs Wusterhausen to Westend. It operates over:

- the Görlitz line, opened in 1866 and electrified in 1929,
- the Baumschulenweg–Neukölln link line, opened on 8 June 1896 and electrified in 1928 and
- the Ring line, completed in 1877 and electrified in 1926.

Until 28 May 2006, the line ran from Königs Wusterhausen to Gesundbrunnen. The line was shortened to Westend to allow frequency improvements to the S41 and S42 ring lines. The shortened line contains 23 stations.
