= Berlin Treptower Park station =

Railway station in Berlin, Germany

Treptower Park
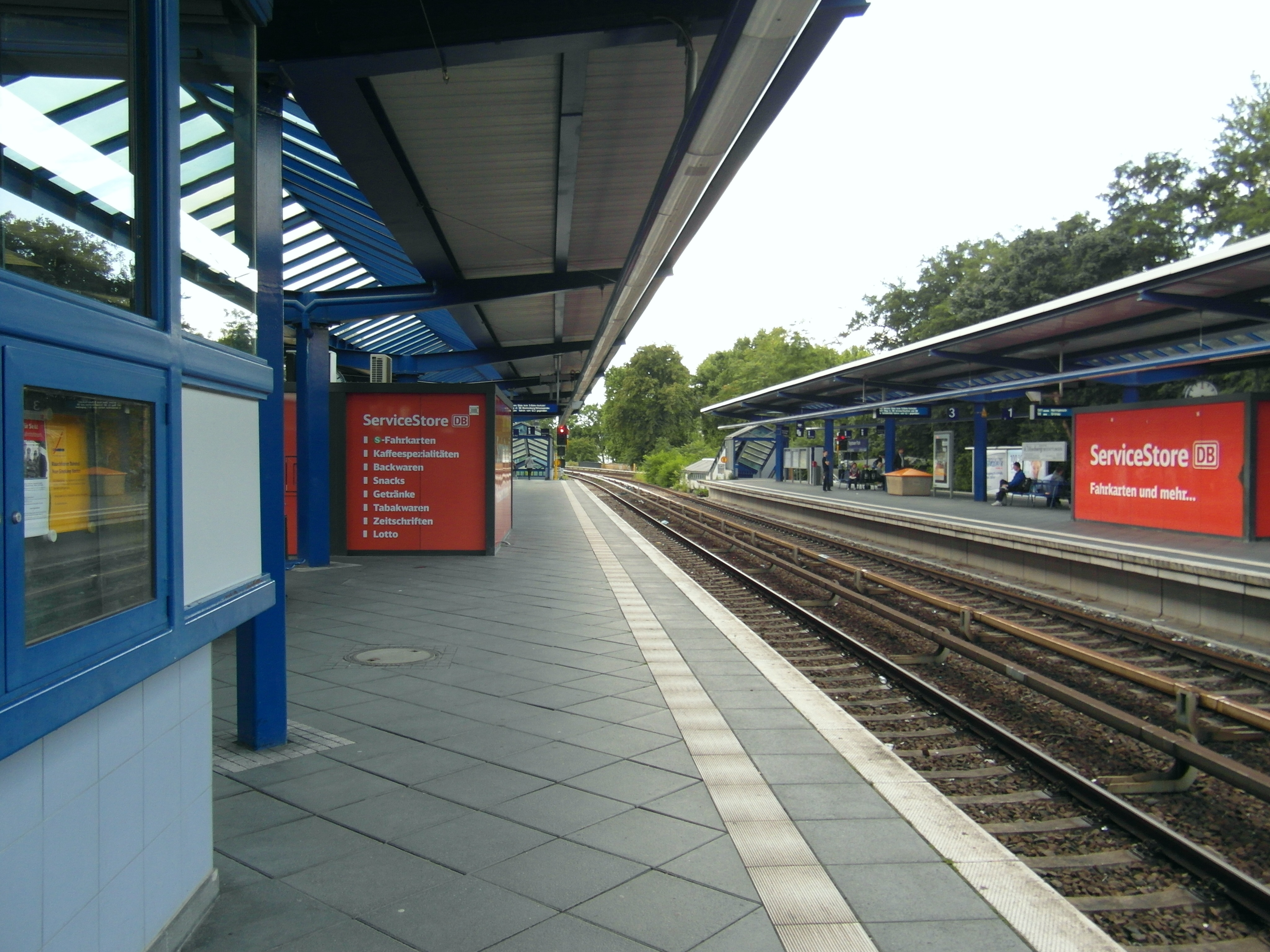
- 2012

General information
- Location: Puschkinallee/Elsenstraße; 12435 Berlin; Treptow; Berlin; Germany
- Coordinates: 52°29′38″N 13°27′41″E
- Owner: DB Netz
- Operator: DB Station&Service
- Lines: Berlin Ringbahn (KBS 200.4x)
- Platforms: 2 island platforms
- Tracks: 4
- Train operators: S-Bahn Berlin
- Connections: 104 165 166 194 265

Other information
- Station code: 6251
- DS100 code: BTP
- IBNR: 8089043
- Category: 4
- Fare zone: VBB: Berlin A/5555
- Website: www.bahnhof.de

History
- Opened: 1 February 1875; 151 years ago

Services
Preceding station	Berlin S-Bahn	Following station
Ostkreuz One-way operation	S41	Sonnenallee Ringbahn (clockwise)
Ostkreuz Ringbahn (counter-clockwise)	S42	Sonnenallee One-way operation
Ostkreuz towards Birkenwerder	S8	Plänterwald towards Wildau
Ostkreuz towards Waidmannslust	S85	Plänterwald towards Grünau
Warschauer Straße towards Spandau	S9	Plänterwald towards BER Airport
Location
- Location within Berlin

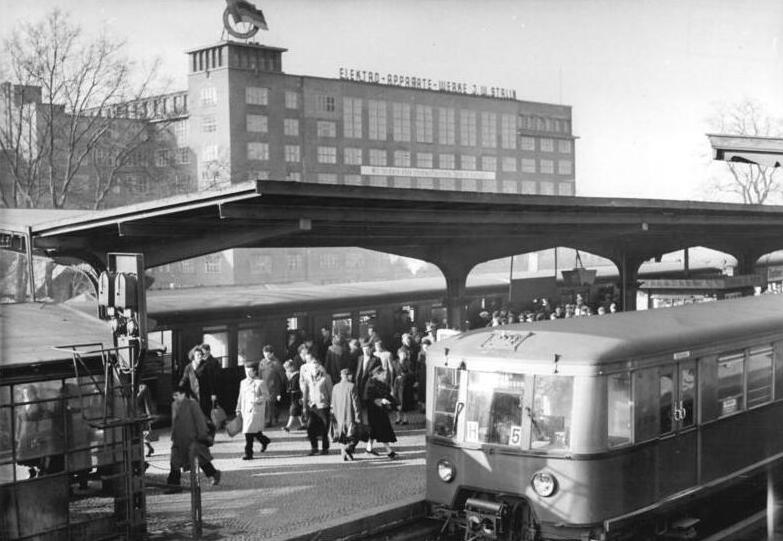
Station in 1958

Treptower Park is a railway station in the Alt-Treptow locality of Berlin. It sits on the Ringbahn is served by the S-Bahn lines S41, S42, S8, S85 and S9 and so represents an important interchange point on the Berlin S-Bahn network. The station consists of two island platforms, enabling cross-platform interchange between lines running in the same direction. It is located next to the park of the same name.

The station sits on the edge of Treptower Park and next to the Elsenbrücke over the River Spree. A number of station underpasses connect the park to Elsenstraße.

== Notable places nearby ==
- Archenhold Observatory
- Treptower Park
- Soviet War Memorial (Treptower Park)
