= S45 (Berlin) =

Line of the Berlin S-Bahn

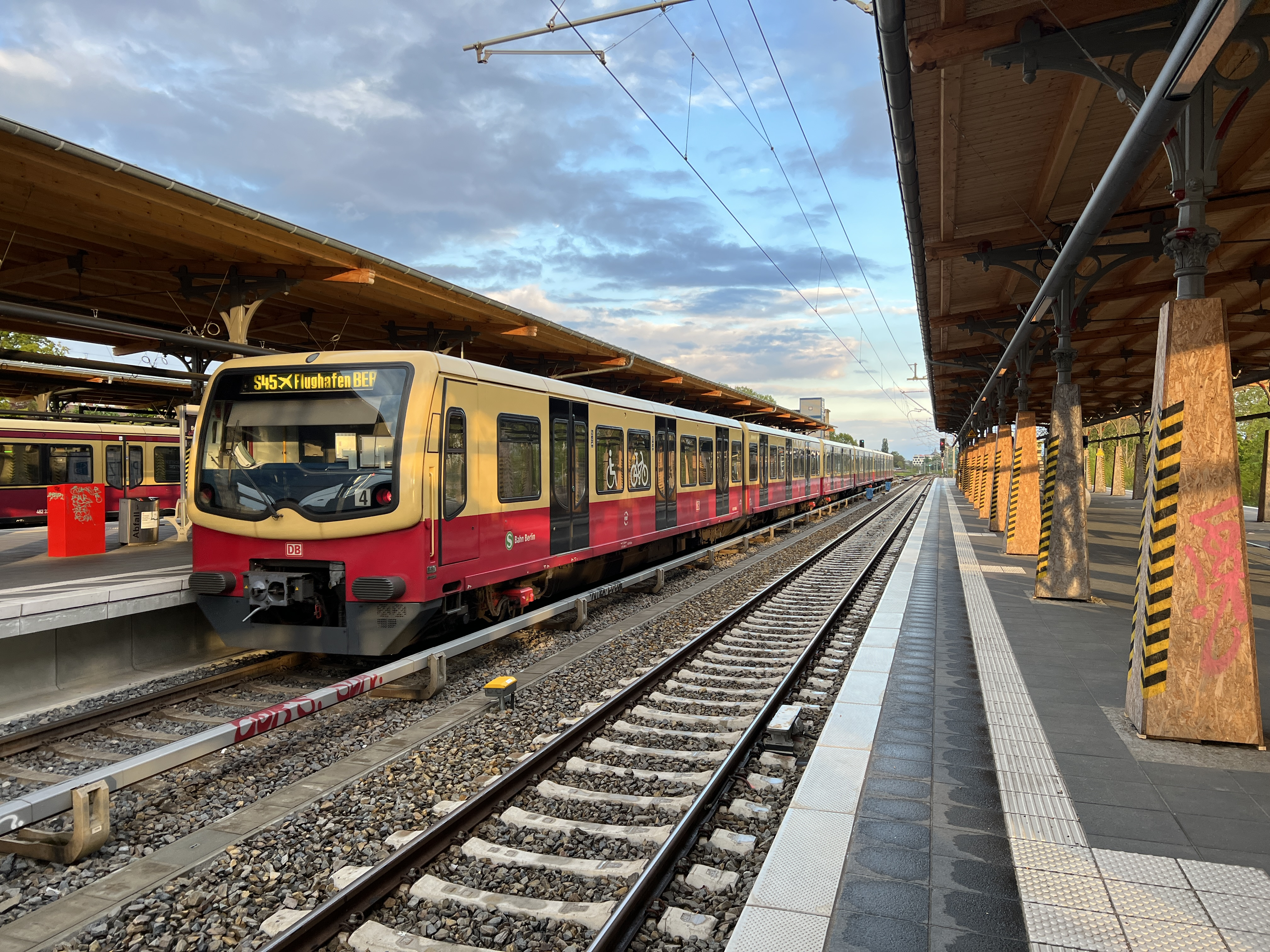

Overview
- Locale: Berlin

Service
- System: Berlin S-Bahn
- Operator: S-Bahn Berlin GmbH
- Rolling stock: DBAG Class 483; DBAG Class 484

Technical
- Electrification: 750 V DC Third rail

S45 was a line on the Berlin S-Bahn. The line has officially been discontinued as of 14 December 2025.

It operated from Flughafen BER beneath Berlin Brandenburg Airport to Südkreuz via:

- a very short section of the Outer ring, opened in 1951 and electrified in 1983,
- a short section of the former Outer freight ring opened in the early 1940s and electrified in 1983,
- the Görlitz line, opened in 1866 and electrified in 1929,
- the Baumschulenweg–Neukölln link line, opened on 8 June 1896 and electrified in 1928 and
- the Ring line, completed in 1877 and electrified in 1926.

== History ==
A southern extension from the former terminus at the Schönefeld Airport station has been constructed prior to the opening of the new Berlin Brandenburg Airport. The rail extension includes two new stops: Waßmannsdorf and Berlin Brandenburg Airport. Due to the opening of the new airport, Schönefeld Airport station has been renamed "Flughafen BER - Terminal 5 station". When Terminal 5 was closed, the station has been renamed Schönefeld (bei Berlin) station.
