= Berlin Jannowitzbrücke station =

Railway station in Berlin, Germany

Jannowitzbrücke
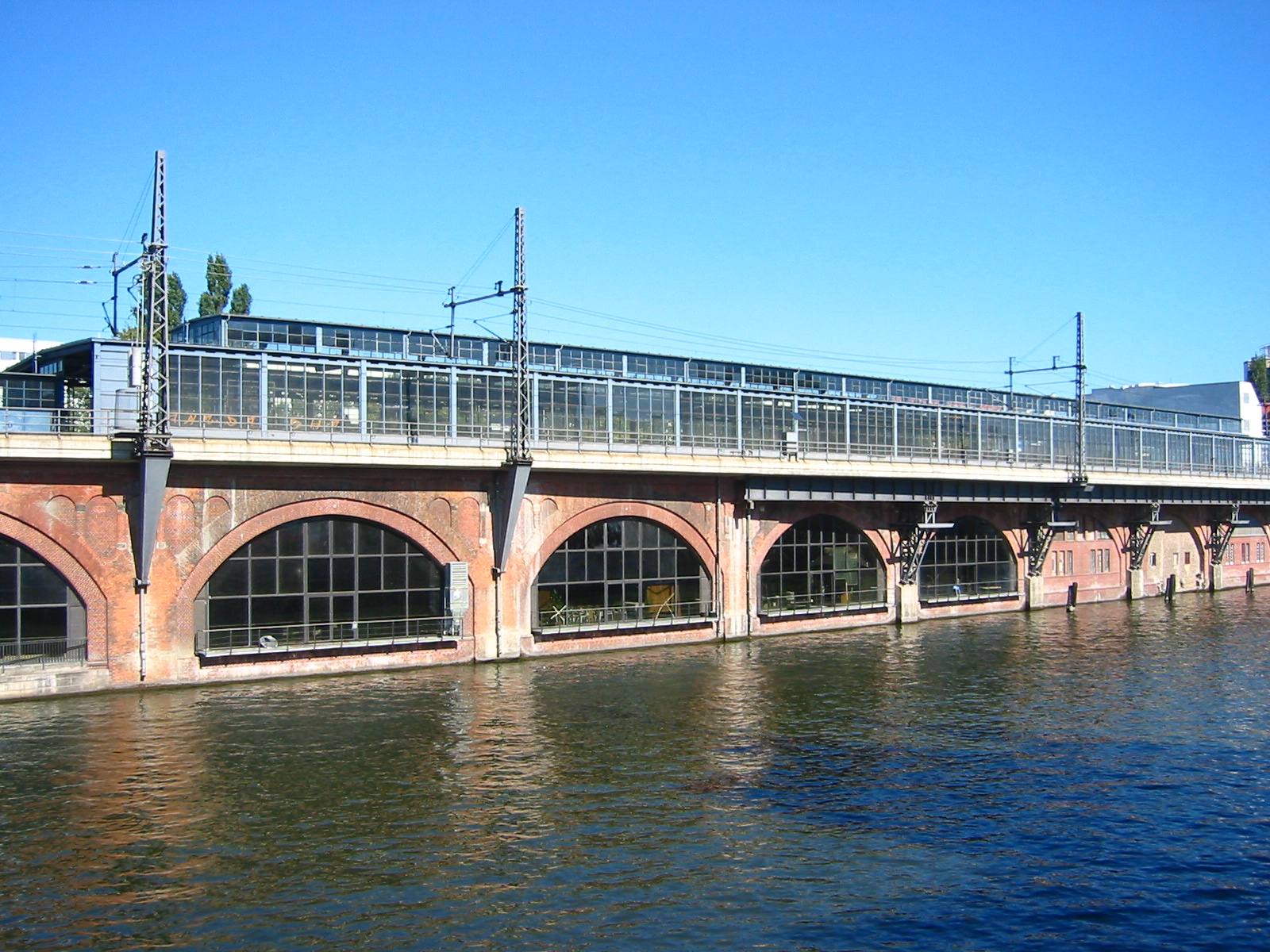

General information
- Location: Brückenstraße/Alexanderstraße, Mitte, Berlin; Germany
- Coordinates: 52°30′53″N 13°25′06″E
- Owner: DB Netz
- Operator: DB Station&Service
- Line: Stadtbahn
- Platforms: 1
- Tracks: 2
- Train operators: S-Bahn Berlin

Construction
- Accessible: Yes

Other information
- Station code: 3032
- DS100 code: BJB
- Category: 4
- Fare zone: : Berlin A/5555
- Website: www.bahnhof.de

History
- Opened: 7 February 1882

Services
| Preceding station | Berlin S-Bahn | Following station |
|---|---|---|
| Alexanderplatz towards Spandau | S3 | Ostbahnhof towards Erkner |
| Alexanderplatz towards Westkreuz | S5 | Ostbahnhof towards Strausberg Nord |
| Alexanderplatz towards Potsdam Hbf | S7 | Ostbahnhof towards Ahrensfelde |
| Alexanderplatz towards Spandau | S9 | Ostbahnhof towards BER Airport |
| Preceding station | Berlin U-Bahn | Following station |
| Alexanderplatz towards Wittenau | U8 | Heinrich-Heine-Straße towards Hermannstraße |
Location

Berlin Jannowitzbrücke is a station in the Mitte district of Berlin. It is served by the S-Bahn lines S3, S5, S7, and S9 and the U-Bahn line U8. It is located next to the Jannowitz Bridge (Jannowitzbrücke) and is a public transport interchange. South of the station is Brückenstraße (“bridge street”) and north of it are Holzmarkstrasse and Alexanderstraße. The station also serves as a stop for various private excursion and sightseeing boats, among others, those of the Stern und Kreisschiffahrt and Reederei Riedel companies.

== S-Bahn station ==
When the Jannowitz Bridge was rebuilt (1881–1883), the suburban station of the same name was opened on the Berlin Stadtbahn (“city railway”) viaduct next to the Spree river. The opening date is officially stated to be 7 February 1882. Since the station was just an open platform with a canopy, passengers were exposed to the weather and the smoke of the locomotives. In 1885, the station was given its first weather protection in the form of a wall of glass, which was built between the suburban tracks and the long-distance tracks. A roof was built above the wall, which was connected to the existing platform canopy, creating a half-open concourse to the north.

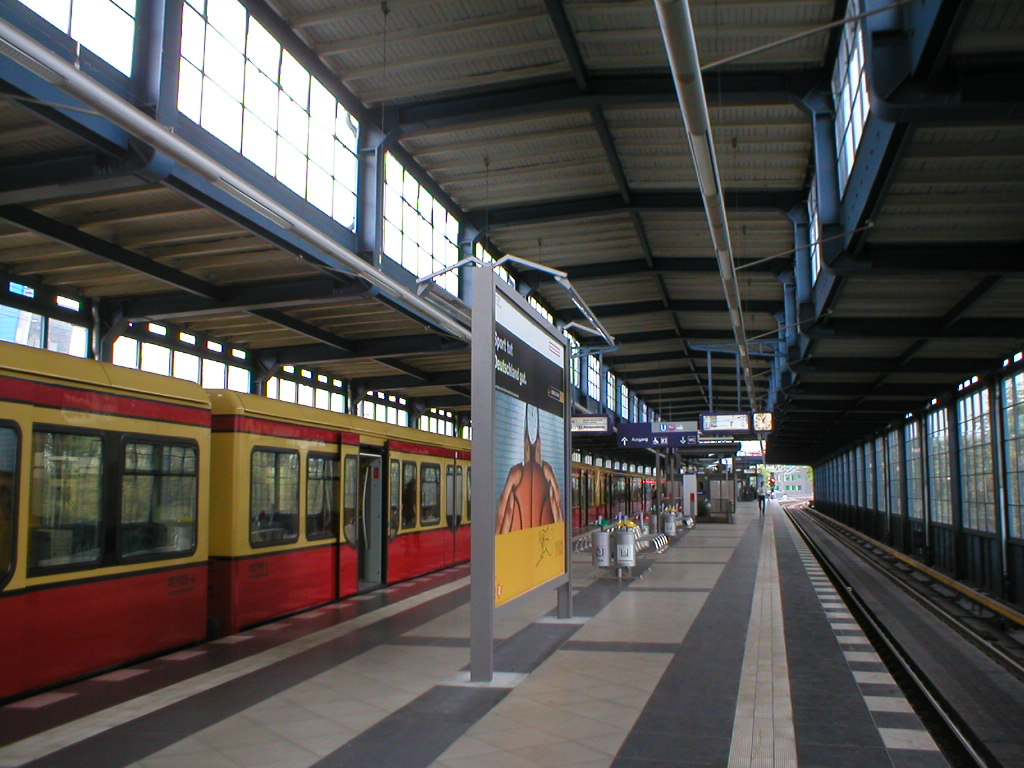
S-Bahn platforms, class 481/482 train on the left

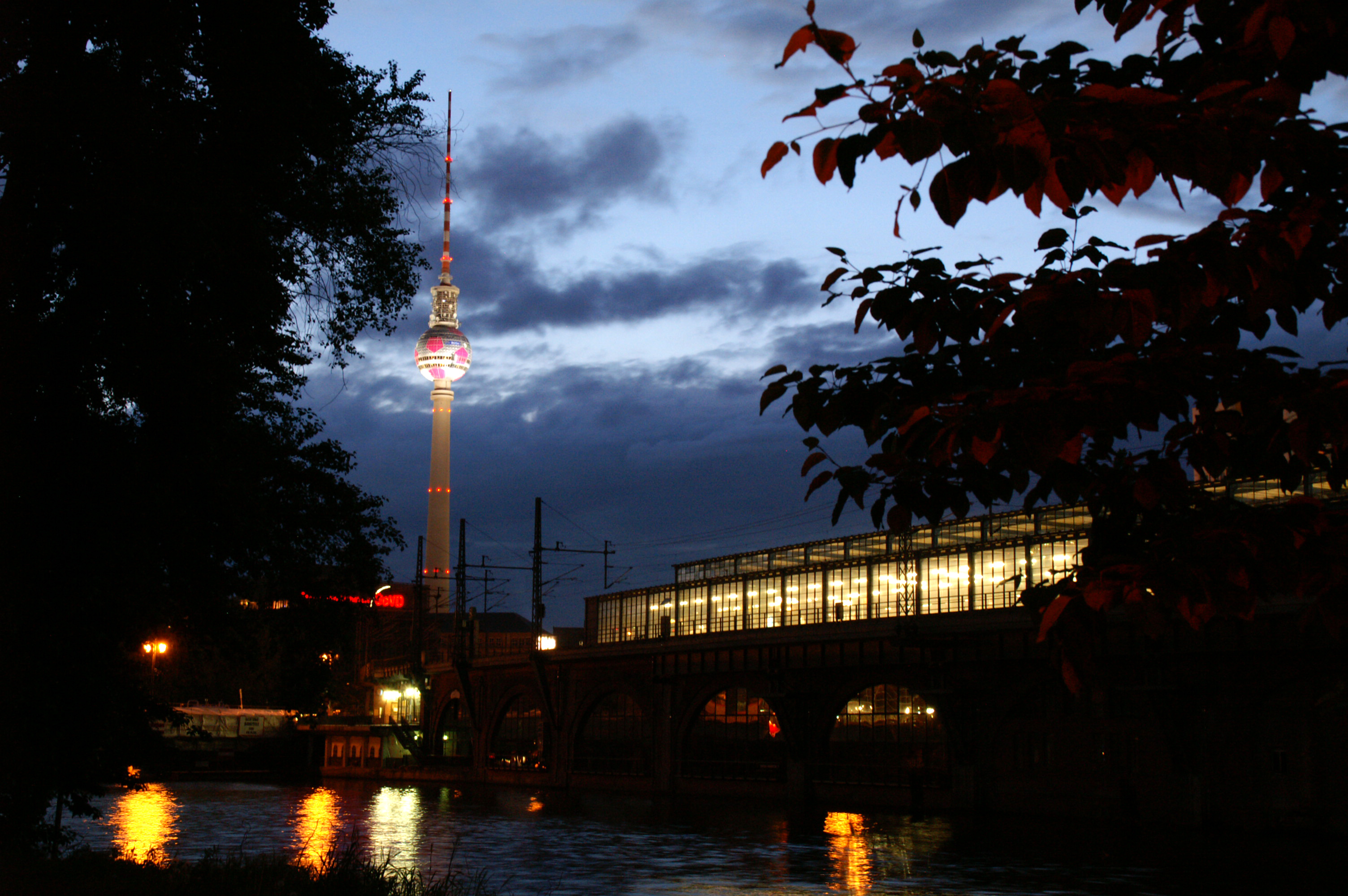
Station and bridge in the evening

The traffic on the Stadtbahn steadily increased and the narrow central platform on the suburban tracks at Jannowitzbrücke had to be widened. To obtain sufficient space, the tracks of the long-distance line were shifted slightly towards the south in 1906/1907, so it rested on a supporting structure built directly in the river. The structure was slightly modified in 1997 to increase its stability.

With the establishment of the S-Bahn network and the electrification of the Stadtbahn from 1928, the station was demolished and rebuilt in its present form between 1927 and 1932 to plans by the architect Hugo Röttcher. S-Bahn trains ran through the newly built station from 11 June 1928.

At the end of World War II, rail operations were forced to stop in April 1945. On 15 November 1945, S-Bahn operations restarted and traffic grew steadily because it was an interchange between the S-Bahn and the U-Bahn. This function as an interchange was removed with the construction of the Berlin Wall on 13 August 1961; the signs to the U-Bahn were removed and Jannowitzbrücke station was now just an S-Bahn station. Already on 11 November 1989—a few days after Die Wende—it was again possible to change between the S-Bahn and the U-Bahn.

Subsequently, there was a thorough renovation of the Stadtbahn. The S-Bahn trains were diverted to run over the disused long-distance tracks outside the train shed, so they could not stop at the station. This made it possible to completely rehabilitate the S-Bahn station between 15 November 1994 and 21 October 1996. Since then, the station has included a lift, several escalators and shops.

== U-Bahn station ==
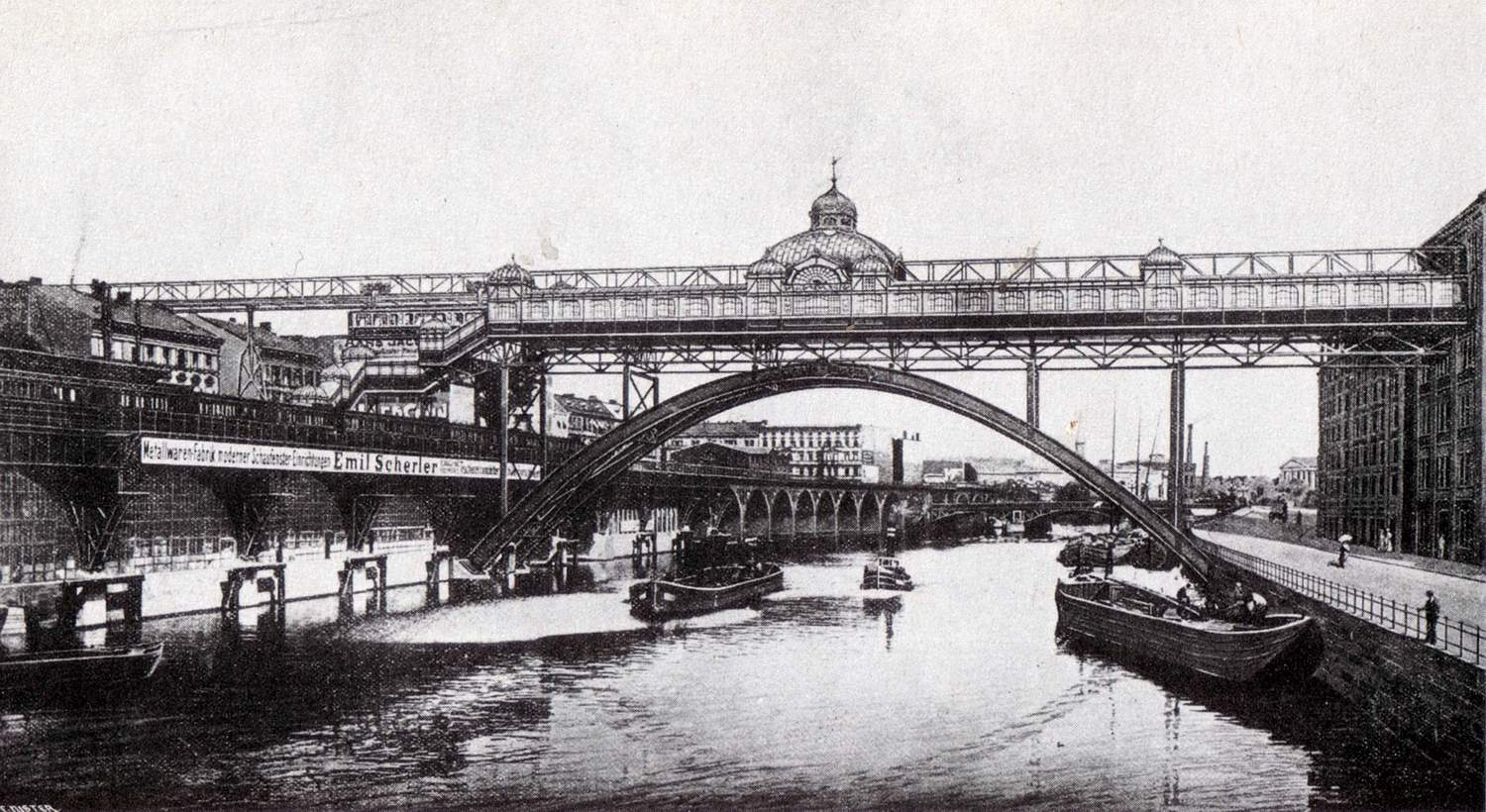
Drawing for a proposed Jannowitzbrücke monorail station, 1904

At the end of the 19th century, the decision was taken in Berlin to build a new rapid transit rail system and various proposals were submitted for its implementation. In addition to the U-Bahn system of Siemens, which was eventually built, the idea of a monorail, as had already been built for example in Wuppertal, was also proposed. A Jannowitzbrücke monorail station was also considered. For aesthetic reasons, the Berlin authorities rejected this proposal, however, and favoured the subway systems proposed by Siemens and AEG.

The AEG set out plans for a new railway from Rixdorf (now Neukölln) to Gesundbrunnen in 1907. The negotiations with Berlin were very tough, until the two parties were finally able to agree on an arrangement in 1912. After the First World War and the subsequent economic crisis, AEG-Schnellbahn-AG, a subsidiary of AEG, had to file for insolvency and was liquidated. The city of Berlin took over the underground works that had previously been built; this included, among other things, the tunnel under the Spree near Jannowitzbrücke. This was not under Jannowitz Bridge, but under the nearby Waisen Bridge, which was destroyed in the Second World War and not rebuilt. The Waisen Tunnel was not included in the U-Bahn line when it was opened; instead it was later rebuilt for the transfer of rolling stock between lines. The city also modified the U-Bahn line at Alexanderplatz to improve connections.

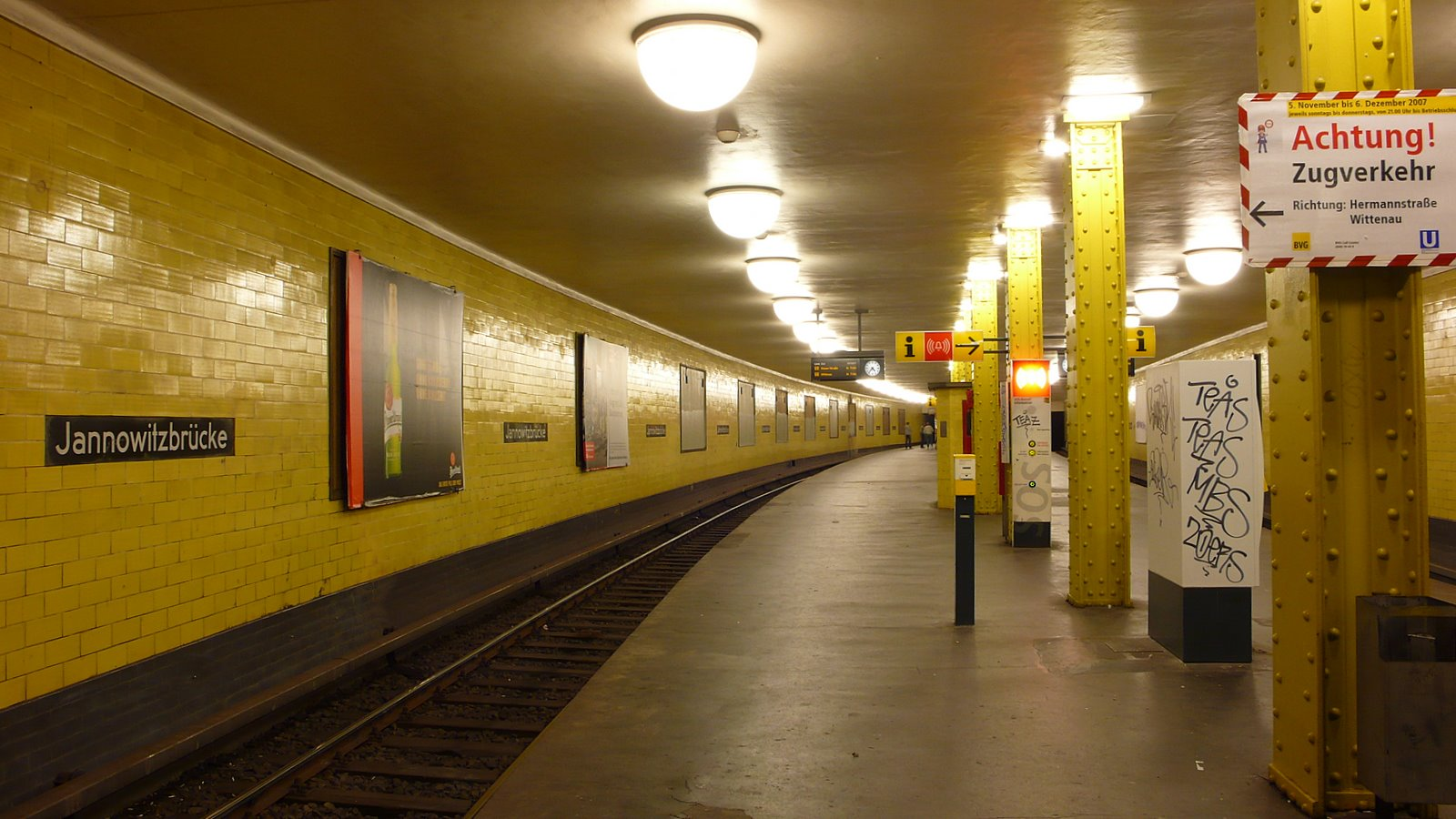
Jannowitzbrücke U-Bahn station

The line from Schönleinstraße to Neanderstraße, part of today's line U8, was opened on 6 April 1928. As already mentioned, the curve had to be modified. Since Jannowitz Bridge was in poor condition, it was replaced by a new structure. Since Jannowitz Bridge could not be used, road traffic was diverted via the nearby Waisen Bridge. A temporary bridge had to be built for pedestrians. Finally, on 18 April 1930, the section from Neanderstraße to Gesundbrunnen was opened, including Jannowitzbrücke U-Bahn station.

In World War II, the station suffered little damage and it only had to be closed during the period of the final battle. The station was closed between April and 16 June 1945, then line D—now line U8—was the first of all the U-Bahn lines to be re-opened for its full length and operations on the Gesundbrunnen–Leinestraße route commenced on 16 June.

16 years later, on 13 August 1961, the station had to be closed again. However, this time, it was not only for a few months, but for more than 28 years. Due to the construction of the Berlin Wall, the station became a "ghost station". Trains simply ran through on line D without stopping in East Berlin. The entrances to the two levels above were completely walled off so that only a faint rumble of moving trains was still heard. Only trains of the oldest class were used on this line and on Line C (now line U6) as Berliner Verkehrsbetriebe (West)—the operator in West Berlin—was concerned that East Germany could delay new trains in the Waisentunnel during a political action.

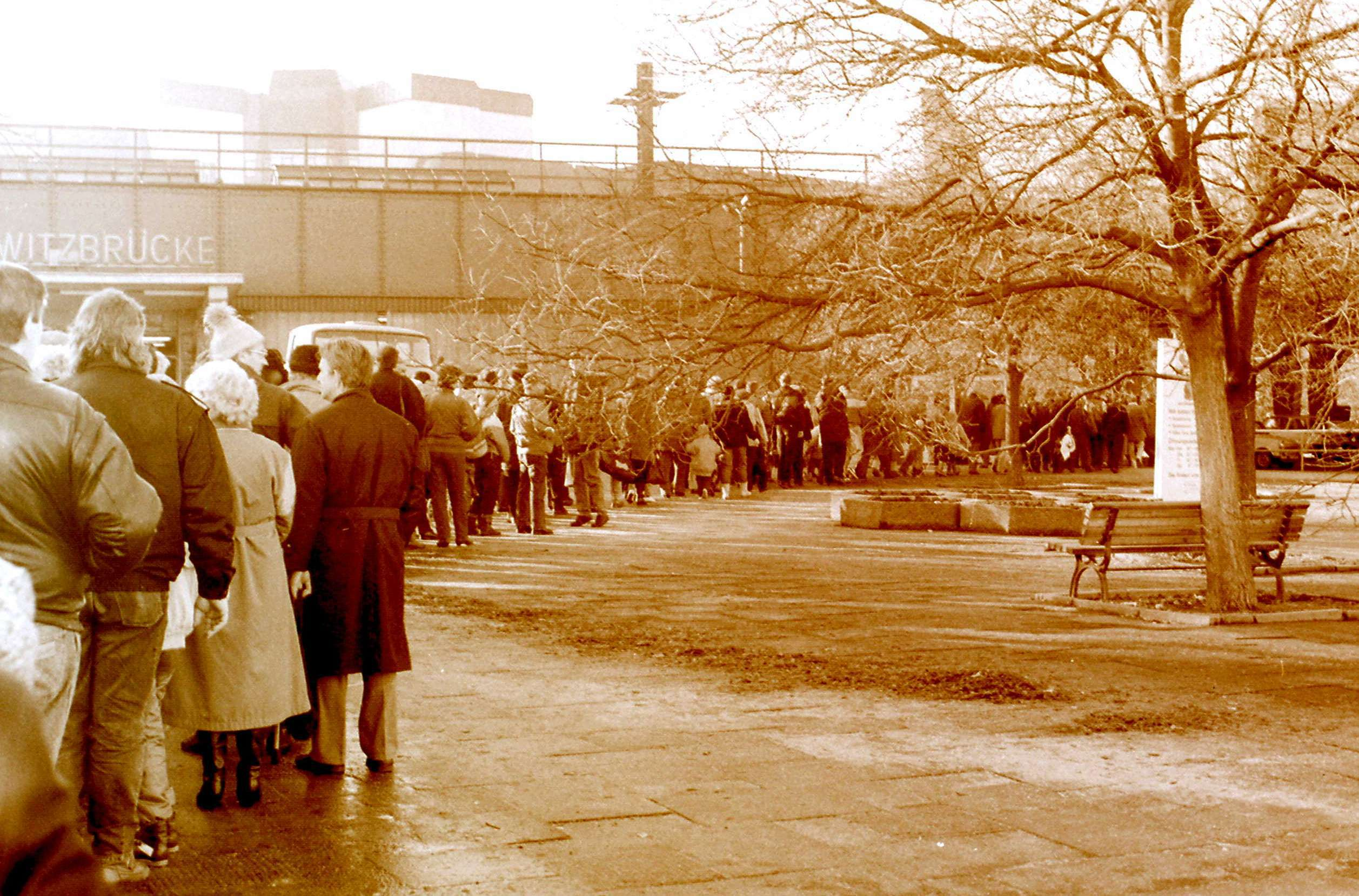
Opening of the temporary Jannowitzbrücke U-Bahn station in 1989. Many younger people in the GDR saw this U-Bahn station for the first time in their lives

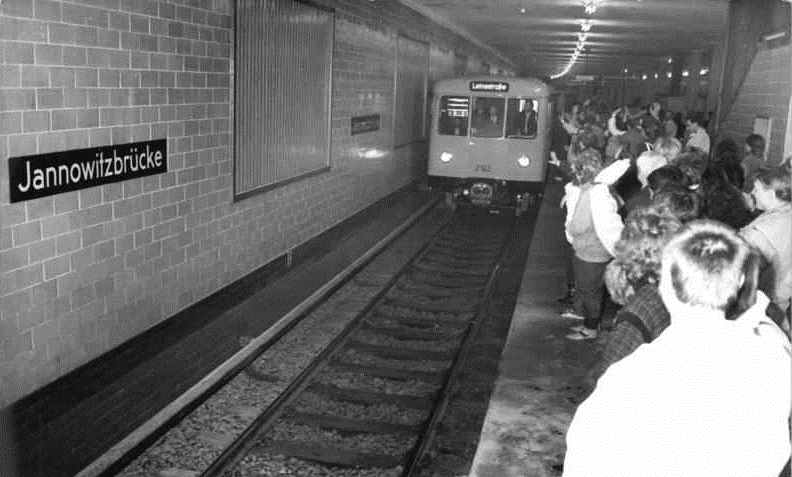
The reopening of Jannowitzbrücke U-Bahn station on 11 November 1989, the first of the ghost stations to be reopened after the Fall of the Berlin Wall.

During the Wende, Jannowitzbrücke U-Bahn station again played a very important role: just two days after the fall of the Berlin Wall, on 11 November 1989, the U-Bahn station was reopened as a border crossing point, which was located on the mezzanine between the U-Bahn and S-Bahn.

Thus, the station played an important role for border traffic: for East Berliners, who had arrived on the S-Bahn, it was now possible to reach the centre of West Berlin via Hermannplatz and the U7. Months later, on 1 July 1990, the border controls were abolished with the establishment of a monetary, economic and social union between the two Germanys. Thus, the station could again be used without restrictions.

In 2002 and 2003, the ceiling of the station was renovated, with the replacement of lighting and the installation of the “DAISY” passenger information system. Beginning on 19 January 2009, there was a general overhaul of the platform, with the platform for trains running towards Hermannstrasse completely renewed and tactile paving installed during the first phase completed on 3 May. The second phase, carried out from 4 May to 23 July 2009, upgraded the platform for trains running towards Wittenau. The opening was planned for 13 August, but with restrictions on S-Bahn operations (no traffic on the Stadtbahn), the station was reopened earlier.

In a later phase of the station renovation, the southern vestibule was restored and an exit was opened towards Holzmarktstraße. A new "Service-Center" was also opened. The station furniture was renewed and the tiles in the area behind the tracks and on the platform (on pillars, etc.) were renewed.

The completion of a barrier-free upgrade is scheduled for 2017 at an estimated cost of €2 million. The installation of a lift was originally planned to be completed in 2016.

== Connections ==
The station is the meeting point of four of the Berlin S-Bahn S3, S5, S7, S9 and the U8. It is also possible to change to bus route 248, operated by Berliner Verkehrsbetriebe (Berlin Transport Company).
