= Heinrich-Heine-Straße station =

Station of the Berlin U-Bahn

Coordinates: 52°30′37″N 13°24′57″E

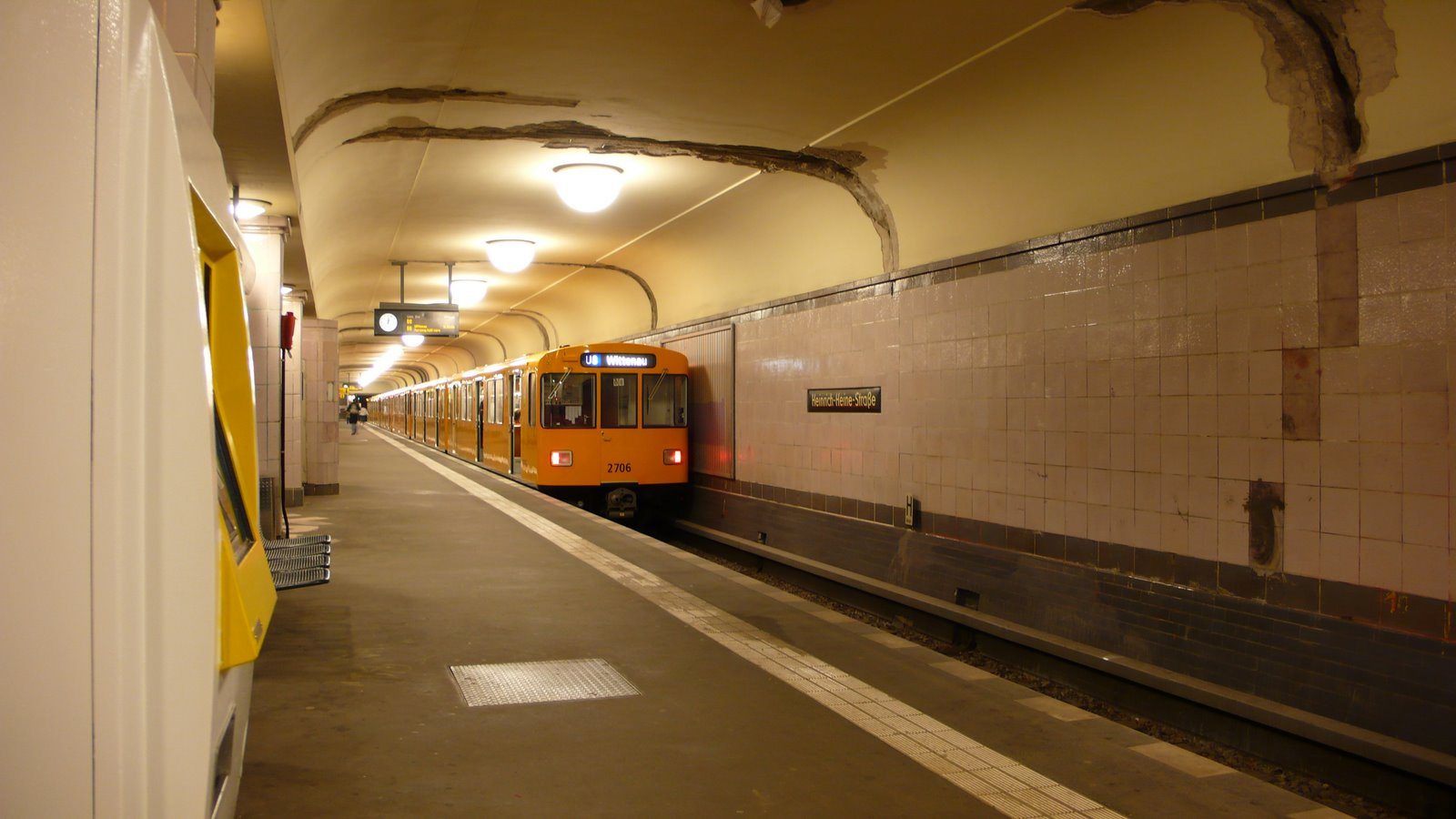
Heinrich-Heine-Straße U-Bahn station

Heinrich-Heine-Straße is a Berlin U-Bahn station on the U8, located under the street of the same name in Mitte, and protected as an architectural landmark. The street and the station were called Neanderstraße until 1960.

== History ==
After the City of Berlin took over the incomplete GN-Bahn (Gesundbrunnen - Neukölln Railway) line from the AEG subsidiary which was unable to complete it in the aftermath of World War I, the Neanderstraße station was built in 1926–28 and opened on 6 April 1928. It was the northern terminus of the line for two years, until 18 April 1930, when Gesundbrunnen station opened.

Alfred Grenander designed the station in his characteristic sparse New Objectivist style and chose pale violet or aubergine (similar to Kottbusser Tor) as the distinguishing colour for the wall tiles and the tiled central pillars on the platform level.

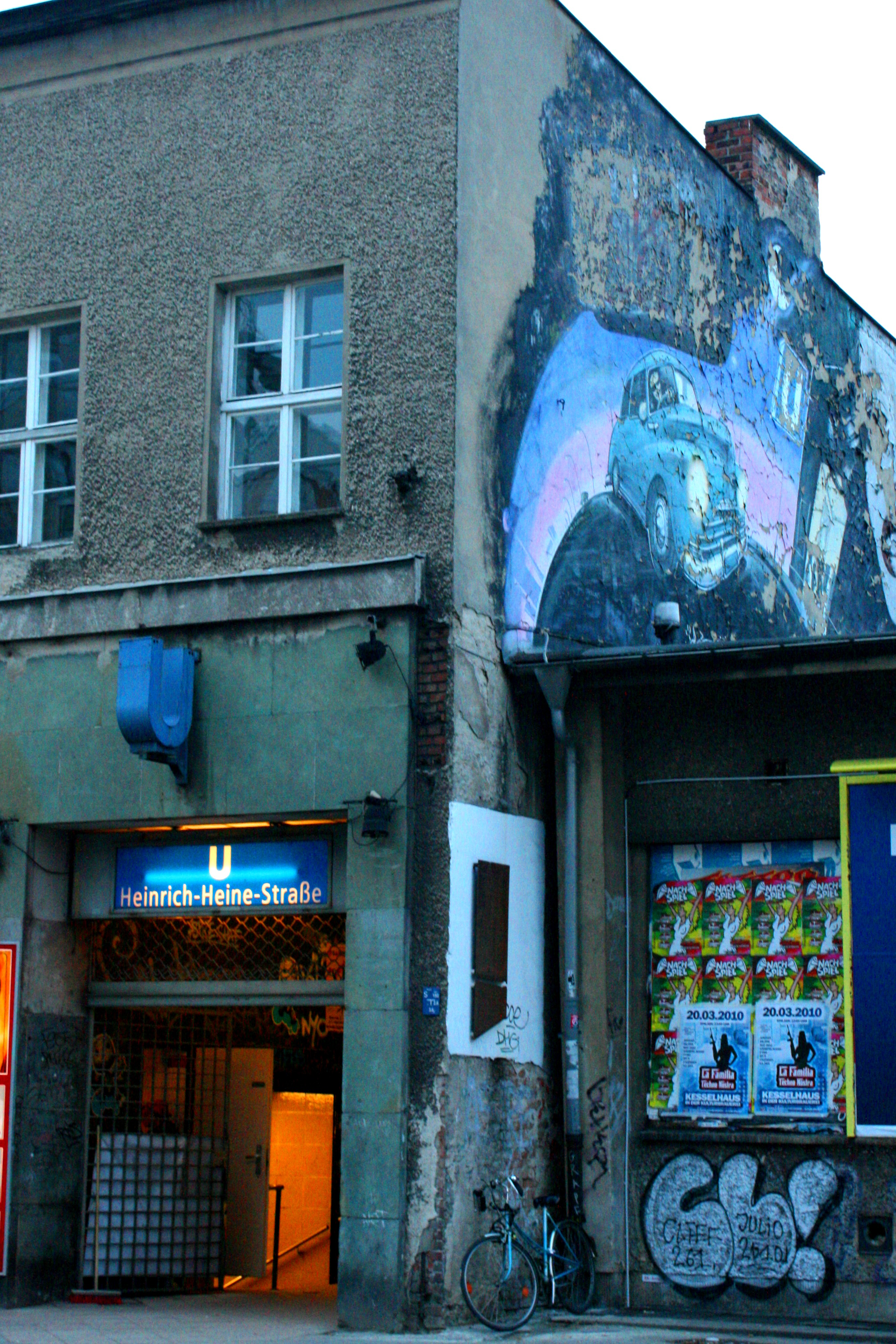
Köpenicker Straße entrance and landmark building

The station lies at "one and a half depth" because it is under buildings. Like many Berlin U-Bahn stations, it has an island platform and entrances at both ends, north and south. All are stairways; the station has no lift. One of the two northern entrances is incorporated into a building on the corner of Köpenicker Straße, with offices and flats above. This building is also protected as an architectural landmark. The other northern entrance and the southern entrance, at the corner of Schmidstraße, were also formerly incorporated into buildings, one of the models being entrances to London Underground stations; Neanderstraße was then unusually narrow and this line was the first use in Berlin of entrances set into buildings. The other buildings were destroyed in World War II and those stairs have since led directly from the street.

Following the fall of Berlin, the U-Bahn was closed at the end of April 1945. Service resumed at Neanderstraße on 3 June that year. Mitte was within the Soviet zone which became East Berlin; the station was renamed Heinrich-Heine-Straße on 31 August 1960 following a decision by the Berlin Magistrat on 22 July to rename the street. After the construction of the Berlin Wall a year later, on 13 August 1961, U-Bahn trains on Lines C and D (U6 and U8) no longer stopped in East Berlin and Heinrich-Heine-Straße became one of the ghost stations. The entrances were blocked up and the stairwell enclosures removed so that they were no longer visible. Use did not resume until German reunification almost 30 years later, on 1 July 1990. East Berlin U-Bahn stairway enclosures were built in early 1990 for the entrances from the street. Because of the long closure, the station retains much of its original appearance: 3 platform kiosks, direction indicators, nameplates (black with white lettering on this line; Grenander believed this made them easier to read), wooden poster frames, and wrought iron exit gates.

The Sage Club, a Berlin dance club, has operated since 1997 in the disused station mezzanine level in the Köpenicker Straße building.

Preceding station	Berlin U-Bahn	Following station
Jannowitzbrücke towards Wittenau	U8	Moritzplatz towards Hermannstraße
