= Franz-Neumann-Platz station =

Station of the Berlin U-Bahn

Coordinates: 52°33′53″N 13°21′50″E

Wall inside the station, with tree design intended to evoke the park at the Schäfersee

Franz-Neumann-Platz (Am Schäfersee) is a Berlin U-Bahn station located on the U8.

Opened in 1987 and built by R. G. Rümmler, the station was originally supposed to be named Schäfersee. However, politicians convinced the BVG to use the name of a famous SPD chairman.

Platform view

== Notes ==
Preceding station	Berlin U-Bahn	Following station
Residenzstraße towards Wittenau	U8	Osloer Straße towards Hermannstraße
