= Jannowitz Bridge =

Bridge in Berlin

Jannowitz Bridge Jannowitzbrücke
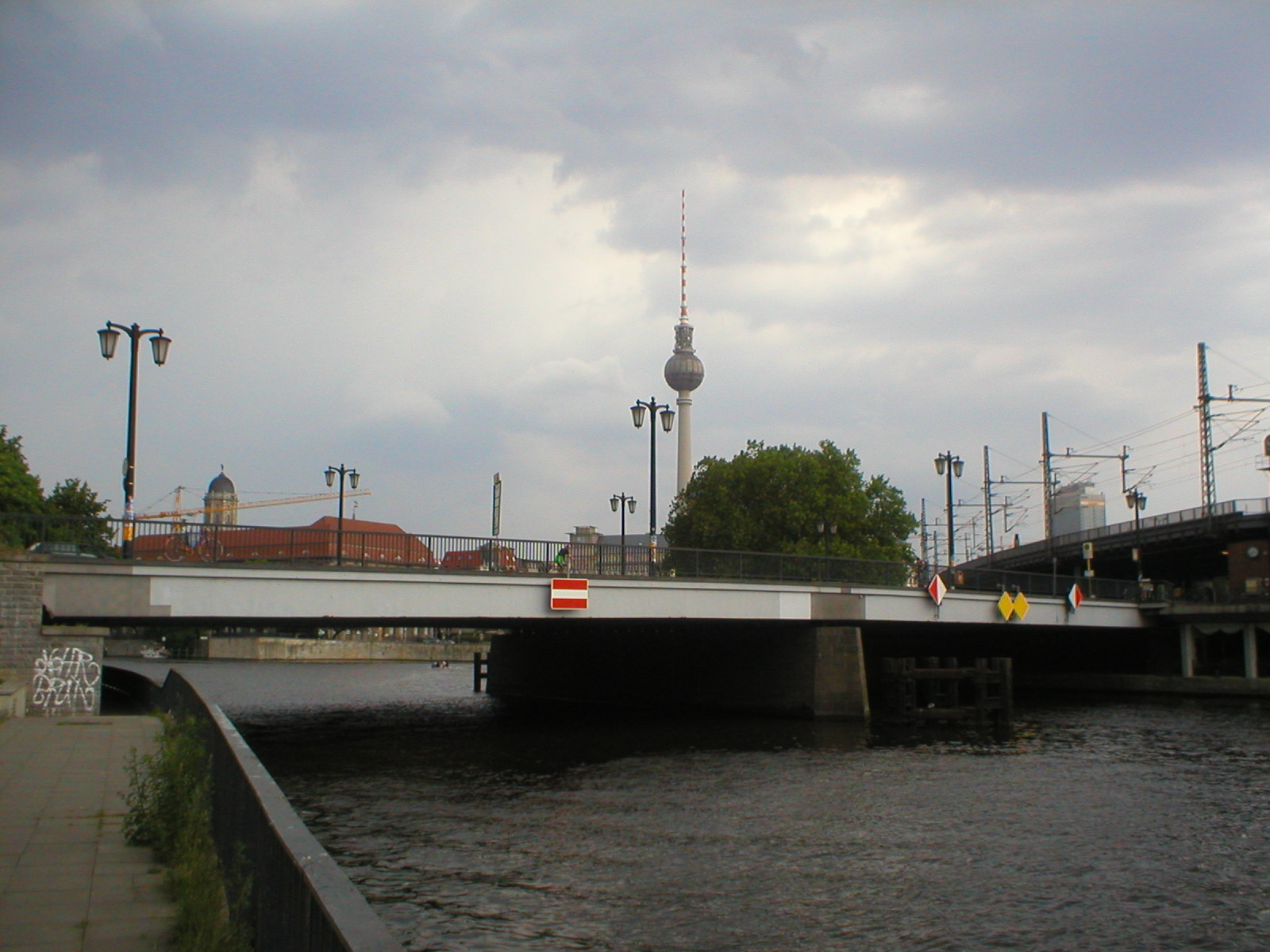
- Jannowitz Bridge
- Coordinates: 52°30′52″N 13°25′04″E
- Crosses: Spree River
- Named for: Christian August Jannowitz

Jannowitz Bridge (German: Jannowitzbrücke) is a bridge over the Spree River in Berlin. The bridge connects Heinrich Heine Straße and Brückenstraße in Mitte with Alexanderplatz.

== History ==
The bridge was built by cotton manufacturer Christian August Jannowitz. Construction of the bridge began in 1822. The bridge was originally a wooden structure and was replaced in 1881 by an iron truss bridge.

Jannowitz Bridge was dismantled in 1927 to allow construction of the U8 subway line. It was replaced with a new iron girder bridge that opened in 1932, along with the Jannowitzbrücke U-Bahn station. The bridge was destroyed by the Germans, as a "defensive measure", during the Battle of Berlin in World War II. The bridge was rebuilt again in the early 1950s.
