= Paracelsus-Bad station =

Station of the Berlin U-Bahn

Coordinates: 52°34′27″N 13°20′57″E

U-Bahn Station Paracelsus-Bad

Paracelsus-Bad is a Berlin U-Bahn station located on the U8. Designed by R.G. Rümmler and opened in 1987, it was named after the philosopher Paracelsus and the nearby bath bearing his name. The walls are covered with white tiles and black borders, and also several pictures with bathing scenes. The columns are also covered with black and white panels, playing with old architecture of baths.

Preceding station	Berlin U-Bahn	Following station
Lindauer Allee towards Wittenau	U8	Residenzstraße towards Hermannstraße
