= Pankstraße station =

Station of the Berlin U-Bahn

Coordinates: 52°33′08″N 13°22′54″E

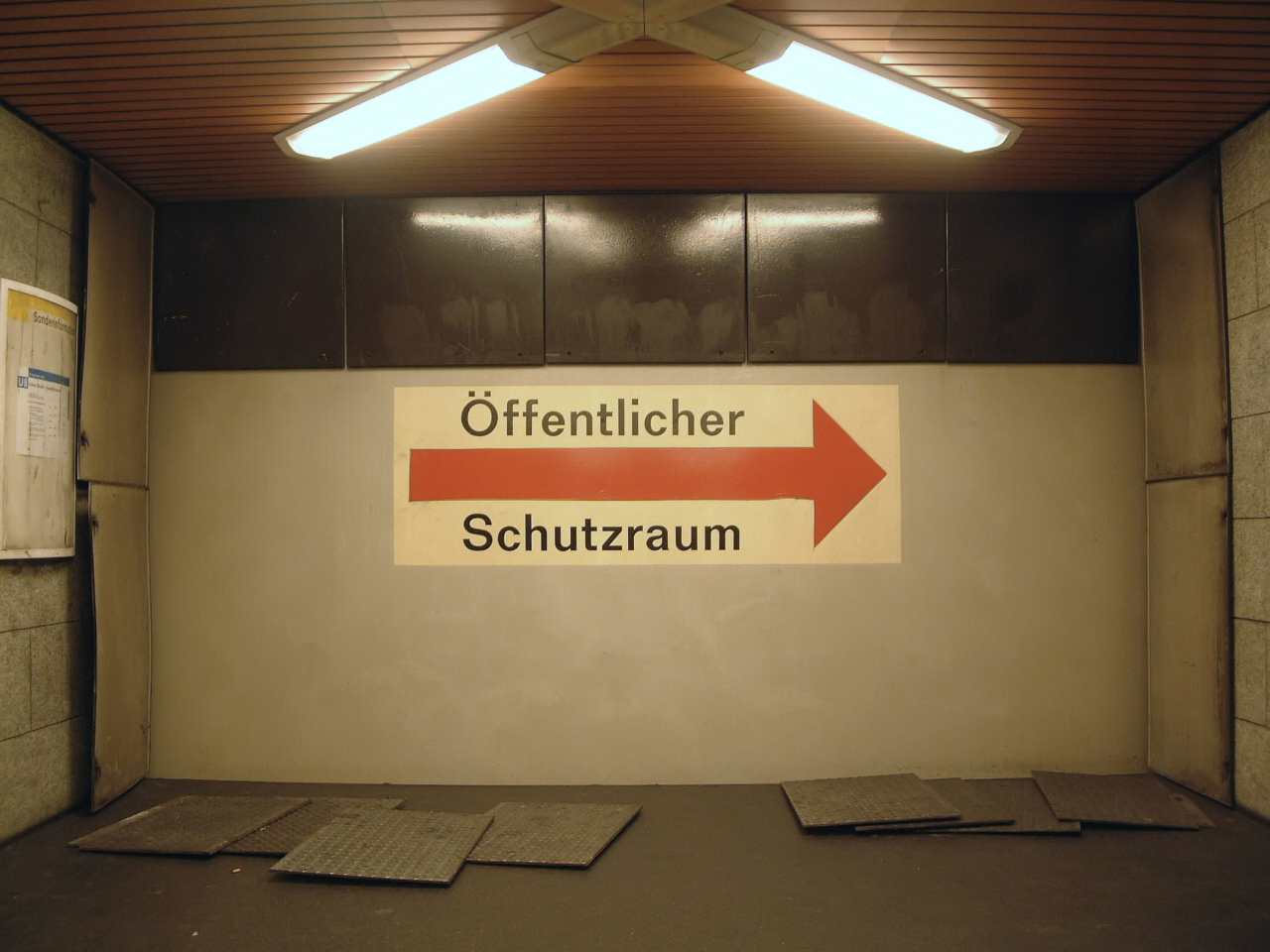
Main entrance of the station, configured as a fallout shelter

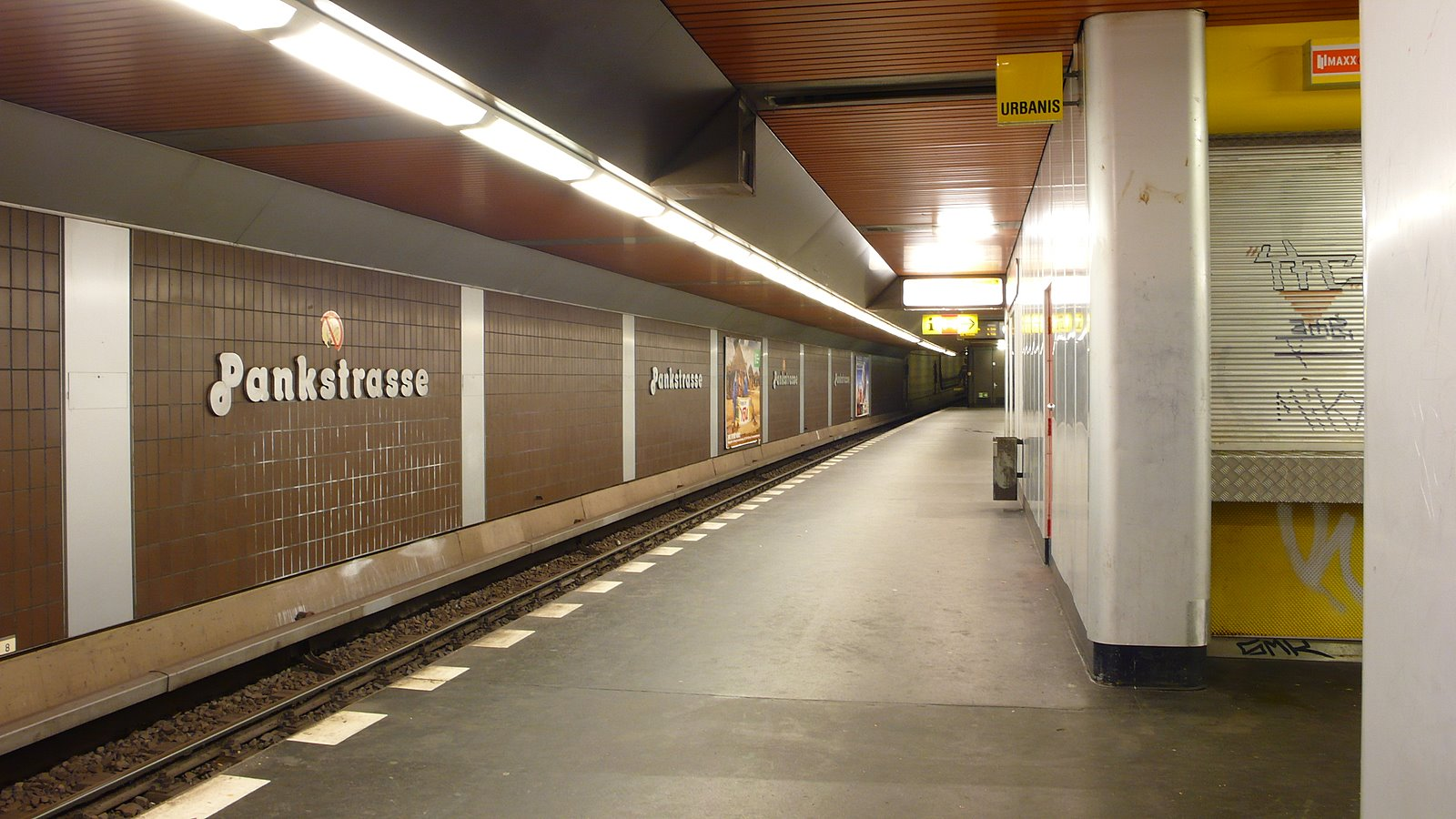
Platform view

Pankstraße is a Berlin U-Bahn station located on the U8. It was opened on 5 October 1977 (Rümmler) with the line's extension from Gesundbrunnen to Osloer Straße. The station's name derives from its location: It sits under the intersection of Pankstraße and Badstraße.

The actual spelling of the station's name is under debate. The German orthographic rules call for the spelling "Pankstraße", but the signs inside the station spell "Pankstrasse", acceptable if in capital letters, but not in lower case as used.

Like the station Siemensdamm (Berlin U-Bahn), the station is constructed as a "Multi Purpose Facility". It is prepared and partially stocked to be used as a fallout shelter. It has an emergency kitchen and a filtered ventilation system. It is specified to sustain 3339 people for 14 days.

Preceding station	Berlin U-Bahn	Following station
Osloer Straße towards Wittenau	U8	Gesundbrunnen towards Hermannstraße
