= Residenzstraße station =

Station of the Berlin U-Bahn

Coordinates: 52°34′16″N 13°21′38″E

U-Bahn station Residenzstraße

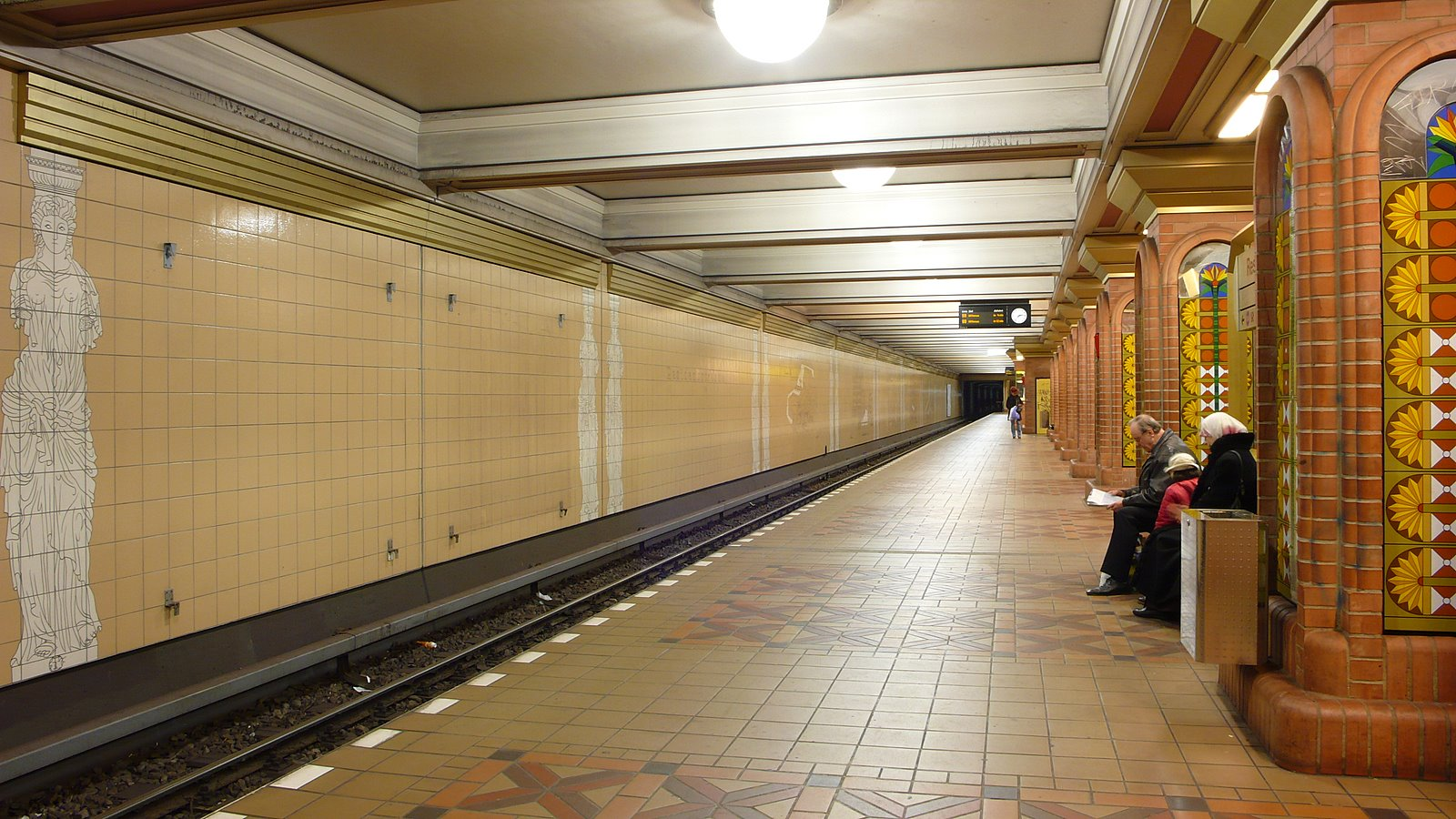
Platform view

Residenzstraße is a Berlin U-Bahn station located on the U8. Opened in 1987 and designed by R. G. Rümmler, this station was designed to resemble a palace, the Berliner Stadtschloss. With ornaments on the floor, pompous columns, mirrors and golden capitals this was accomplished (and very expensive). The motifs on the walls show plans of Berlin, the old Stadtschloss and parts of Berlin.

Preceding station	Berlin U-Bahn	Following station
Paracelsus-Bad towards Wittenau	U8	Franz-Neumann-Platz towards Hermannstraße
