= Lindauer Allee station =

Station of the Berlin U-Bahn

Coordinates: 52°34′31″N 13°20′21″E

Platform of the subway station

Lindauer Allee is a Berlin U-Bahn station located on the U8 in Berlin, Germany. Designed by Rainer G. Rümmler, the station opened on 24 September 1994, as part of the extension of the U8 to Wittenau. The station is tiled in green, violet, light blue and yellow with trees depicted on the walls as a reference to road's name Lindau where Lindenbaum = lime tree, Lindau is a town at Lake Constance. Mentionable is the gallery with the balustrade from where the whole station is visible. The only similar galleried view in Berlin is at the station Rathaus Spandau.

Preceding station	Berlin U-Bahn	Following station
Karl-Bonhoeffer-Nervenklinik towards Wittenau	U8	Paracelsus-Bad towards Hermannstraße
