= Boddinstraße station =

Station of the Berlin U-Bahn

Coordinates: 52°28′49″N 13°25′31″E

Boddinstraße
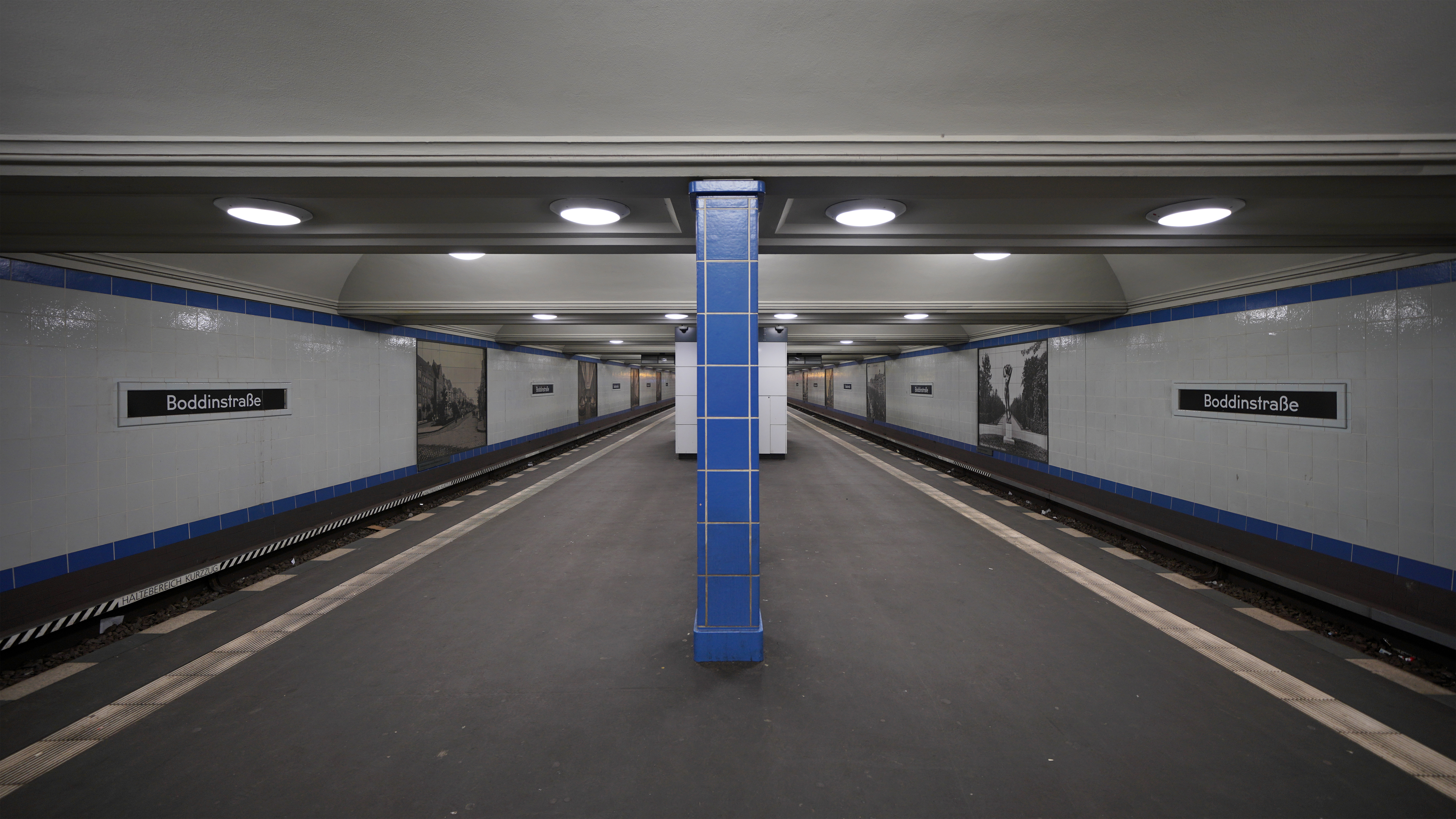
- Platform view of Boddinstraße

General information
- Location: Boddinstraße; Neukölln
- Owner: Berliner Verkehrsbetriebe
- Operator: Berliner Verkehrsbetriebe
- Platforms: 1 island platform
- Tracks: 2
- Train operators: Berliner Verkehrsbetriebe
- Connections: 104 166

Construction
- Structure type: Underground

Other information
- Fare zone: VBB: Berlin A/5555

History
- Opened: 17 July 1927; 99 years ago

Services
Preceding station	Berlin U-Bahn	Following station
Hermannplatz towards Wittenau	U8	Leinestraße towards Hermannstraße
Location

Boddinstraße is a Berlin U-Bahn station located on the U8. It is located below Hermannstrasse at the intersection of Boddinstrasse in the Neukölln district. The station, opened in 1927, is one of the oldest on the line and is operated by the Berlin Transport Company (BVG) under the abbreviation Bo. The station's name comes from Hermann Boddin, mayor of the community from 1874 to 1907 and later the mayor of Rixdorf, today's district of Neukölln.

== History ==
Planning began in 1912 for an underground line along the course of what is now U8. After the initial stages were interrupted by World War I, the work progressed in the mid-1920s. The architects of the stations were Alfred Grenander and Alfred Fehse. The basic structure of the static was based on the underground stations belonging to the North-South Railway (today's U6 line), which opened in 1923.

The station was opened on 17 July 1927. At that time trains could only go one station further to Leinestraße. By 1928 the line was extended to Hermannstraße. Grey tiles on the walls and blue tiles on the columns are the main attributes of this station.

Operations came to a standstill on 23 April 1945, following Allied bombing. Only three weeks later, operations resumed between Boddinstraße and Schönleinstraße. Three days later, it continued south to Leinestraße as well. The station was one of the first Berlin subway stations to reopen after the war.

The toilet facility closed in the 1960s and fell into disrepair. No institution would take responsibility, so neither modernization or demolition of the facility happened for a long time. Finally, it was demolished in 2007.

In 2012, the BVG announced a complete renovation of the station, including adjustments to make it accessible. On 29 November 2013 an elevator went into operation and the platform has been accessible since then.
