= Schönleinstraße station =

Station of the Berlin U-Bahn

Coordinates: 52°29′34″N 13°25′19″E

Schönleinstraße
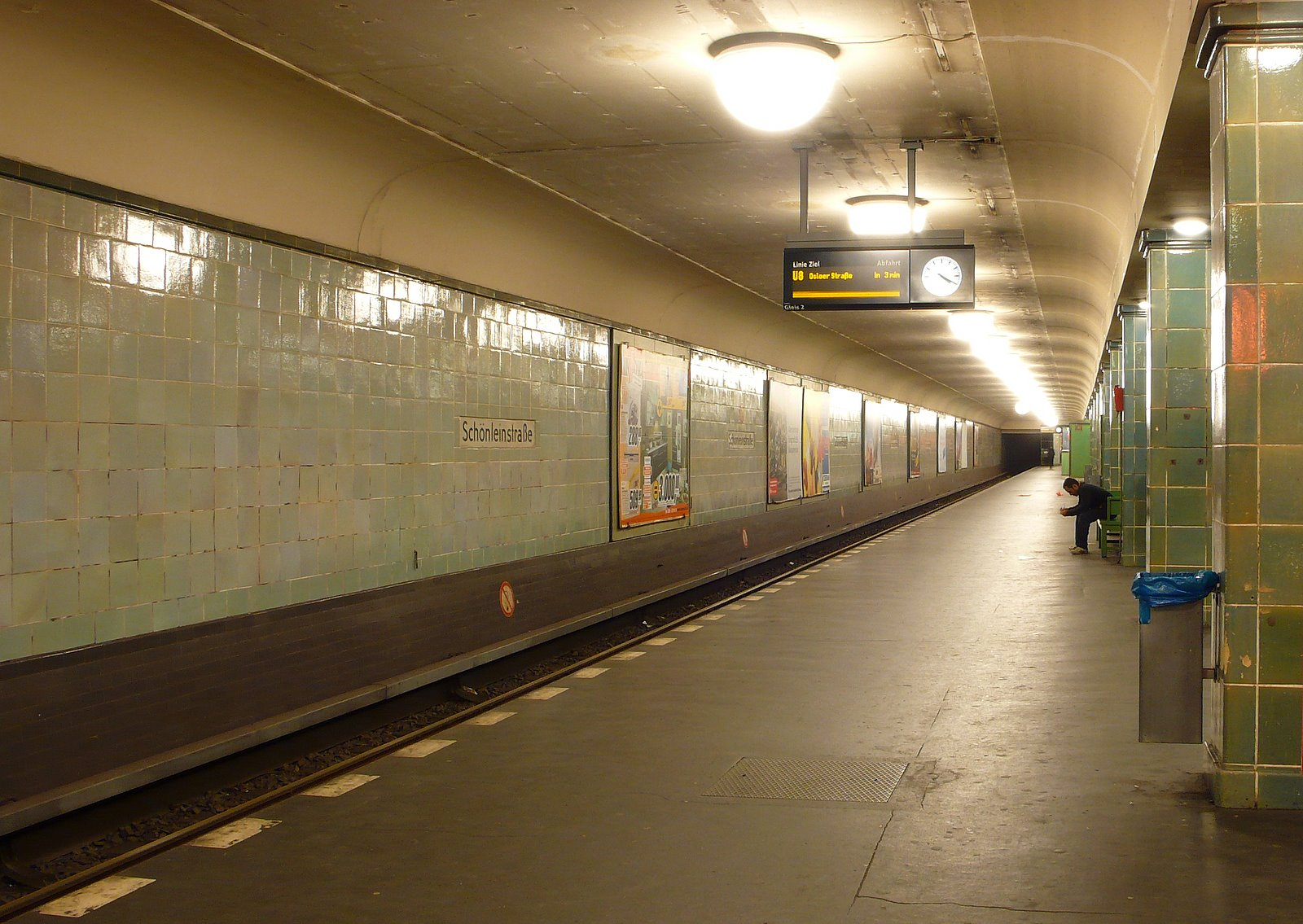

General information
- Other names: Kottbusser Damm
- Location: Friedrichshain-Kreuzberg; Germany
- Operator: BVG
- Line: U8
Location

Schönleinstraße is a Berlin U-Bahn station located on the U8. Opened in 1928 and designed by Alfred Grenander it was shortly closed in 1945 and renamed in 1951 to Kottbusser Damm. In 1992 the station was named Schönleinstrasse again.

On 25 December 2016, Deutsche Welle reported that a group of young men "attempted murder" on a homeless person at the Schönleinstraße station by setting him on fire. Two days later, the Wall Street Journal indicated seven youths were in police custody.

On 20 February 2019, at noon, another homeless person was attacked with a knife, but he was saved by bystanders. The attack was recorded on video.

| Preceding station | Berlin U-Bahn | Following station |
|---|---|---|
| Kottbusser Tor towards Wittenau | U8 | Hermannplatz towards Hermannstraße |
