= Leinestraße station =

Station of the Berlin U-Bahn

Coordinates: 52°28′25″N 13°25′41″E

Leinestraße
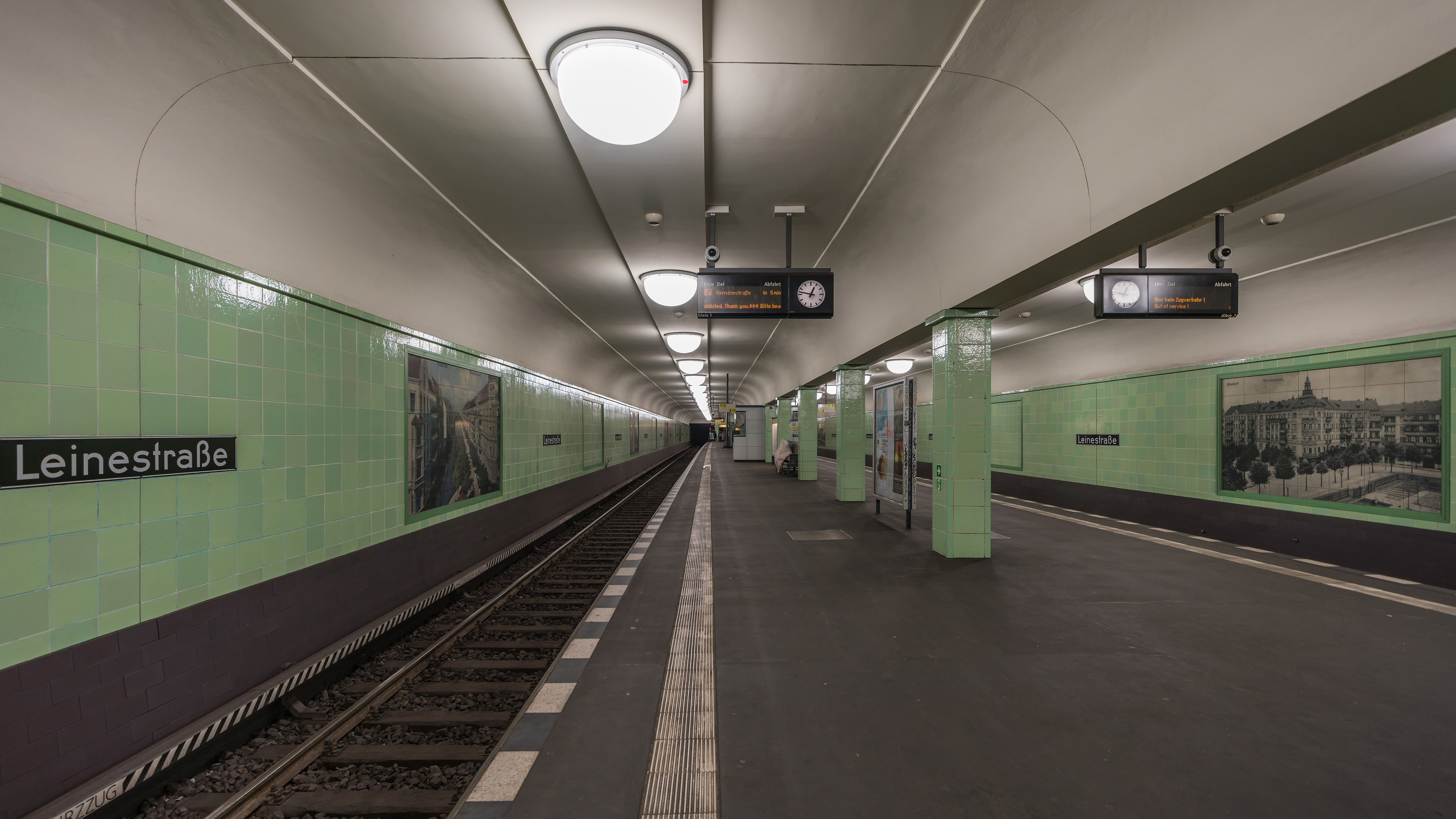
- Platform view of Leinestraße

General information
- Location: Leinestraße; Neukölln
- Owner: Berliner Verkehrsbetriebe
- Operator: Berliner Verkehrsbetriebe
- Platforms: 1 island platform
- Tracks: 2
- Train operators: Berliner Verkehrsbetriebe

Construction
- Structure type: Underground

Other information
- Fare zone: VBB: Berlin A/5555

History
- Opened: 4 August 1929; 97 years ago

Services
Preceding station	Berlin U-Bahn	Following station
Boddinstraße towards Wittenau	U8	Hermannstraße Terminus
Location

Leinestraße is a Berlin U-Bahn station located on the U8 line.

The station was built by Alfred Grenander and A. Fehse in 1929. In the 1930s the southern tunnel was extended towards Hermanstraße for the then-uncompleted extension of the U-Bahn to Hermanstraße. During World War II the tunnel served as air raid shelter.

In the 1960s the extended tunnel was used by Berlin Transport for parking of disused subway trains.

In 1996, the subway station at Hermanstraße was finally completed so travelers now have direct access to the Berlin S-Bahn one stop after Leinestrasse.

The color of this station is light green, with green tiles on the walls.
