= Kottbusser Tor station =

Station of the Berlin U-Bahn

Kottbusser Tor
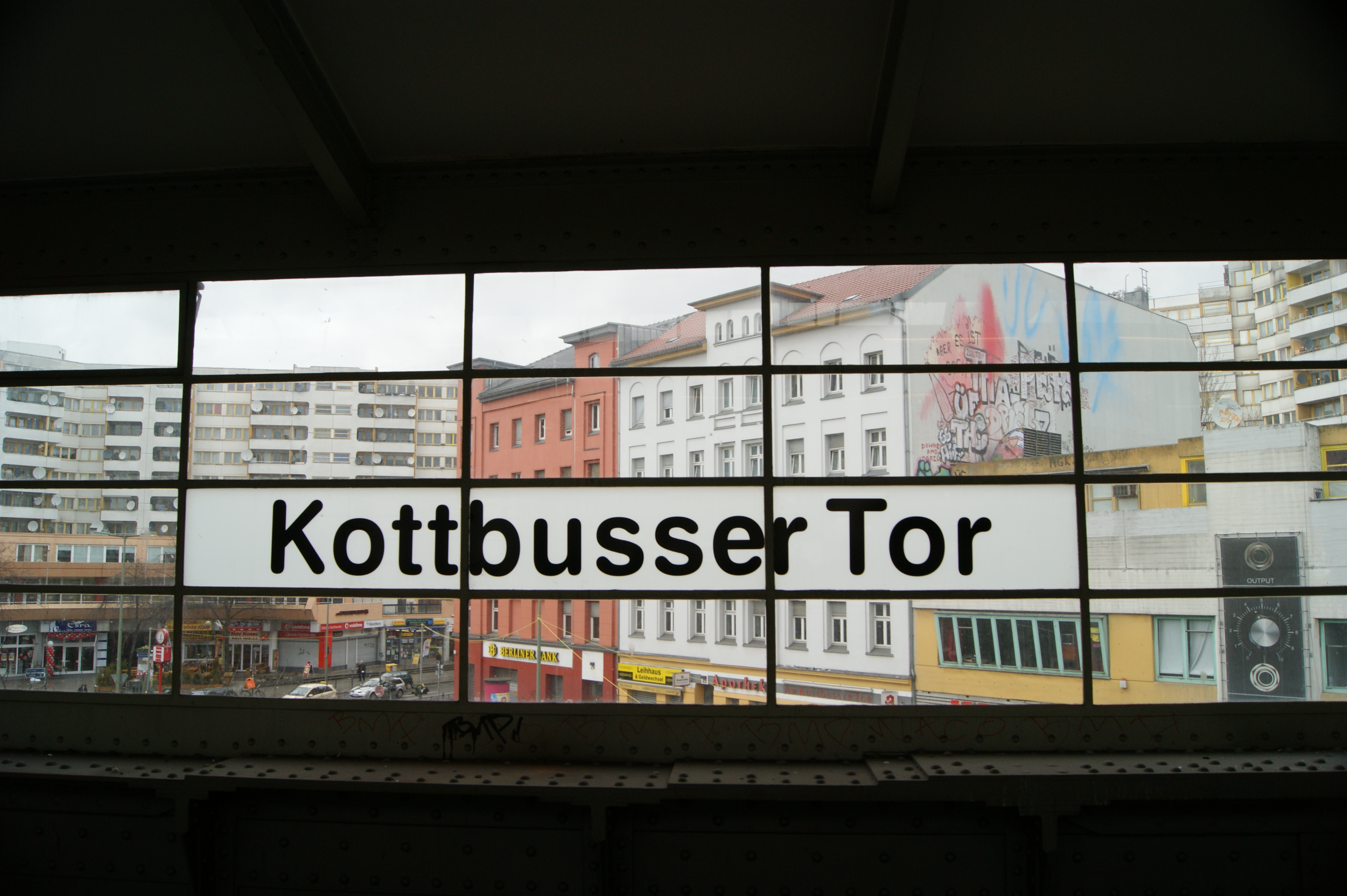

General information
- Location: Kottbusser Tor; Kreuzberg, Berlin; Germany
- Coordinates: 52°29′57″N 13°25′05″E
- Owner: Berliner Verkehrsbetriebe
- Operator: Berliner Verkehrsbetriebe
- Platforms: 2 island platforms
- Tracks: 4
- Connections: : 140, N1, N8

Construction
- Structure type: Elevated (U1/U3); Underground (U8)
- Cycle facilities: Yes
- Accessible: Yes

Other information
- Fare zone: : Berlin A/5555

History
- Opened: 15 February 1902; 124 years ago (U1/3 level); 12 February 1928; 98 years ago (U8 level)

Services
Preceding station	Berlin U-Bahn	Following station
Prinzenstraße towards Uhlandstraße	U1	Görlitzer Bahnhof towards Warschauer Straße
Prinzenstraße towards Krumme Lanke	U3	Görlitzer Bahnhof towards Warschauer Straße
Moritzplatz towards Wittenau	U8	Schönleinstraße towards Hermannstraße
Route map
U1/U3 station
U8 station
Location
- Location within Berlin

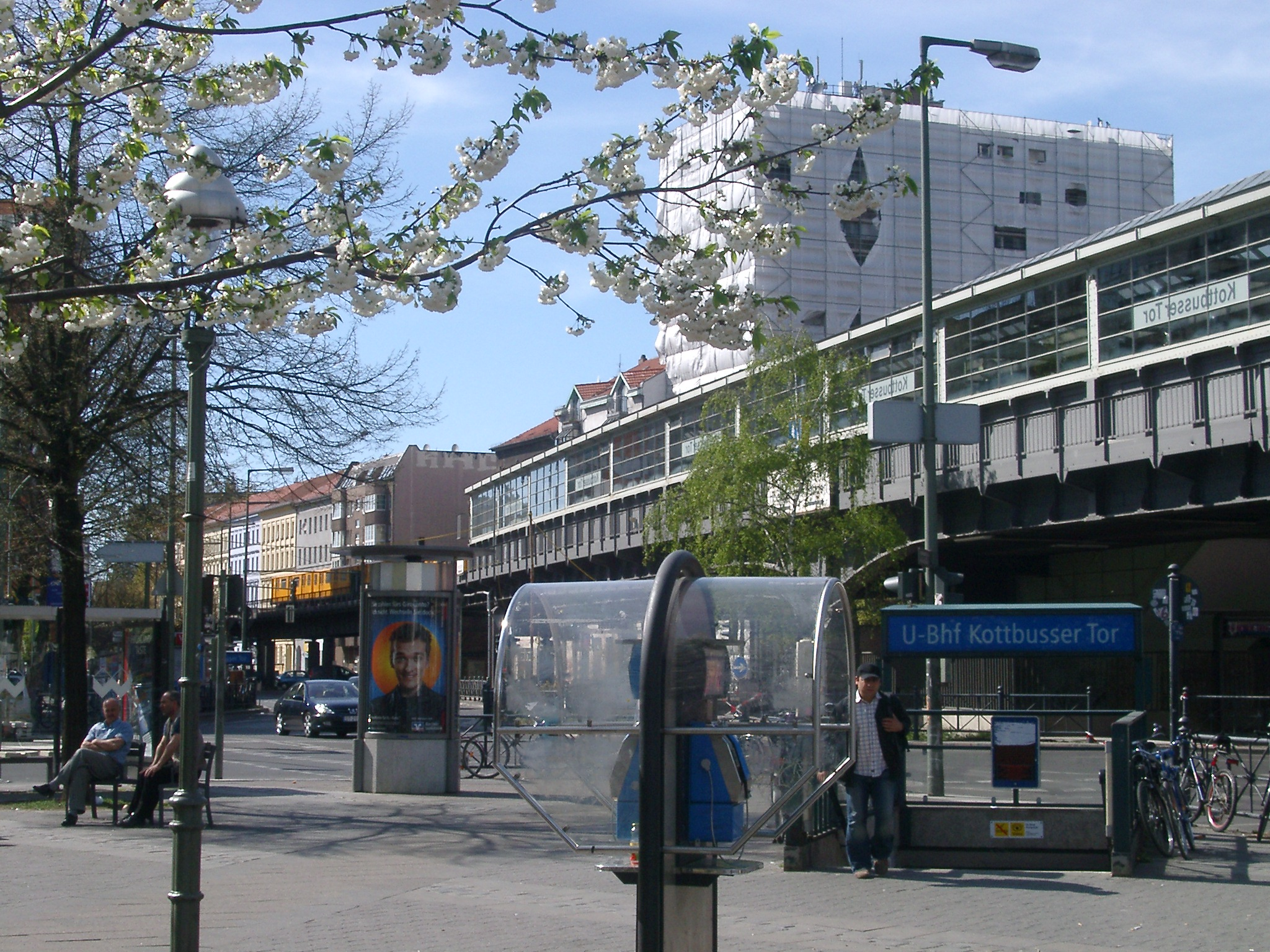
Kottbusser Tor station

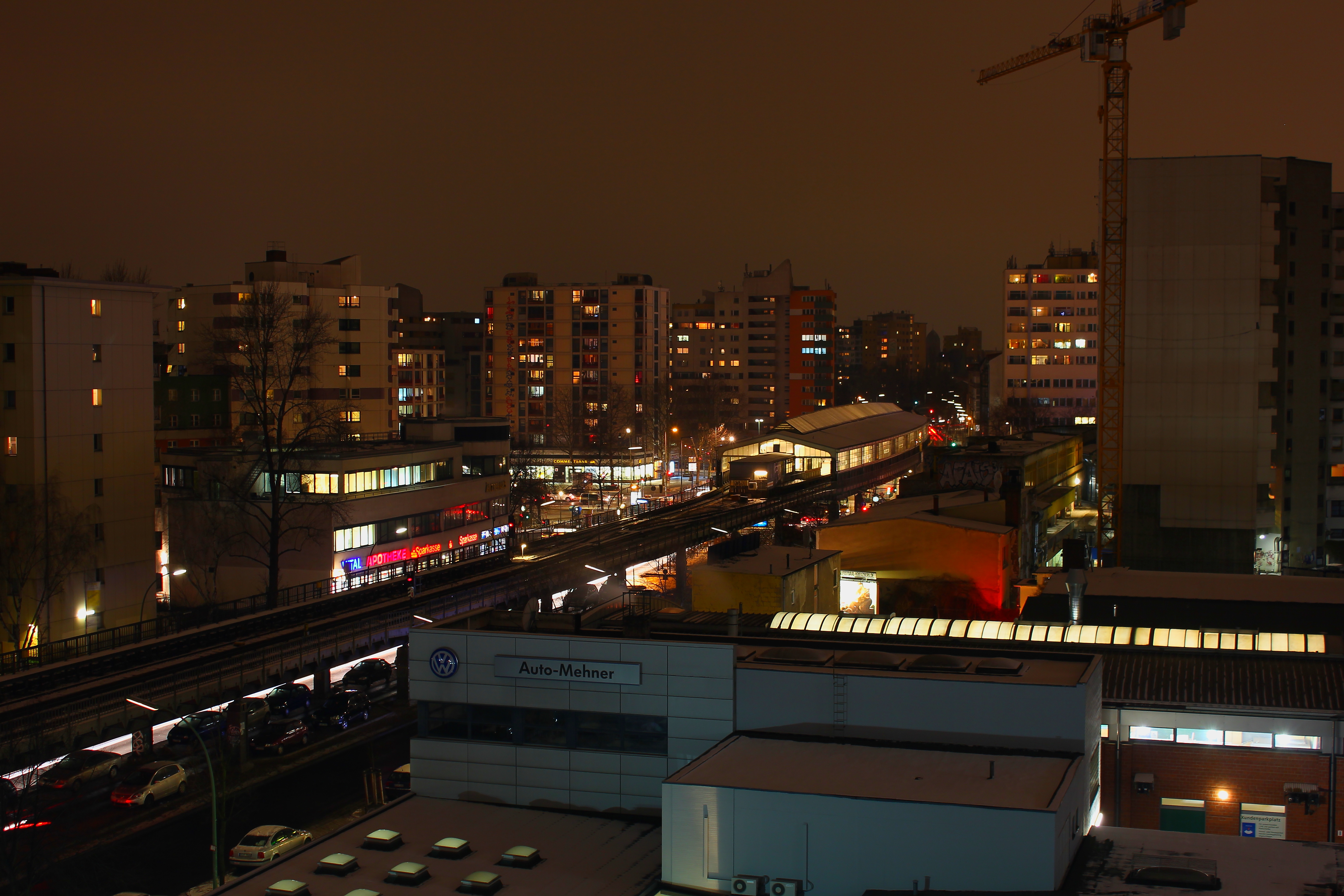
Kottbusser Tor station at night

Kottbusser Tor (German pronunciation: [ˌkɔtbʊsɐ ˈtoːɐ̯]) is a Berlin U-Bahn station located on lines U1, U3, and U8. Many Berliners use the affectionate term Kotti (German pronunciation: [ˈkɔti]; see Berlin dialect).

It is located in central Kreuzberg. The area has a bad reputation for the relatively high, mainly drug-related crime rate, instances of which have recently become quite rare in most other parts of the district. The original Kottbusser Tor was a southern city gate of Berlin; the road through the gate led via the Neukölln suburb to the town of Cottbus.

== History ==
The station on the first U-Bahn line from Potsdamer Platz to Stralauer Tor was opened on 18 February 1902 on a viaduct above Skalitzer Straße. When the U8 was built in 1926, a new two-level station was constructed 100 metres (330 ft) westwards to allow both lines to meet in one location, and the original station was demolished. The former site of the old side platform station is currently utilized by a pocket track.

On August 29, 1940, a bomb from a World War II raid struck the U8 subway tunnel but did not explode.

== Gallery ==
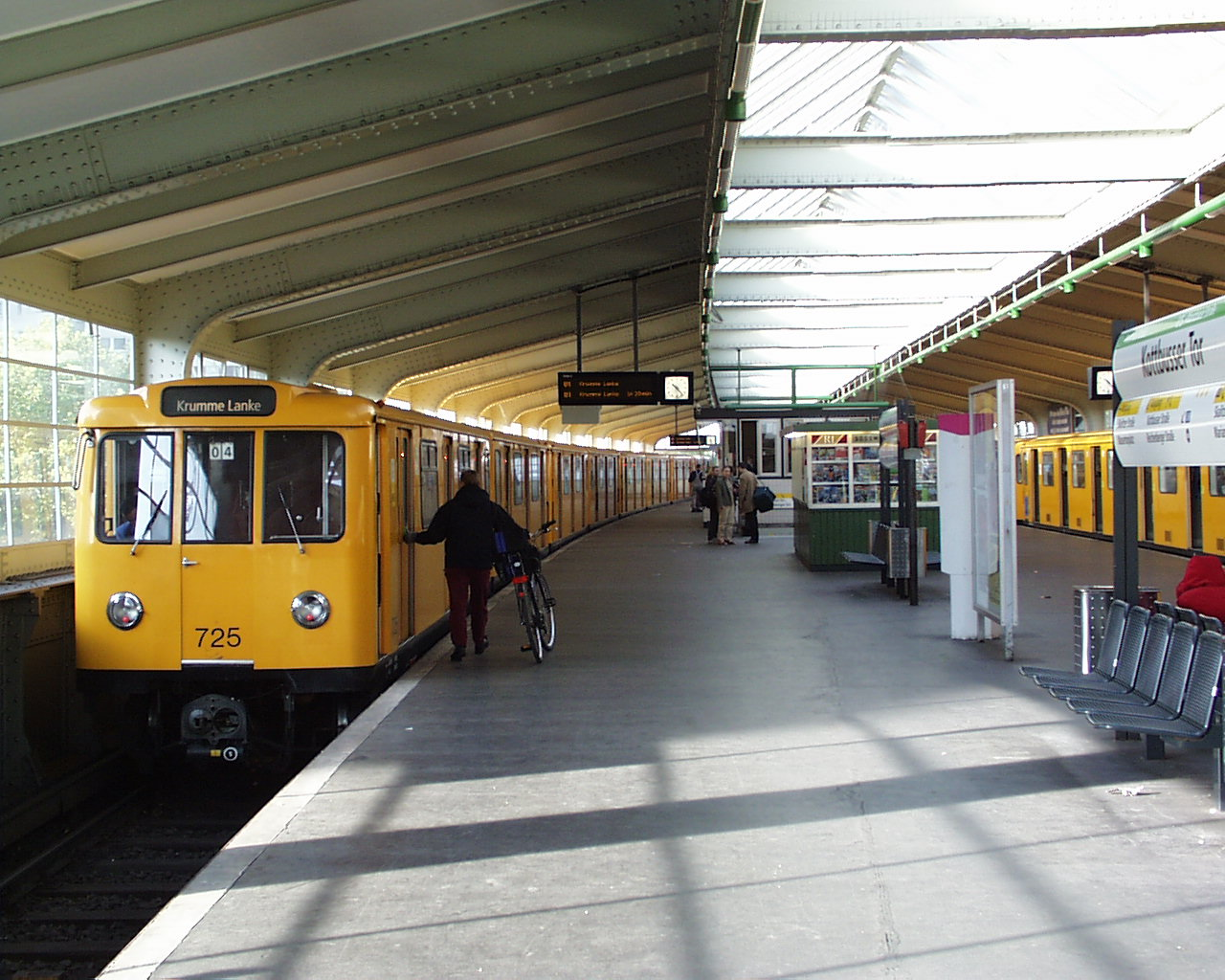
U1/U3 platform

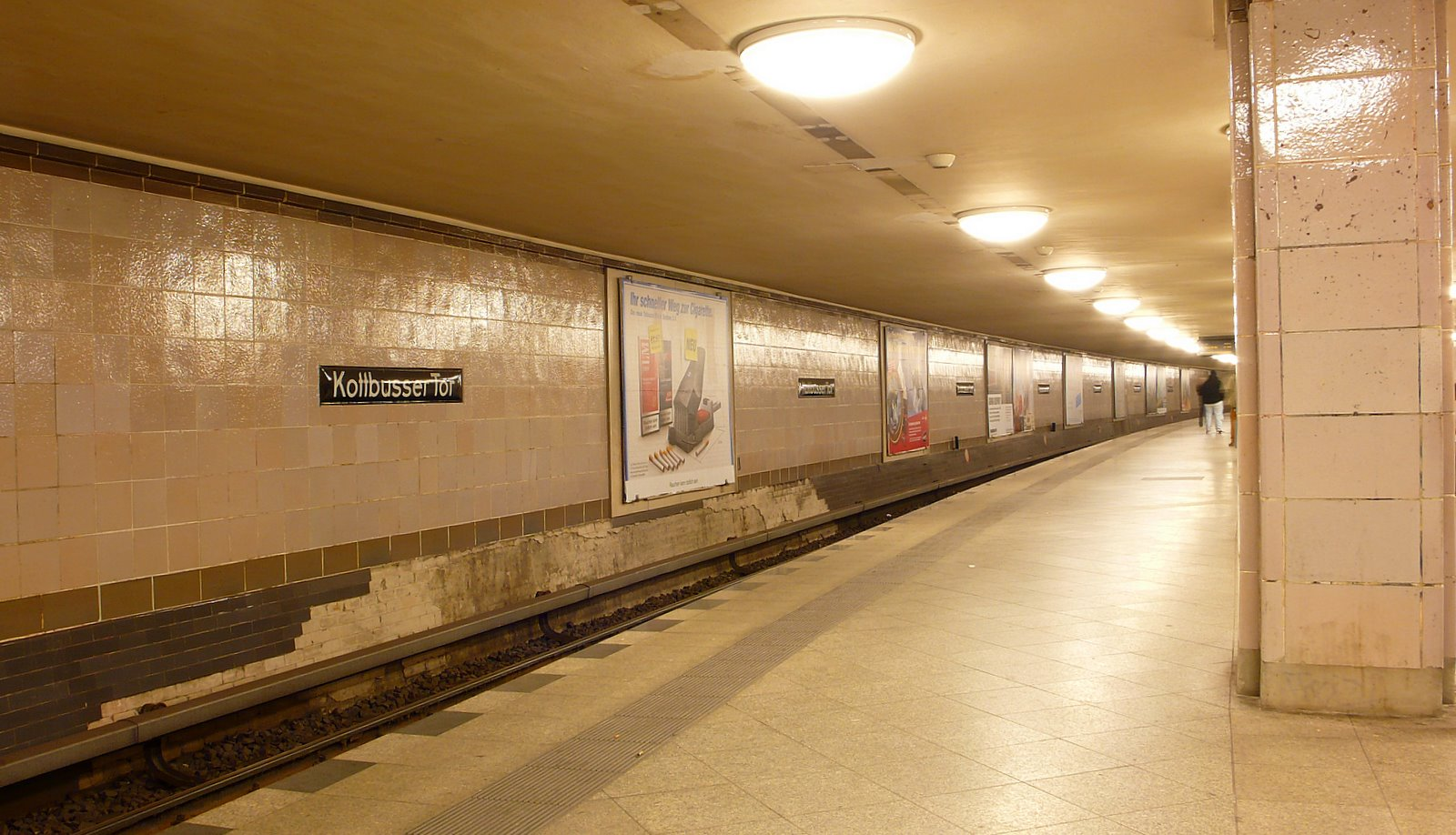
U8 platform

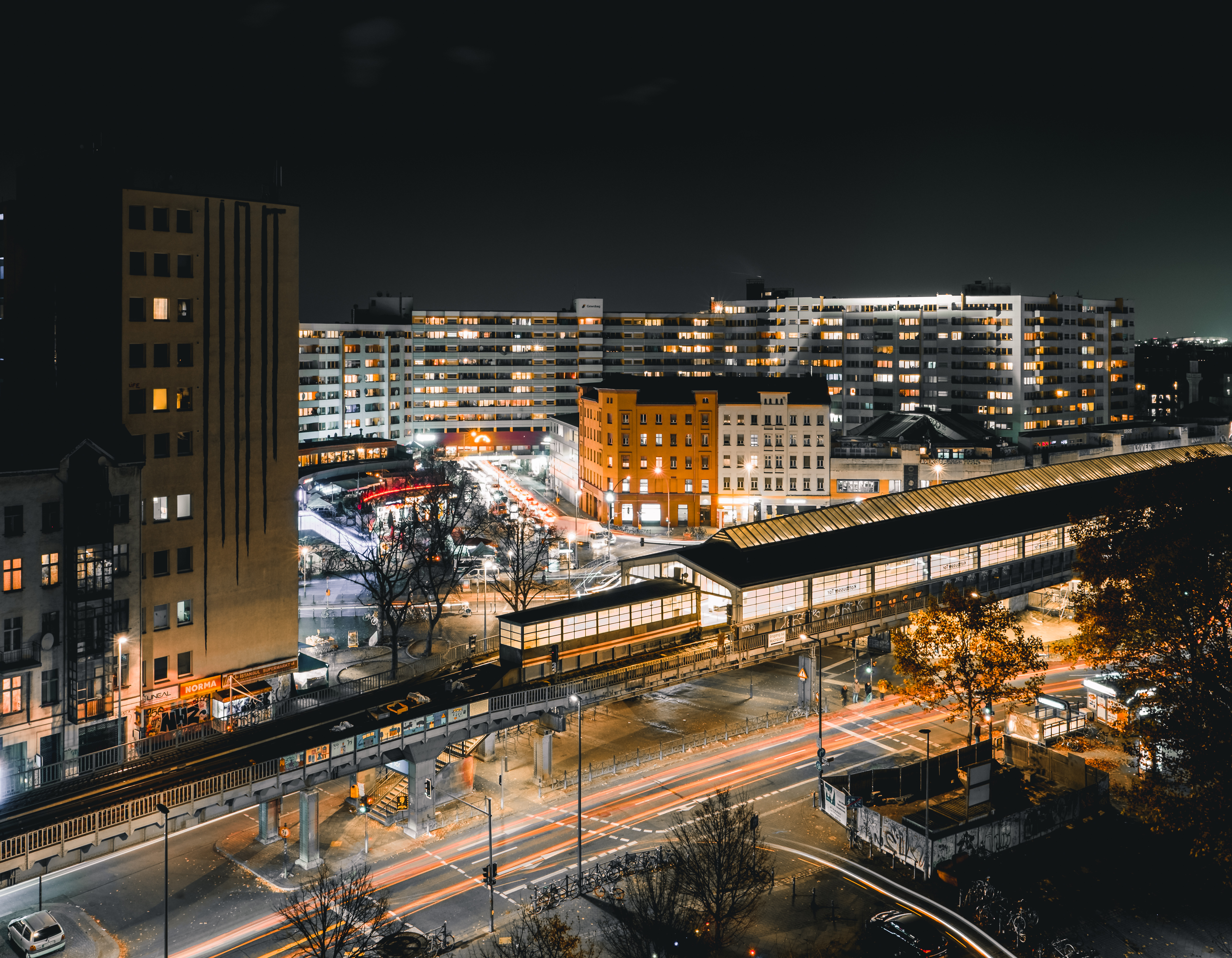
Kottbusser Tor station at night
