= Berlin-Wittenau station =

Railway station in Berlin, Germany

Coordinates: 52°35′45″N 13°20′12″E

Wittenau (Wilhelmsruher Damm)
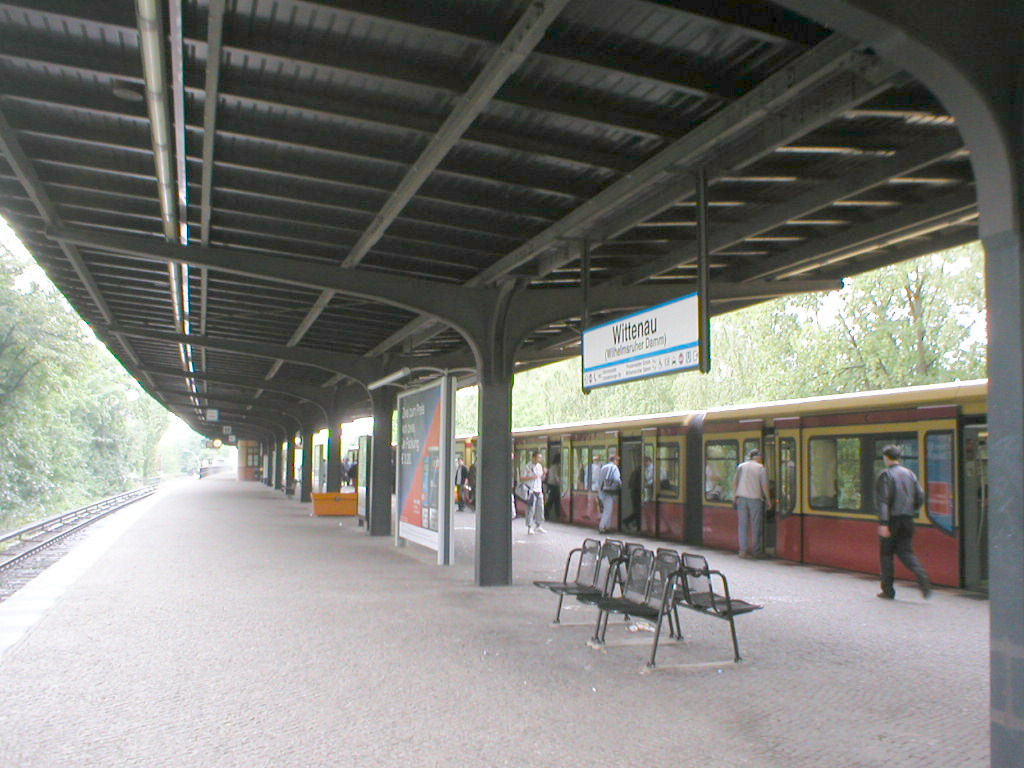
- S-Bahn platform

General information
- Other names: Berlin-Wittenau (Wilhelmsruher Damm)
- Location: Reinickendorf, Berlin, Berlin; Germany
- Lines: Nordbahn; U8
- Platforms: 1
- Tracks: 2

Construction
- Architect: Nordbahn: Ernst Schwartz, Karl Cornelius, Alfred Lücking : Rainer Rümmler

Other information
- Station code: 6824
- DS100 code: BWIN
- Category: 4
- Fare zone: VBB: Berlin B/5656

History
- Opened: Nordbahn: 10 July 1877; 149 years ago : 29 September 1994; 31 years ago
- Electrified: 5 June 1925; 101 years ago
- Former names: 1877-1893 Dalldorf; 1893-1906 Dalldorf (Nordbahn); 1906-1911 Wittenau (Nordbahn); 1911-1994 Wittenau (Nordb)

Services
Preceding station	Berlin S-Bahn	Following station
Waidmannslust towards Oranienburg	S1	Wilhelmsruh towards Wannsee
Waidmannslust Terminus	S85	Wilhelmsruh towards Grünau
Preceding station	Berlin U-Bahn	Following station
Terminus	U8	Rathaus Reinickendorf towards Hermannstraße
Location

Berlin-Wittenau (in German S-Bahnhof Berlin-Wittenau, officially Wittenau (Wilhelmsruher Damm)) is a railway station in the Wittenau district of Berlin, Germany. It is served by the Berlin S-Bahn and numerous local buses. It is also the northern terminus of the Berlin U-Bahn line U8.

== Overview ==
=== S-Bahn ===
The station was opened under the name Dalldorf (until 1905) along with the railway line on 10 July 1877. The track was still largely single track at the time, only in 1891, a second track was added. A second track pair was added in 1912 to separate the remote from suburban traffic. The suburban tracks were finally electrified in 1925 as the second route in the Berlin area with busbars, the S-Bahn arrived. After the Second World War, the track, including the station, was reduced by one track each. A turnout to cross the trains was not preserved, only one station further at the station Waidmannslust one was established. Due to the S-Bahn boycott as a result of the construction of the Berlin Wall many potential passengers avoided the S-Bahn and changed to the means of transport of the BVG, the operating Reichsbahn maintained the route and its facilities, but major investments were omitted.

With the assumption of the operating rights of the rapid-transit railway in West Berlin by the senate on 9 January 1984 the route was shut down immediately, if only for the time being. After protests of the passenger associations was in the same year, on 1 October 1984, the route between Gesundbrunnen and Frohnau used again. To increase the capacity of the northern section, this was again expanded to double track until 1986, bringing Wittenau his second track back. For the section north Waidmannslust was temporarily shut down in 1985. During this time, the south extended platform also got an exit to Wilhelmsruher dam to allow the transfer to the buses to Märkisches Viertel and also to the then still planned subway. At about the same time, the discussion started about the future name of the station. Decisive for this was the extension of the subway line U8, which should receive a train station in Wittenau. Since the plans were from the time before the takeover of the S-Bahn, the BVG chose for their subway station the name Wilhelmsruher Damm for deliberate demarcation. After 1984, this name was then intended for the S-Bahn station, but was not taken over. Only the addition Wilhelmsruher Damm adorns since the station signs.

=== U-Bahn ===
U-Bahn platform

The U-Bahn was planned to be extended to Märkisches Viertel which was supposed to be done in the 1960s. However, with the fall of the Berlin Wall, construction began for the extension to Wittenau. The U-Bahn station opened on 29 September 1994, with the northern continuation of the U8 line to reach the nearby housing estates of Märkisches Viertel. S- and U-Bahn station then received the appendix (Wilhelmsuher Damm), the main street leading to Märkisches Viertel. It retained this designation even after the former Wittenau (Kremmener Bahn) station was renamed Karl-Bonhoeffer-Nervenklinik on 28 May 1995.
