= Berlin S-Bahn =

Rapid transit railway system in and around Berlin

S-Bahn Berlin

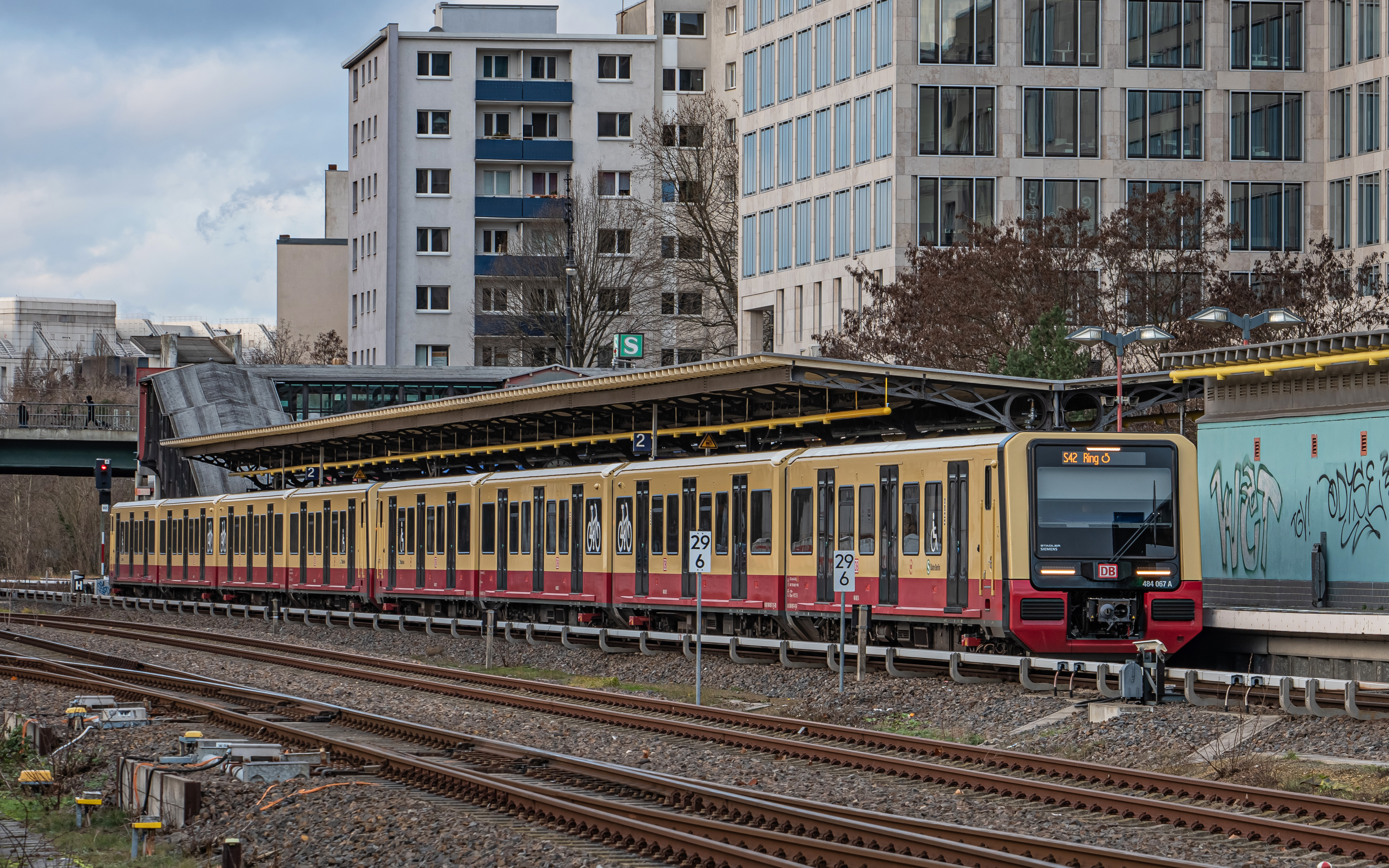
- Berlin-Halensee station with Ringbahn train, 2023

Overview
- Locale: Berlin
- Transit type: Rapid transit (S-Bahn)
- Number of lines: 15 (1 line under construction)
- Number of stations: 168
- Daily ridership: 1,400,000 (av. weekday, 2024)
- Annual ridership: 456 million (2024)
- Website: S-Bahn Berlin GmbH

Operation
- Began operation: 8 August 1924
- Operator: S-Bahn Berlin GmbH

Technical
- System length: 340 km (211 mi)
- Track gauge: 1,435 mm (4 ft 8 1/2 in) (standard)
- Electrification: 750 V DC Third rail
- Average speed: 40 km/h (25 mph)
System map

The Berlin S-Bahn (German: [ˈɛs baːn]) is a hybrid rapid transit and suburban rail system in Berlin. The modern incarnation of the system opened in December 1930, succeeding the special fare area Berliner Stadt-, Ring- und Vorortbahnen ('Berlin city, orbital, and suburban railways'). It complements the Berlin U-Bahn and is the primary transport link to many suburban areas, such as Berlin Brandenburg Airport. As such, the Berlin S-Bahn blends elements of a commuter rail service and a rapid transit system; in doing so, it lends its name to the pan-European family of S-Bahn urban transit systems.

In its first decades of operation, the trains were steam-drawn; even after the electrification of large parts of the network, some lines remained under steam. Today, the term S-Bahn is used in Berlin only for those lines and trains with third-rail electrical power transmission and the special Berlin S-Bahn loading gauge. The third unique technical feature of the Berlin S-Bahn, the automated mechanical train control (works very similar to the train stop at New York City Subway), is being phased out and replaced by a communications-based train control system specific to the Berlin S-Bahn.

Today, the Berlin S-Bahn is no longer defined as this special tariff area of the national railway company, but is instead just one specific means of transportation, defined by its special technical characteristics, in an area-wide tariff administered by a public transport authority. The Berlin S-Bahn is now an integral part of the Verkehrsverbund Berlin-Brandenburg, the regional tariff zone for all kinds of public transit in and around Berlin and the federal state (Bundesland) of Brandenburg.

== Introduction ==
The brand name S-Bahn chosen in 1930 mirrored U-Bahn, which had become the official brand name for the Berlin city-owned rapid transit lines begun under the name of Berliner Hoch- und Untergrundbahnen ('Berlin elevated and underground lines'), where the word of mouth had abbreviated Untergrundbahn to U-Bahn, in parallel to U-Boot formed from Unterseeboot ('undersea boat' – submarine). Ironically, S-Bahn's S is not easy to name, it may stand for Schnell-Bahn ('rapid rail') or Stadt-Bahn ('urban rail'; not to be confused with the Berlin Stadtbahn, a railway viaduct through central Berlin on which some Berlin S-Bahn lines run, or Stadtbahn, the German term for light rail).

Services on the Berlin S-Bahn have been provided by the Prussian or German national railway company of the respective time, which means the Deutsche Reichsbahn-Gesellschaft after the First World War, the state-owned East German Deutsche Reichsbahn (in both East and West Berlin) until 1993 (except West Berlin from 1984 to 1994, the BVG period) and Deutsche Bahn after its incorporation in 1994.

The Berlin S-Bahn consists today of 16 lines serving 166 stations, and runs over a total route length of 332 kilometres (206 mi). The S-Bahn carried 478.1 million passengers in 2018. It is integrated with the mostly underground U-Bahn to form the backbone of Berlin's rapid transport system. Unlike the U-Bahn, the S-Bahn crosses Berlin city limits into the surrounding state of Brandenburg, e.g. to Potsdam.

Although the S- and U-Bahn are part of a unified fare system, they have different operators. The S-Bahn is operated by S-Bahn Berlin GmbH, a subsidiary of Deutsche Bahn, whereas the U-Bahn is run by Berliner Verkehrsbetriebe (BVG), the main public transit company for the city of Berlin.

== Operation ==
=== Network ===
The S-Bahn routes all feed into one of three core lines: a central, elevated east–west line (the Stadtbahn), a central, mostly underground north–south line (the Nord–Süd Tunnel), and a circular line (the Ringbahn). Outside the Ringbahn, suburban routes radiate in all directions.

Lines S1, S2, S25, and S26 are north–south lines that use the north–south tunnel as their midsection. They were equally distributed into Oranienburg, Bernau, and Hennigsdorf in the north, and Teltow Stadt, Lichtenrade, and Wannsee.

Lines S3, S5, S7, S9, and S75 are east–west lines using the Stadtbahn cross-city railway. The western termini are located at Potsdam and Spandau, although the S5 only runs as far as Westkreuz and the S75 to Warschauer Straße. The eastern termini are Erkner, Strausberg Nord, Ahrensfelde, and Wartenberg. The S9 uses a connector curve (Südkurve) at Ostkreuz to switch from the Stadtbahn to the south-eastern leg of the Ringbahn. Another curve, the Nordkurve to the north-eastern Ringbahn, was originally served by the S86 line, but it was demolished in preparation of the rebuilding of Ostkreuz station and was not rebuilt afterwards. Both connector curves were heavily used in the time of the Berlin Wall, as trains coming from the north-eastern routes couldn't use the West Berlin north–south route and the Southern leg of the pre- and post-Wall Ringbahn was in West Berlin.

Lines S41 and S42 continuously circle around the Ringbahn, the former clockwise, the latter anti-clockwise. Lines S45, S46, and S47 link destinations in the southeast with the southern section of the Ringbahn via the tangential link from the Görlitzer Bahn to the Ring via Köllnische Heide.

Lines S8 and S85 are north–south lines using the eastern section of the Ringbahn between Bornholmer Straße and Treptower Park via Ostkreuz, using the Görlitzer Bahn in the South.

Formerly, there existed four curves at Westkreuz and Ostkreuz allowing to go to a northern ring (Nordring) and to a southern ring (Südring) using central tracks of Stadbahn. Nordring and Südring are common terms, but never scheduled routes as separate rings. One curve of Südring at Westkreuz left over for internal use, the other one is mentioned connector at Ostkreuz.

Since 9 January 1984, all the West Berlin S-Bahn routes are labelled with an "S" followed by a number. This system had been in use with other West German S-Bahn systems (such as Hamburg) for years. On 2 June 1991 this was extended to the East Berlin lines as well. Internally, the Berlin S-Bahn uses Zuggruppen (literally groups of trains) which normally run every twenty minutes (S41/S42 are an exception to this as their Zuggruppen run every 10 minutes). Some lines, e.g. the S85, are made up of only one Zuggruppe, while others, like S5, are actually multiple Zuggruppen combined. Some Zuggruppen do not run the entire line and terminate at intermediate stops. Zuggruppen are called by a Funkname (radio designator), which is derived from the German spelling alphabet. Some Funknamen are not used in regular service, such as Heinrich, Baikal, Jaguar, Gustav, or Saale (being used for special soccer service trains, usually running for fans under the line S3 between Charlottenburg and Olympiastadion).

Line	Zuggruppe	Terminus	Route	Terminus	Routing
S1	P Paula PI Panther PII Pastor	Oranienburg	Oranienburg – Lehnitz – Borgsdorf – Birkenwerder – Hohen Neuendorf – Frohnau – Hermsdorf – Waidmannslust – Wittenau (U8) – Wilhelmsruh – Schönholz – Wollankstraße – Bornholmer Straße – Gesundbrunnen (U8) – Humboldthain – Nordbahnhof – Oranienburger Straße – Friedrichstraße (U6) – Brandenburger Tor (U5) – Potsdamer Platz (U2) – Anhalter Bahnhof – Yorckstraße (Großgörschenstraße) (U7) – Julius-Leber-Brücke – Schöneberg – Friedenau – Feuerbachstraße – Rathaus Steglitz (U9) – Botanischer Garten – Lichterfelde West – Sundgauer Straße – Zehlendorf – Mexikoplatz – Schlachtensee – Nikolassee – Wannsee	Wannsee	Prussian Northern Railway, Berlin-Szczecin railway, Nord-Süd-Tunnel, Wannsee Railway
S15	Z Zeppelin ZI Zebra	Gesundbrunnen	Gesundbrunnen (U8) – Wedding (U6) – Hauptbahnhof (U5)	Hauptbahnhof	Berliner Ringbahn, S21
S2	W Wulff WI Wespe	Bernau	Bernau – Bernau-Friedenstal – Zepernick – Röntgental – Buch – Karow – Blankenburg – Pankow-Heinersdorf – Pankow (U2) – Bornholmer Straße – Gesundbrunnen (U8) – Humboldthain – Nordbahnhof – Oranienburger Straße – Friedrichstraße (U6) – Brandenburger Tor (U5) – Potsdamer Platz (U2) – Anhalter Bahnhof – Yorckstraße (U7) – Südkreuz – Priesterweg – Attilastraße – Marienfelde – Buckower Chaussee – Schichauweg – Lichtenrade – Mahlow – Blankenfelde	Blankenfelde	Berlin-Szczecin railway, Nord-Süd-Tunnel, Berlin-Dresden railway
S25	V Viktor	Hennigsdorf	Hennigsdorf – Heiligensee – Schulzendorf – Tegel – Eichborndamm – Karl-Bonhoeffer-Nervenklinik (U8) – Alt-Reinickendorf – Schönholz – Wollankstraße – Bornholmer Straße – Gesundbrunnen (U8) – Humboldthain – Nordbahnhof – Oranienburger Straße – Friedrichstraße (U6) – Brandenburger Tor (U5) – Potsdamer Platz (U2) – Anhalter Bahnhof – Yorckstraße (U7) – Südkreuz – Priesterweg – Südende – Lankwitz – Lichterfelde Ost – Osdorfer Straße – Lichterfelde Süd – Teltow Stadt	Teltow Stadt	Berlin-Lichterfelde Süd–Teltow Stadt railway, Anhalt Suburban Line, Nord-Süd-Tunnel, Berlin-Szczecin railway, Prussian Northern Railway, Kremmen Railway
S26	VI Vampir	Waidmannslust	Waidmannslust – Wittenau (U8) – Wilhelmsruh – Schönholz – Wollankstraße – Bornholmer Straße – Gesundbrunnen (U8) – Humboldthain – Nordbahnhof – Oranienburger Straße – Friedrichstraße (U6) – Brandenburger Tor (U5) – Potsdamer Platz (U2) – Anhalter Bahnhof – Yorckstraße (U7) – Südkreuz – Priesterweg – Südende – Lankwitz – Lichterfelde Ost – Osdorfer Straße – Lichterfelde Süd – Teltow Stadt	Teltow Stadt	Berlin-Lichterfelde Süd–Teltow Stadt railway, Anhalt Suburban Line, Nord-Süd-Tunnel, Berlin-Szczecin railway, Prussian Northern Railway, Kremmen Railway
S3	B Berta BI Bussard BII Benno (special service)	Spandau	Spandau (U7) – Stresow – Pichelsberg – Olympiastadion – Heerstraße – Messe Süd – Westkreuz – Charlottenburg (U7) – Savignyplatz – Zoologischer Garten (U2, U9) – Tiergarten – Bellevue – Hauptbahnhof (U5) – Friedrichstraße (U6) – Hackescher Markt – Alexanderplatz (U2, U5, U8) – Jannowitzbrücke (U8) – Ostbahnhof – Warschauer Straße (U1, U3) – Ostkreuz – Rummelsburg – Betriebsbahnhof Rummelsburg – Karlshorst – Wuhlheide – Köpenick – Hirschgarten – Friedrichshagen – Rahnsdorf – Wilhelmshagen – Erkner	Erkner	Berlin–Wrocław railway, Berlin Stadtbahn
S41	A Anton AI Adler	Südkreuz	Berlin Ringbahn	Südkreuz (clockwise)	Berlin Ringbahn
S42	R Richard RI Reiher	Südkreuz	Berlin Ringbahn	Südkreuz (counter-clockwise)	Berlin Ringbahn
S46	D Dora DI Delphin	Westend	Westend – Messe Nord/ICC – Westkreuz – Halensee – Hohenzollerndamm – Heidelberger Platz (U3) – Bundesplatz (U9) – Innsbrucker Platz (U4) – Schöneberg – Südkreuz – Tempelhof (U6) – Hermannstraße (U8) – Neukölln (U7) – Köllnische Heide – Baumschulenweg – Schöneweide – Johannisthal – Adlershof – Grünau – Eichwalde – Zeuthen – Wildau – Königs Wusterhausen	Königs Wusterhausen	Berlin-Görlitz railway, Baumschulenweg–Neukölln link line, Berliner Ringbahn
S47	K Konrad	Südkreuz	Südkreuz - Tempelhof (U6) - Hermannstraße (U8) – Neukölln (U7) – Köllnische Heide – Baumschulenweg – Schöneweide – Oberspree – Spindlersfeld	Spindlersfeld	Schöneweide–Spindlersfeld branch line, Berlin-Görlitz railway, Baumschulenweg–Neukölln link line, Berliner Ringbahn
S5	E Emil EI Elster EII Eiche EIII Erna (late night service) SII Sirius	Westkreuz	Westkreuz – Charlottenburg (U7) – Savignyplatz – Zoologischer Garten (U2, U9) – Tiergarten – Bellevue – Hauptbahnhof (U5) – Friedrichstraße (U6) – Hackescher Markt – Alexanderplatz (U2, U5, U8) – Jannowitzbrücke (U8) – Ostbahnhof – Warschauer Straße (U1, U3) – Ostkreuz – Nöldnerplatz – Lichtenberg (U5) – Friedrichsfelde Ost – Biesdorf – Wuhletal (U5) – Kaulsdorf – Mahlsdorf – Birkenstein – Hoppegarten – Neuenhagen – Fredersdorf – Petershagen Nord – Strausberg – Hegermühle – Strausberg Stadt – Strausberg Nord	Strausberg Nord	Strausberg–Strausberg Nord railway, Prussian Eastern Railway, Berlin Stadtbahn, Spandau Suburban Line
S7	O Otto OI Olaf	Potsdam Hauptbahnhof	Potsdam Hauptbahnhof – Babelsberg – Griebnitzsee – Wannsee – Nikolassee – Grunewald – Westkreuz – Charlottenburg (U7) – Savignyplatz – Zoologischer Garten (U2, U9) – Tiergarten – Bellevue – Hauptbahnhof (U5) – Friedrichstraße (U6) – Hackescher Markt – Alexanderplatz (U2, U5, U8) – Jannowitzbrücke (U8) – Ostbahnhof – Warschauer Straße (U1, U3) – Ostkreuz – Nöldnerplatz – Lichtenberg (U5) – Friedrichsfelde Ost – Springpfuhl – Poelchaustraße – Marzahn – Raoul-Wallenberg-Straße – Mehrower Allee – Ahrensfelde	Ahrensfelde	Wriezen Railway, Berlin Outer Ring, Prussian Eastern Railway, Berlin Stadtbahn, Berlin-Blankenheim railway, Berlin-Magdeburg railway
S75	T Theodor TI Tapir	Warschauer Straße	Warschauer Straße (U1, U3) – Ostkreuz – Nöldnerplatz – Lichtenberg (U5) – Friedrichsfelde Ost – Springpfuhl – Gehrenseestraße – Hohenschönhausen – Wartenberg	Wartenberg	Berlin Outer Ring, Prussian Eastern Railway
S8	N Nordpol	Birkenwerder	Birkenwerder – Hohen Neuendorf – Bergfelde – Schönfließ – Mühlenbeck-Mönchmühle – Blankenburg – Pankow-Heinersdorf – Pankow (U2) – Bornholmer Straße – Schönhauser Allee (U2) – Prenzlauer Allee – Greifswalder Straße – Landsberger Allee – Storkower Straße – Frankfurter Allee (U5) – Ostkreuz – Treptower Park – Plänterwald – Baumschulenweg – Schöneweide – Johannisthal – Adlershof – Grünau (– Eichwalde – Zeuthen – Wildau)	Grünau (↔ Wildau)	Berlin-Görlitz railway, Berliner Ringbahn, Berlin-Szczecin railway, Berlin Outer Ring, Prussian Northern Railway
S85	M Möwe	Frohnau (↔ Pankow)	Frohnau – Hermsdorf – Waidmannslust – Wittenau (U8) – Wilhelmsruh – Schönholz – Wollankstraße – (Berlin-Pankow (U2) –) Bornholmer Straße – Schönhauser Allee (U2) – Prenzlauer Allee – Greifswalder Straße – Landsberger Allee – Storkower Straße – Frankfurter Allee (U5) – Ostkreuz – Treptower Park – Plänterwald – Baumschulenweg – Schöneweide – Johannisthal – Adlershof – Altglienicke – Grünbergallee – Schönefeld (bei Berlin) – Waßmannsdorf – Flughafen BER – Terminal 1–2	✈ Flughafen BER – Terminal 1–2	Berlin-Görlitz railway, Berliner Ringbahn, Berlin-Görlitz railway, Grünauer Kreuz–Berlin Brandenburg Airport railway
S9	C Cäsar	Spandau	Spandau (U7) – Stresow – Pichelsberg – Olympiastadion – Heerstraße – Messe Süd – Westkreuz – Charlottenburg (U7) – Savignyplatz – Zoologischer Garten (U2, U9) – Tiergarten – Bellevue – Hauptbahnhof (U5) – Friedrichstraße (U6) – Hackescher Markt – Alexanderplatz (U2, U5, U8) – Jannowitzbrücke (U8) – Ostbahnhof – Warschauer Straße (U1, U3) – Ostkreuz – Treptower Park – Plänterwald – Baumschulenweg – Schöneweide – Johannisthal – Adlershof – Altglienicke – Grünbergallee – Schönefeld (bei Berlin) – Waßmannsdorf – Flughafen BER – Terminal 1–2	✈ Flughafen BER – Terminal 1–2	Berlin Stadtbahn, Berliner Ringbahn, Berlin-Görlitz railway, Grünauer Kreuz–Berlin Brandenburg Airport railway

Stations in brackets are serviced at certain times only (Monday through Friday during offpeak in the case of S45 and during peak in the case of S8 and S85). S85 only runs Monday through Friday.

=== Service hours ===
The S-Bahn generally operates between 4am and 1am Monday to Friday, between 5am and 1am on Saturdays and between 6:30am and 1am on Sundays during normal daytime service. However, there is a comprehensive night-time service on most lines between 1am and 5am on Saturdays and 01:00 and 06:30 on Sundays, which means that most stations enjoy a continuous service between Friday morning and Sunday evening. One exception to this is the section of the S8 between Blankenburg and Hohen Neuendorf which sees no service in these hours. Most other lines operate without route changes, but some are curtailed or extended during nighttime. Particularly, the S1, S2, S25, S3, S41, S42, S5, S7 are unchanged, and the S45 and S85 have no nighttime service. Westbound lines S46, S47, S75, and northbound S9 terminate at stations Südkreuz, Schöneweide, Lichtenberg, and Treptower Park, respectively.

=== Depots ===
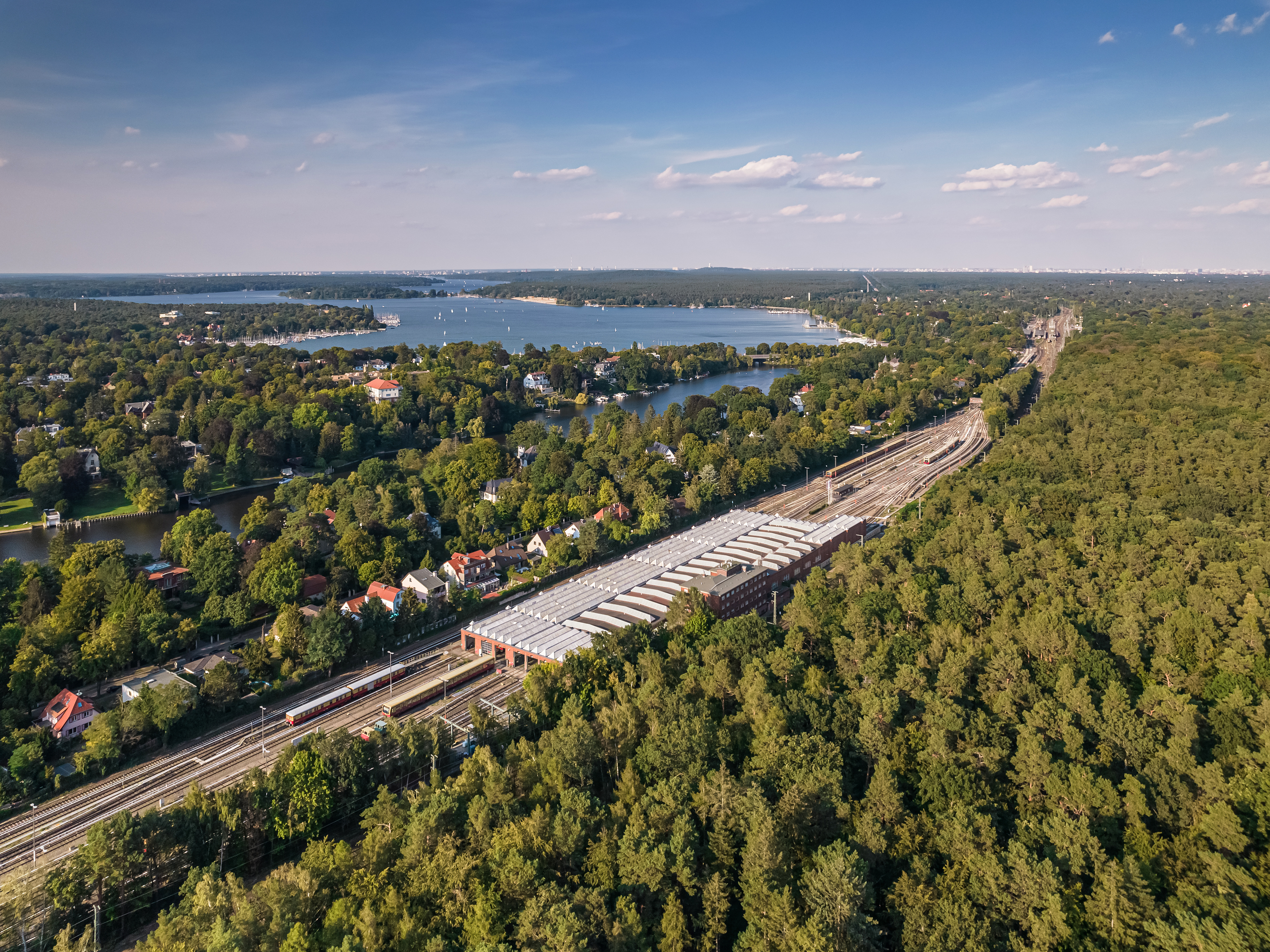
Depot at Wannsee, 2022

There were several depots for Berlin S-Bahn. They are Schöneweide (opened in December 1927), Friedrichsfelde (opened on 1 March 1903), Grünau (opened on 1 April 1910), Wannsee (opened on 15 May 1933), Erkner (opened in 1928) and Oranienburg (opened in 1925).

At Grünau, construction began in 1916 and was completed in 1928. It serviced the following routes:

- Grünau – Südring – Stadtbahn – Lichtenberg
- Grünau – Stadtbahn – Spandau West
- Grünau – Nordring – Gartenfeld (nur HVZ)

The connection to Spandau West became in the following years the traditional train course, which was maintained after 1945 until the building of the Berlin Wall. In the 1980s, the depot made 51 daily trains for the connections using Class 485 trains.

- Zeuthen – Ostring – Bernau
- Königs Wusterhausen – Stadtbahn – Friedrichstraße – Stadtbahn – Erkner – Stadtbahn – Friedrichstraße
- Flughafen Berlin-Schönefeld – Stadtbahn – Friedrichstraße
- Spindlersfeld – Ostring – Blankenburg

Closed depots include:

- Stettiner Bahnhof
- Papestraße
- Westend
- Bernau
- Hundekehle
- Velten
- Yorckstraße

== History ==
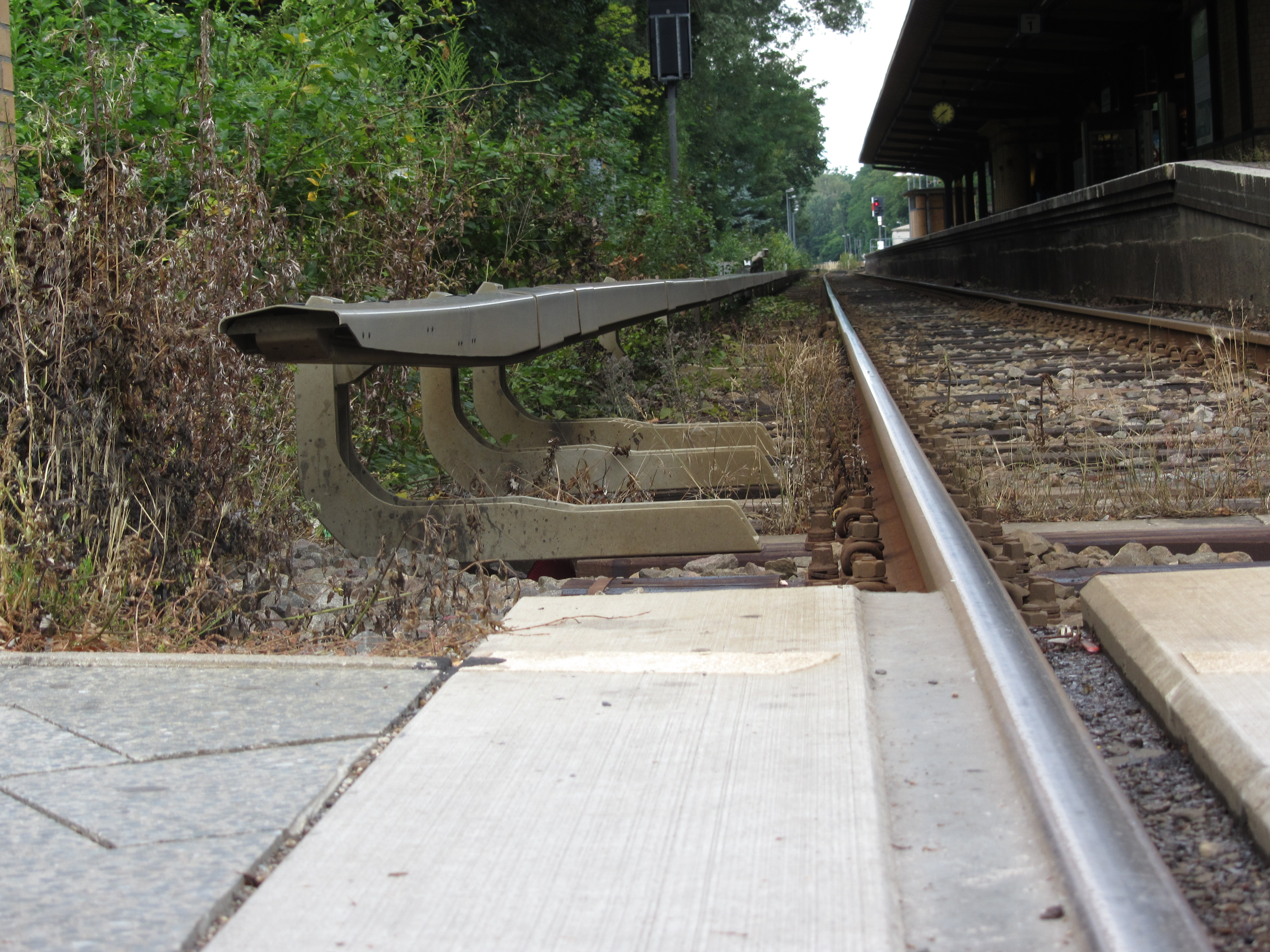
Berlin S-Bahn was converted from steam to third rail electrification starting in the late 1920s. The rail is bottom-contact. Seen here at the level crossing at Lichtenrade station

=== From the beginning until the end of World War II ===
With individual sections dating from the 1870s, the S-Bahn was formed in time as the network of suburban commuter railways running into Berlin, then interconnected by the circular railway connecting the various terminal railway stations, and in 1882 enhanced by the east–west cross-city line (called the Stadtbahn, 'city railway'). The forming of a distinct identity for this network began with the establishment of a special tariff for the area which was then called the Berliner Stadt-, Ring- und Vorortbahnen, and which differed from the normal railway tariff. While the regular railway tariff was based on multiplying the distance covered with a fixed price per kilometre, the special tariff for this Berlin tariff zone was based on a graduated tariff based on the number of stations touched during the travel.

The core of this network, that is the cross-city (Stadtbahn) east–west line and the circular Ringbahn, and several suburban branches were converted from steam operation to a third-rail electric railway in the latter half of the 1920s. The Wannsee railway, the suburban line with the highest number of passengers, was electrified in 1932–33. A number of suburban trains remained steam-hauled, even after the Second World War.

After building the east–west cross-city line connecting western suburban lines, which until then terminated at Charlottenburg station with eastern suburban lines which had terminated at Frankfurter Bahnhof (later Schlesischer Bahnhof), the logical next step was a north–south cross-city line connecting the northern suburban lines terminating at Stettiner Bahnhof with the southern suburban lines terminating at the subsidiary stations of the Berlin Potsdamer Bahnhof. The first ideas for this project emerged only 10 years after the completion of the east–west cross-city line, with several concrete proposals resulting from a 1909 competition held by the Berlin city administration. Another concrete proposal, already very close to the final realisation, was put forward in 1926 by Professor Jenicke of Breslau university.

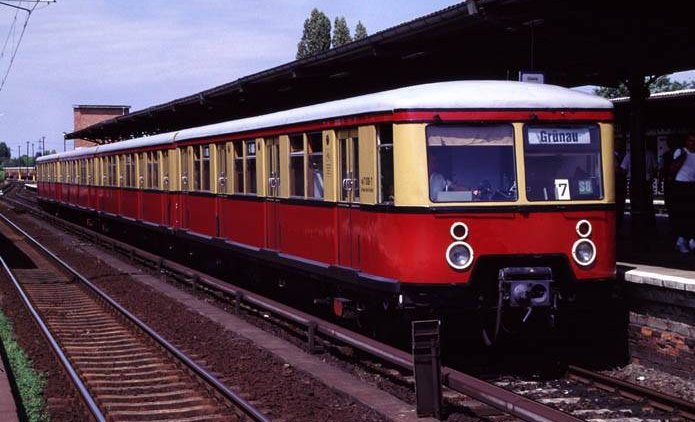
Some Type 477 trains, built before World War II, remained in service until the early 21st century.

Many sections of the S-Bahn were closed during the war, both through enemy action and flooding of the Nord–Süd-Bahn tunnel on 2 May 1945 during the final Battle of Berlin. The exact number of casualties is not known, but up to 200 people are presumed to have perished, since the tunnel was used as a public shelter and also served to house military wounded in trains on underground sidings. Service through the tunnel commenced again in 1947.

=== The time of expansion ===
==== Before the construction of Berlin Wall ====
After hostilities ceased in 1945, Berlin was given special status as a "Four-Sector City", surrounded by the Soviet Occupation Zone, which later became the German Democratic Republic (GDR). The Allies had decided that S-Bahn service in the western sectors of Berlin should continue to be provided by the Reichsbahn (DR), which was by now the provider of railway services in East Germany. (Rail services in West Germany proper were provided by the new Deutsche Bundesbahn.)

Before the construction of the Berlin Wall in 1961, the Berlin S-Bahn had grown to about 335 kilometres (208 mi). On the 13 August 1961, it was the biggest turning point in the operation and network for the S-Bahn.

As relations between East and West began to sour with the coming of the Cold War, the S-Bahn had become the victim of the hostilities. Although services continued operating through all occupation sectors, checkpoints were constructed on the borders with East Berlin and on-board "customs checks" were carried out on trains. From 1958 onward, some S-Bahn trains ran non-stop through the western sectors from stations in East Berlin to stations on outlying sections in East Germany so as to avoid the need for such controls. East German government employees were then forbidden to use the S-Bahn since it travelled through West Berlin.

==== After the construction of Berlin Wall ====
The S-Bahn has also been operated in two separate subnets of the Deutsche Reichsbahn. In East Berlin, the S-Bahn retained a transport share of approximately 35 percent, the mode of transport with the highest passenger share. In the 1970s and 1980s the route network continued to grow. In particular, the new housing estates were connected to the grid in the northeast of the city (Marzahn and Hohenschönhausen).

The construction of the Berlin Wall led to West Berlin calling for the unions and politicians to boycott the S-Bahn. Subsequently, passenger numbers fell.

However, the Berlin S-Bahn strike brought the S-Bahn to the attention of the public, and aroused the desire for West Berlin to manage its section of the S-Bahn itself. In 1983 negotiations of representatives of the Senate, the SNB and the Deutsche Reichsbahn took place. In December 1983, these were concluded with Allied consent to the agreement between the Deutsche Reichsbahn and the Berlin Senate for the transfer of operating rights of the S-Bahn in the area of West Berlin. The BVG received the oldest carriages from the DR; but the BVG was eager to quickly get to modern standards for a subway. Therefore, soon new S-Bahn trains were purchased on their behalf, which are still in use on the Berlin S-Bahn network as the 480 series.

Even before the Wall fell, there were efforts to substantial re-commissioning of the S-Bahn network in West Berlin.

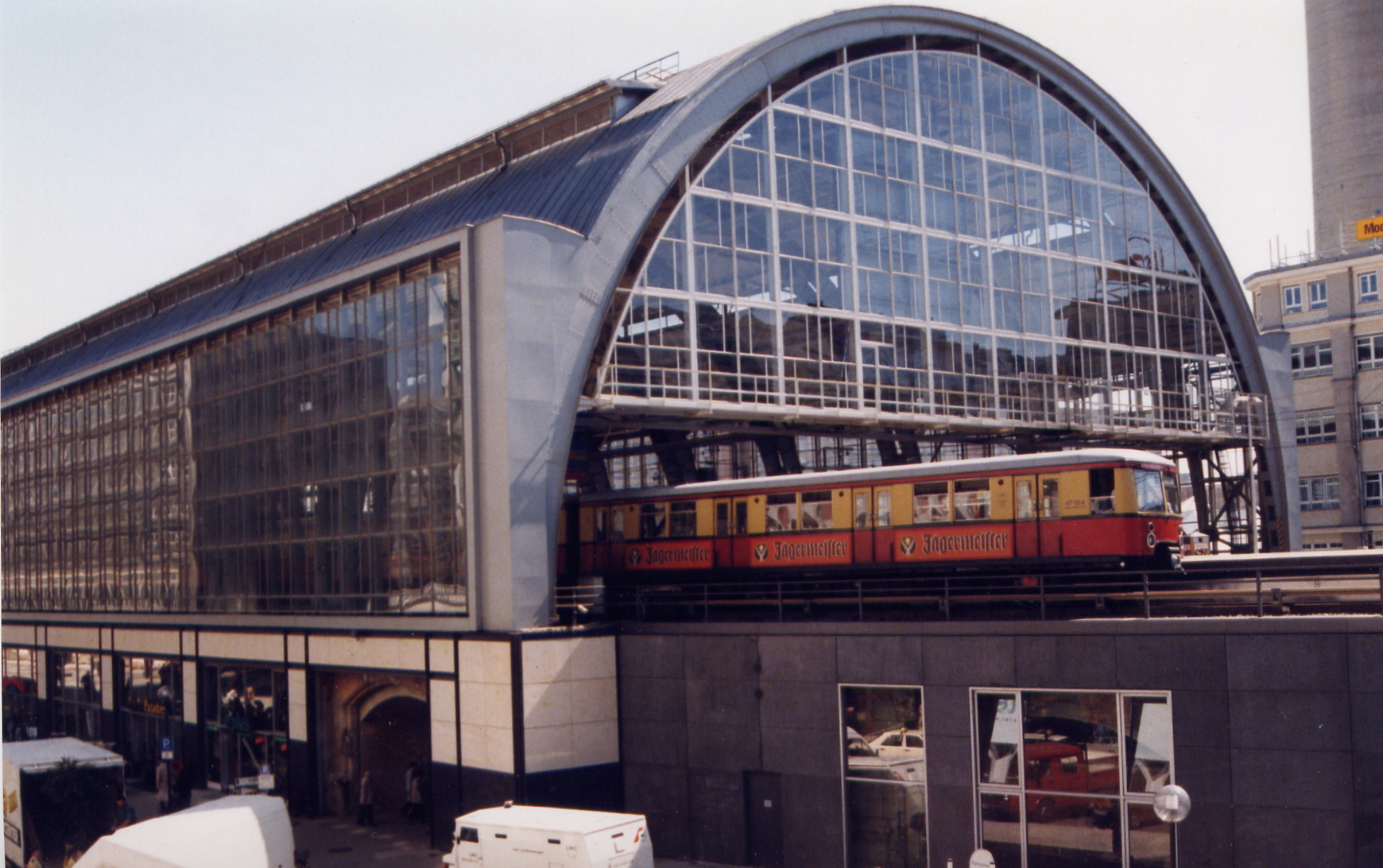
Alexanderplatz, an important transport hub in eastern Berlin, 1999

=== Reunification ===
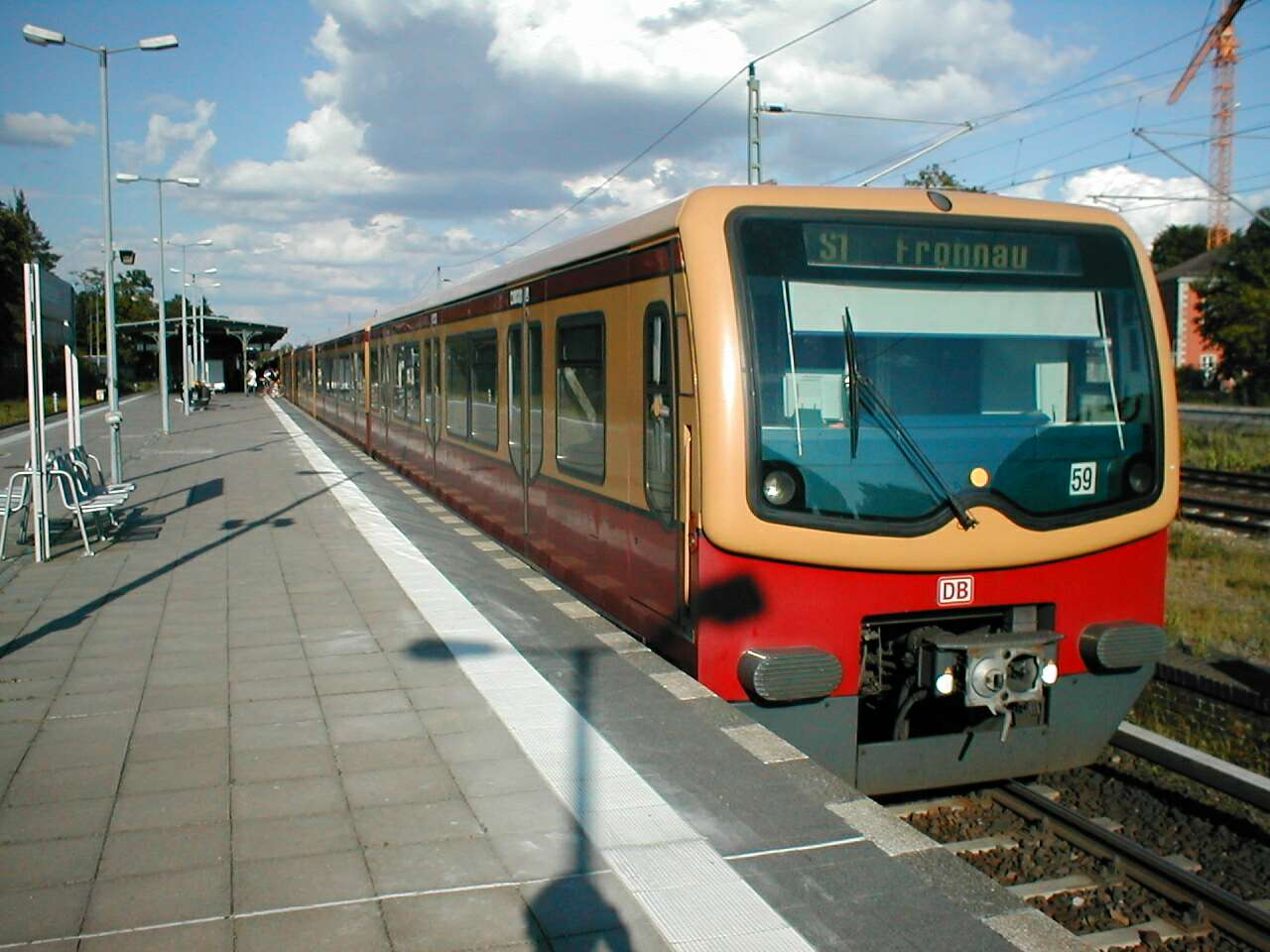
A modern S-Bahn train at Griebnitzsee, 2004

After the Berlin Wall came down in November 1989, the first broken links were re-established, with Friedrichstraße on 1 July 1990 as the first. The BVG and DR jointly marketed the services soon after the reunification. Administratively, the divided S-Bahn networks remained separate in this time of momentous changes, encompassing German reunification and reunification of Berlin into a single city, although the dividing line was no longer the former Berlin Wall. DR and BVG (of the whole of reunified Berlin from 1 January 1992, after absorbing BVB of East Berlin) operated individual lines end to end, both into the other party's territories. For example, S2 was all BVG even after it was extended northward and southward into Brandenburg/former East German territory. The main east–west route (Stadtbahn) was a joint operation. Individual trains were operated by either BVG or DR end-to-end on the same tracks. This arrangement ended on 1 January 1994, with the creation of Deutsche Bahn due to the merger between DR and the former West Germany's Deutsche Bundesbahn. All S-Bahn operations in Berlin were transferred to the newly formed S-Bahn Berlin GmbH as a subsidiary of Deutsche Bahn, and the BVG withdrew from running S-Bahn services.

Technically, a number of projects followed in the steps of re-establishing broken links in order to restore the former S-Bahn network to its 1961 status after 1990, especially the Ringbahn. In December 1997 the connection between Neukölln and Treptower Park via Sonnenallee was reopened, enabling S4 trains to run 75% of the whole ring between Schönhauser Allee and Jungfernheide. On 16 June 2002, the section Gesundbrunnen – Westhafen also reopened, re-establishing the Ringbahn operations.

=== After reunification ===
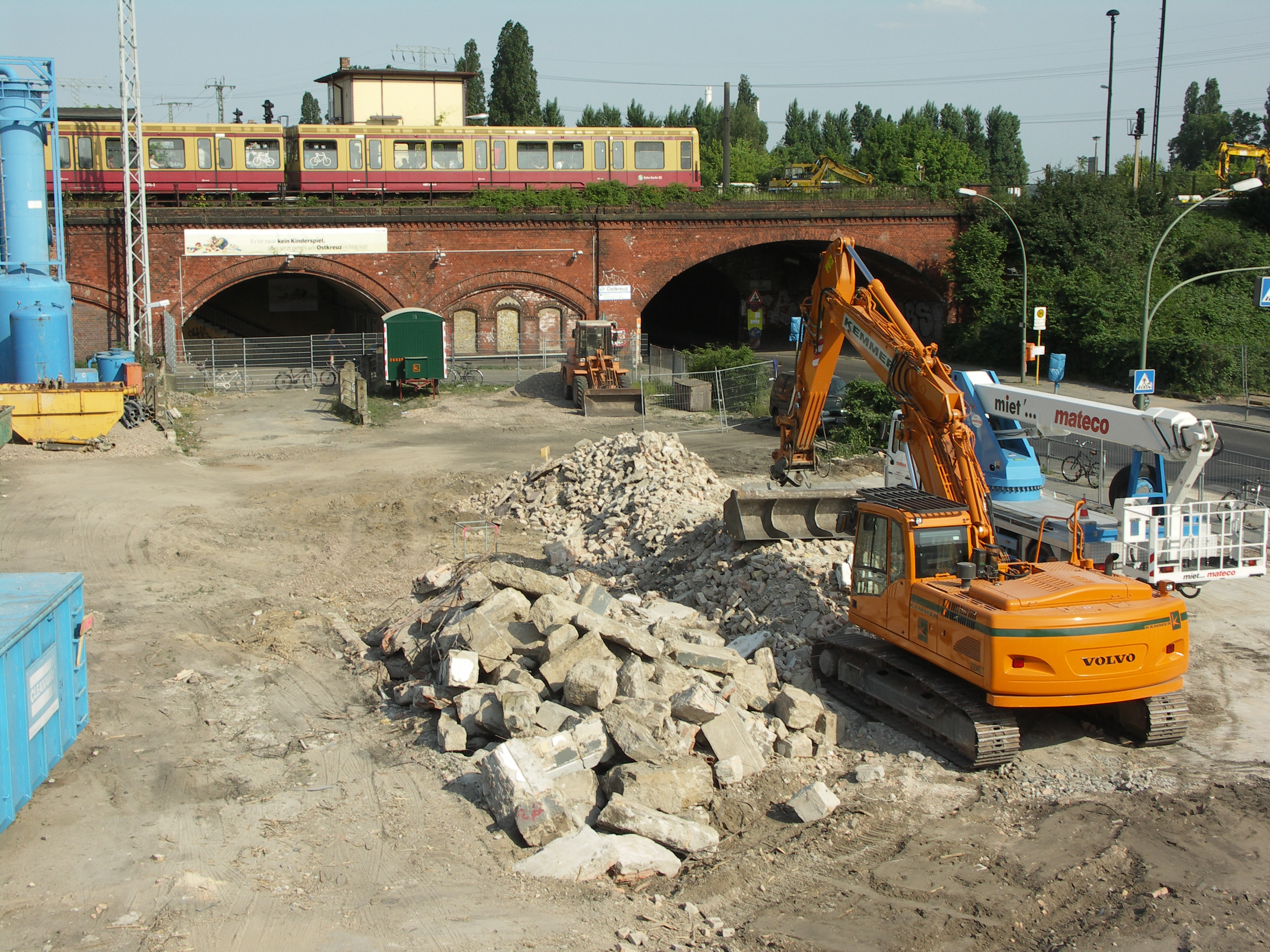
Demolition of the Ostkreuz southern curve in 2008

In 1988, Deutsche Reichsbahn presented plans for the transformation of Ostkreuz station. The long postponed renovation of the station began in 2007. With nine lines (four on the Stadtbahn and five on the Ringbahn), Ostkreuz is one of the busiest stations on the network. In October 2009, the new Regionalbahn station on the Ringbahn was sufficiently complete for S-Bahn trains on the Ringbahn to use it temporarily. Demolition of the Ringbahn platform could then start and the new platform, including a concourse, could be built. This was put into operation on 16 April 2012, after a 16-day track closure. In December 2018 all the S-Bahn tracks at Ostkreuz finished construction and were opened for regular passenger use.

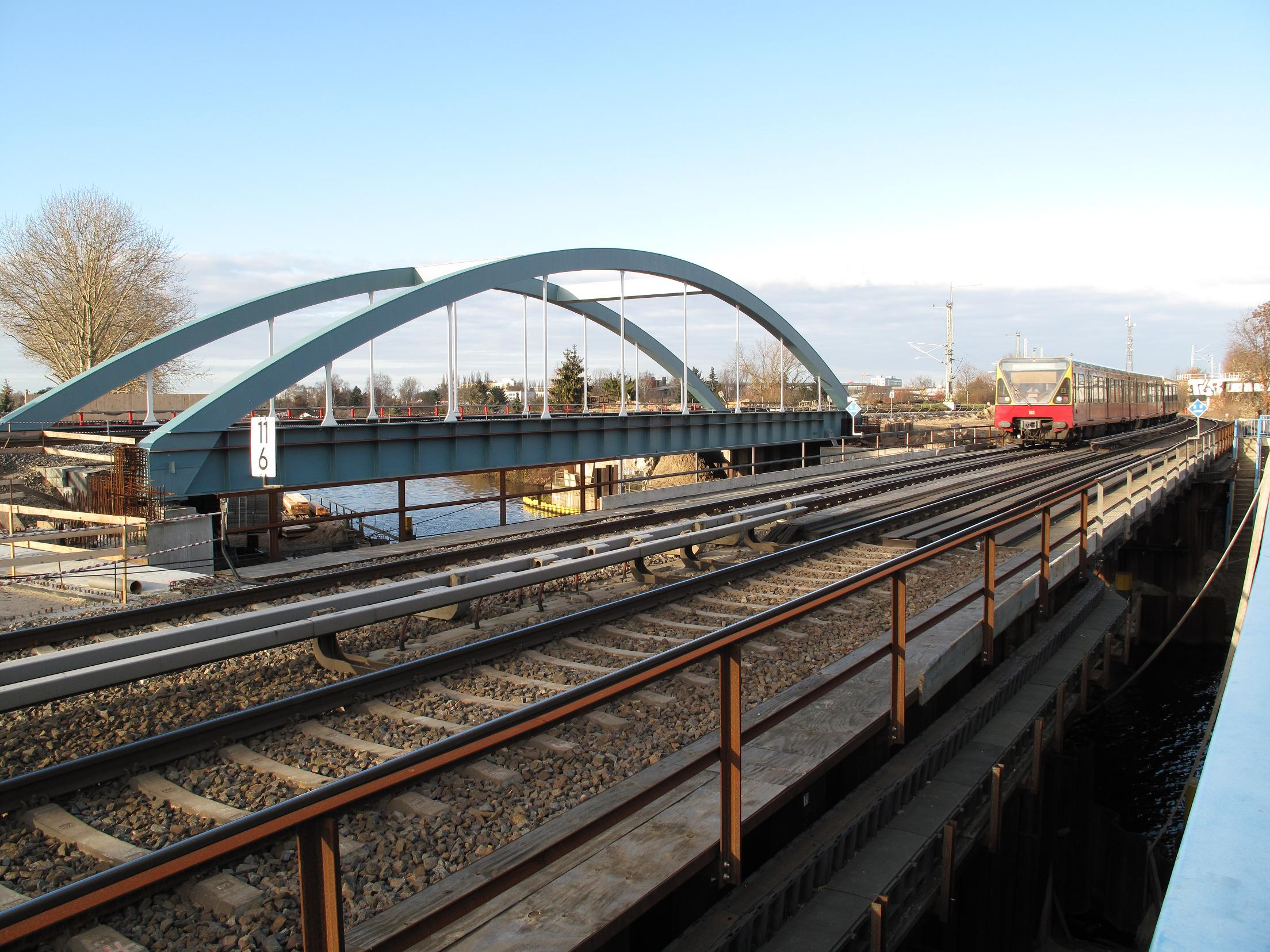
Renewal of the Görlitz Railway bridge over the Teltow Canal, November 2009

Rehabilitation work at Grünauer Kreuz on the Berlin–Görlitz railway began on 12 July 2006. In 2010 and 2011, rebuilt stations were put into operation in several stages at Baumschulenweg and Adlershof and the bridges over the Britz Canal and the Teltow Canal were replaced. During the reconstruction, the platform at Adlershof was relocated directly above Rudower Chaussee (street).

Other major construction projects are planned along the route:

- Rebuilding of Schöneweide station, including the construction of a new road underpass
- Replacement of bridges over Sterndamm (street)
- Construction of additional electronic interlocking equipment along the route
- Conversion of Wildau station
- Renewal of the mainline tracks and the re-establishment of the overhead contact line system

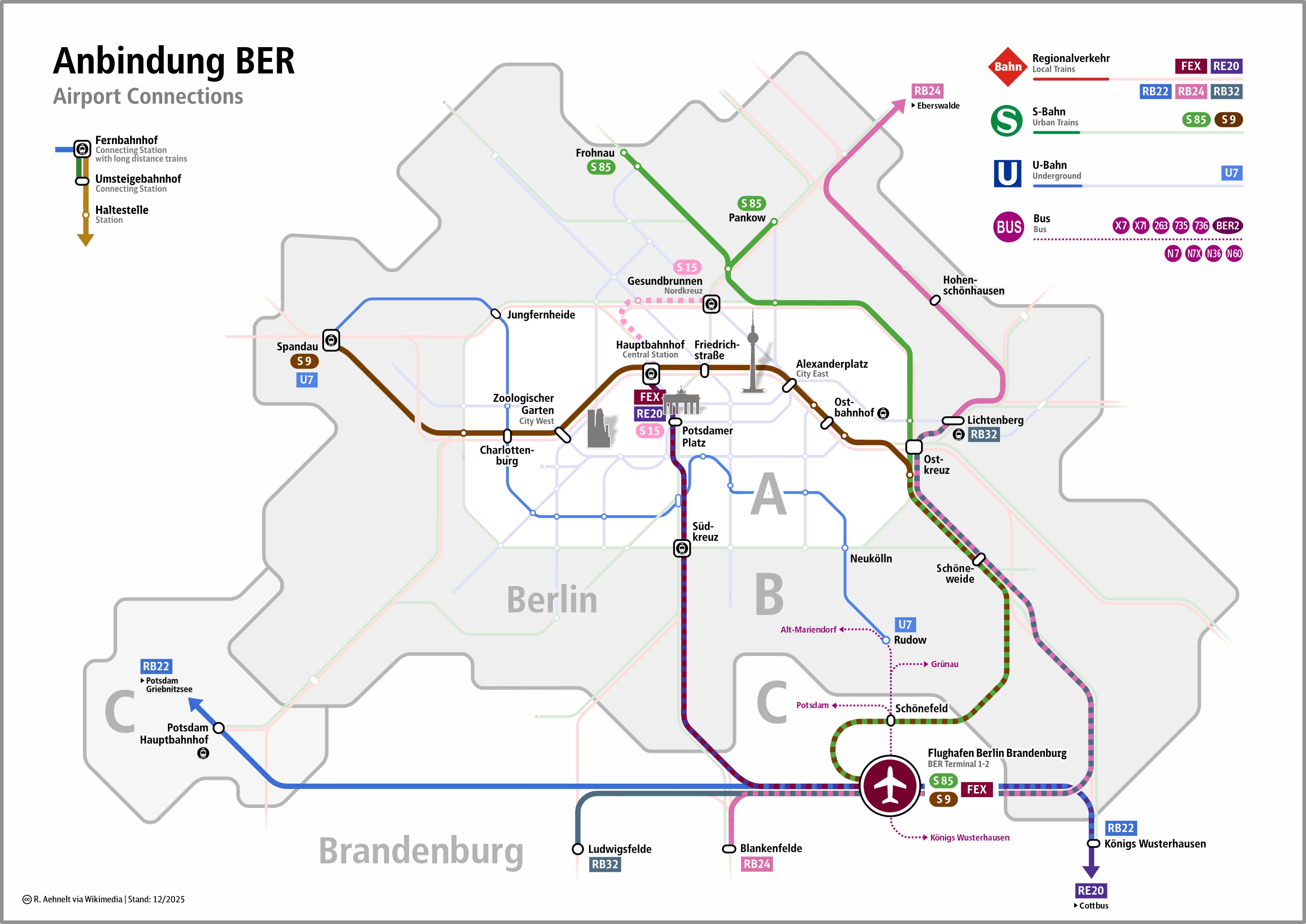
Connections to Berlin-Brandenburg Airport at the point of opening

In preparation for the opening of Berlin-Brandenburg Airport in Schönefeld in the south of Berlin, S-Bahn lines S45 and S9 were set to be extended from the then terminus at Berlin-Schoenefeld Airport in a long curve to the new terminal. Directly below the terminal, Berlin Brandenburg, a station has been built with six platform tracks. Four through platform tracks are provided for long-distance services. Two tracks are operated by S-Bahn services on the approach from the west. In early July 2008, the first 185-metre-long section of the station was completed so that the terminal could be built. On 24 July 2009, the airport company transferred the completed shell of the airport railway station and the first part of the tunnel to DB. The new line includes the stations of Waßmannsdorf and Berlin Brandenburg Airport and has a length of approximately 7.8 kilometres. The construction cost was specified as €636 million. This amount also included the cost of construction of long-distance tracks.

In 2020 the Berlin Brandenburg Airport was opened with a 9-year delay. With the opening of the airport, the S-Bahn service also began operation, which meant that the lines S45 and S9 were extended as was planned more than 10 years ago.

== Rolling stock ==
=== Current ===
- BVG Class 480 (since 1986, in use on line S3)
- DB Class 481/482 (since 1996, in use on lines S1, S2, S25, S26, S3, S41, S42, S5, S7, S75, S85 and S9)
- Class 483/484 (since 2021, in use on line S41, S42, S46, S47 and S8)
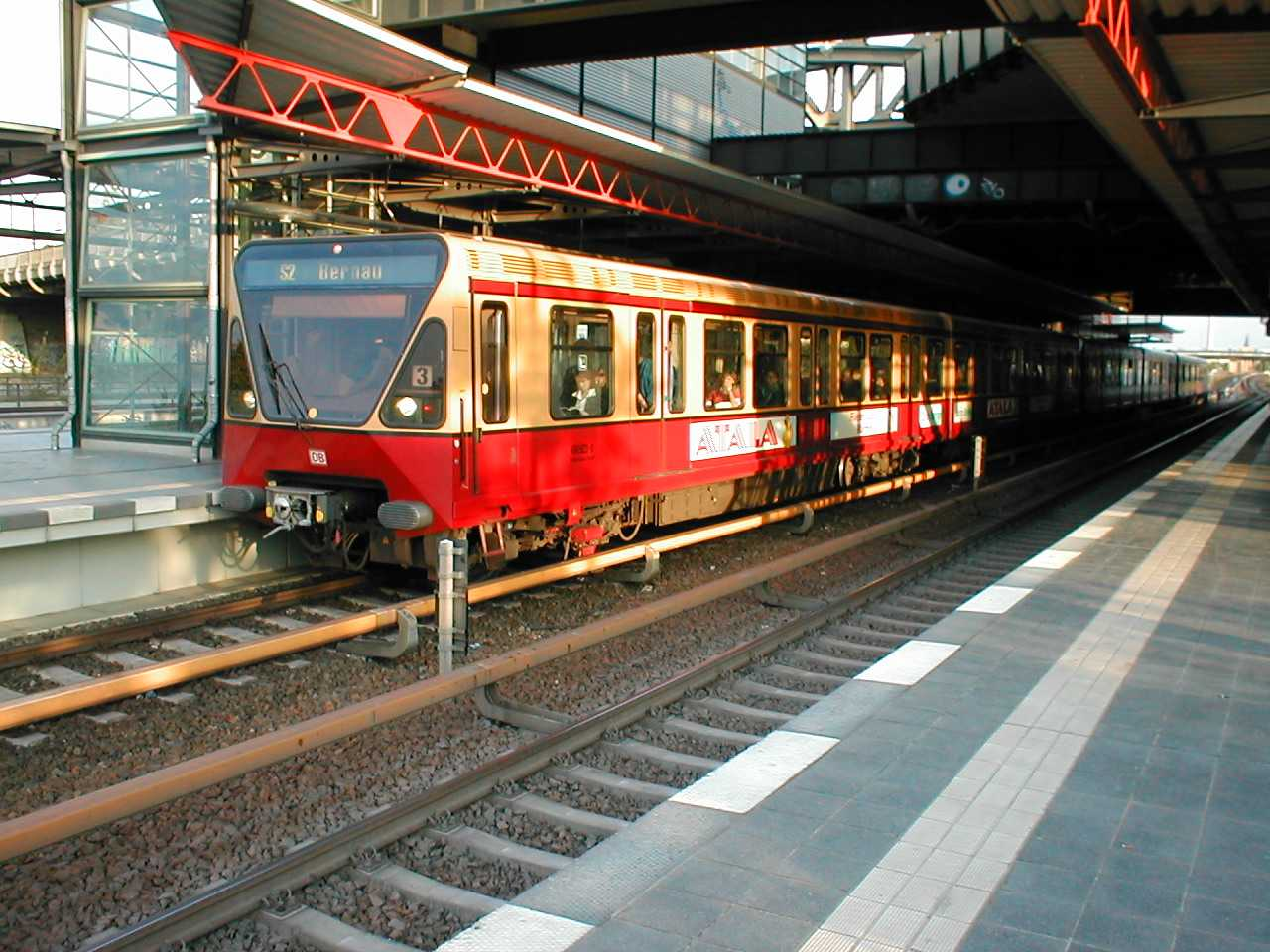
Class 480

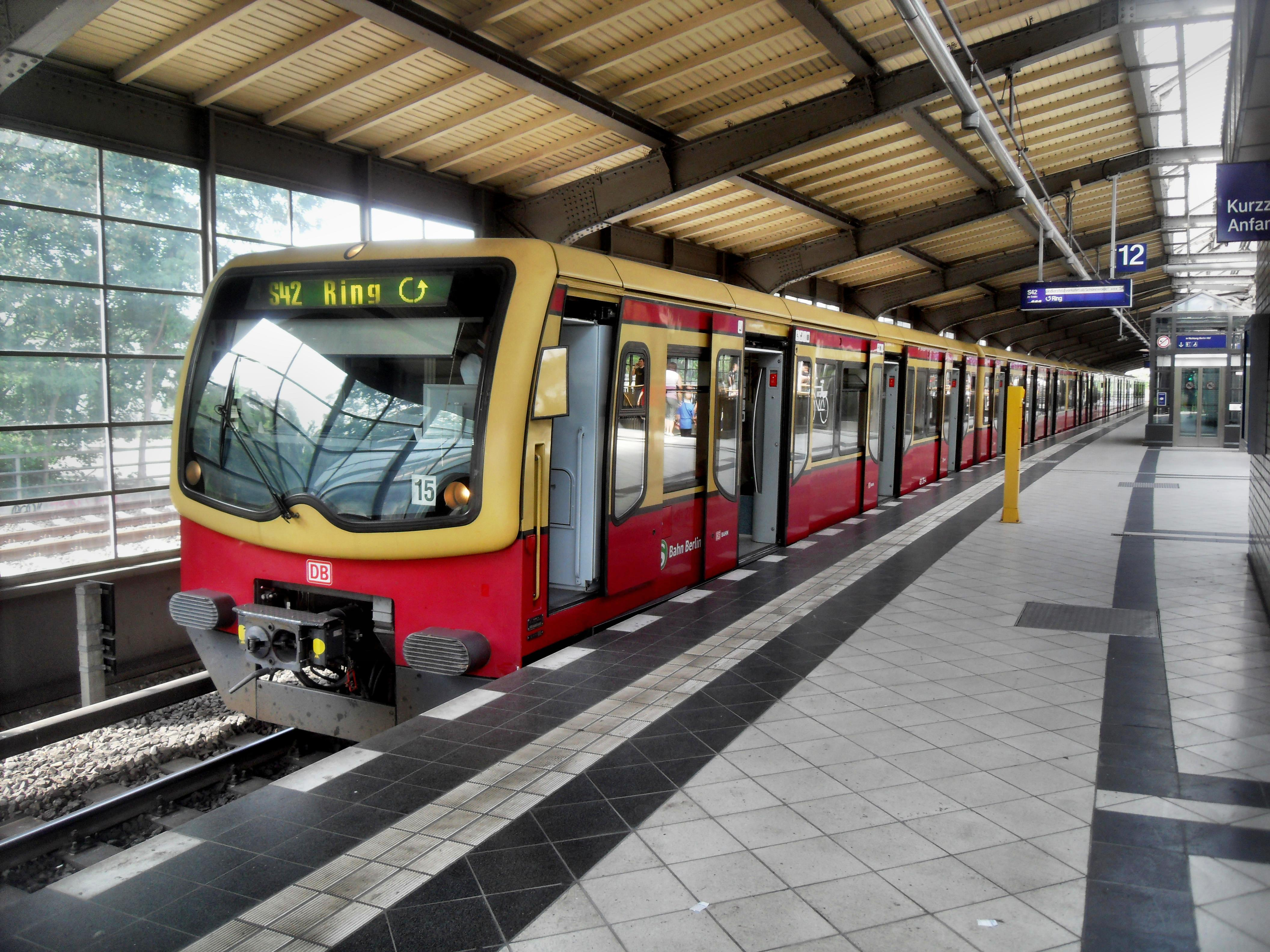
Class 481

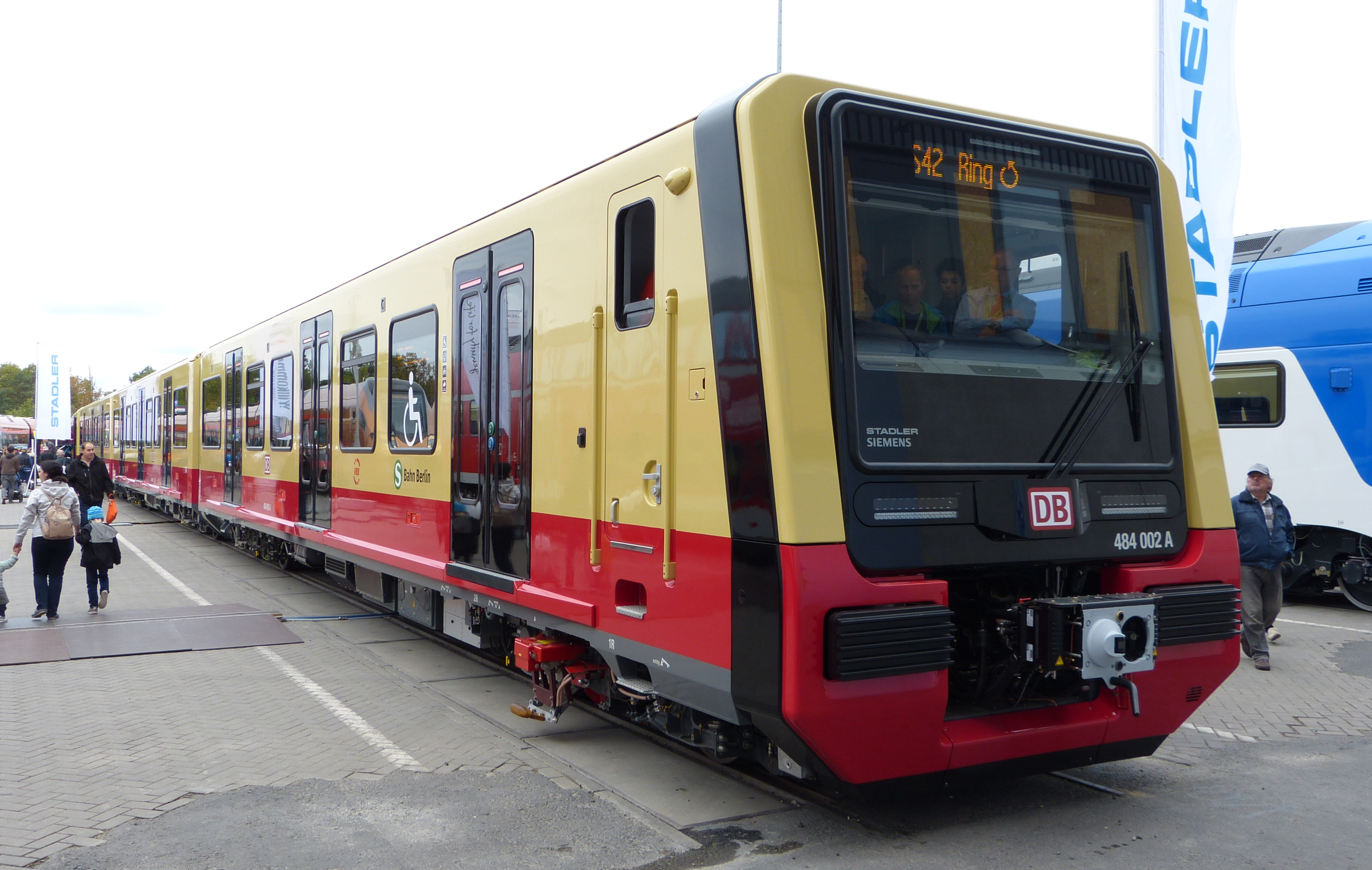
Class 483

=== Former ===
- DRG Class ET 125 (from 1935 until 2003)
- DRG Class ET 165 (from 1928 until 1997)
- DRG Class ET 166 (from 1936 until 2000)
- DRG Class ET 167 (from 1938 until 2003)
- DRG Class ET 168 (from 1926 until about 1962, some units converted to train type EIII for the Berlin U-Bahn)
- DRG Class ET 169 (from 1925 until 1962)
- DR Class ET 170 (from 1959 until 1970)
- DR Class 485/885 (from 1987 until 2023)
DR Class ET 165

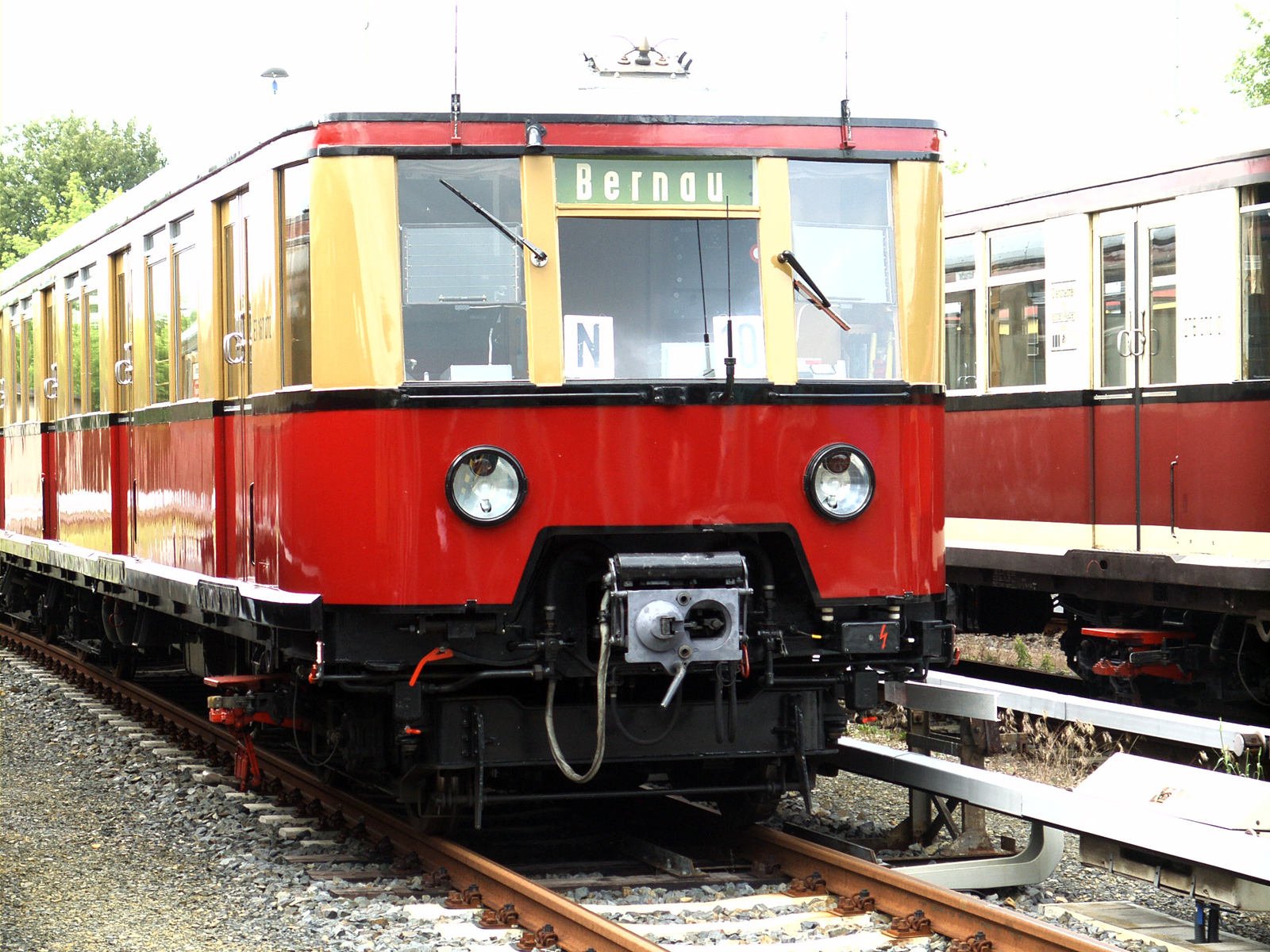
DR Class ET 167

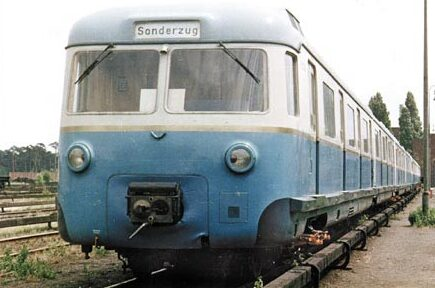
DR Class ET 170

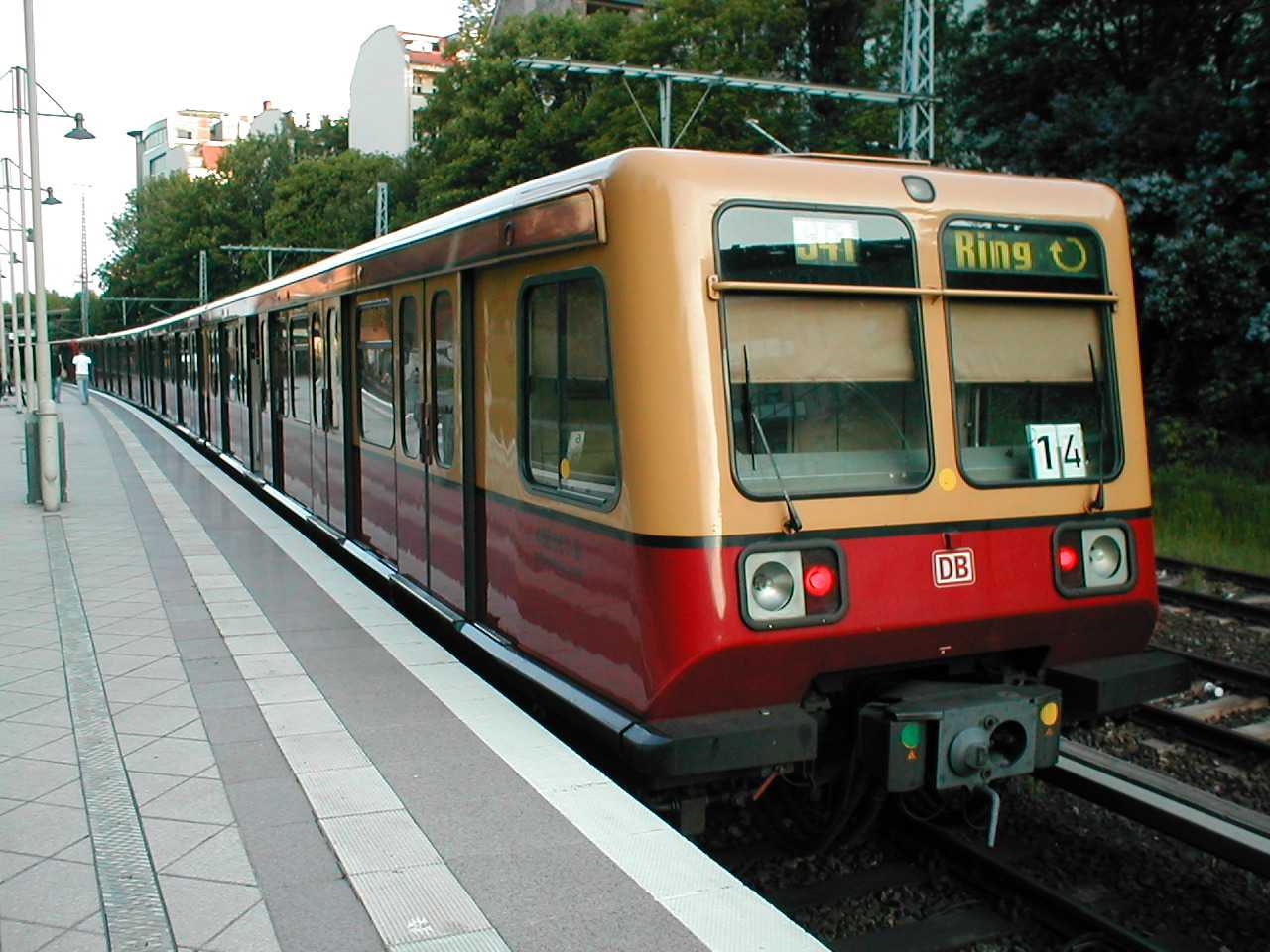
Class 485

=== Special Trains ===
This vehicle, DB Class 488.0 (Panorama train) is a unique piece. The train consists of two railcars and a sidecar in between. It was created by conversion from old cars of the ET / EB 167, the later series 477/877. While the car body is largely a new build, many technical components of end-of-life vehicles were taken over in 1997–99. This train is not used in normal regular service. The S-Bahn offered city tours with it until 2009, and it could be rented privately. The train is equipped with a modern multimedia system so that the announcements via headphones can be followed in multiple languages. As with this car the windows extend into the roof for a better field of vision, it is called a panorama train (previously known as a panoramic suburban train).

Otherwise museum and tradition trains were primarily used – Class 165. The Viertel train Class ET/EB 167s were being built in 1938 and was converted in 1991.

== Expansion ==
=== Planning of line S21 (Second Nord–Süd Bahn: first stage) ===
Proposed Line S21
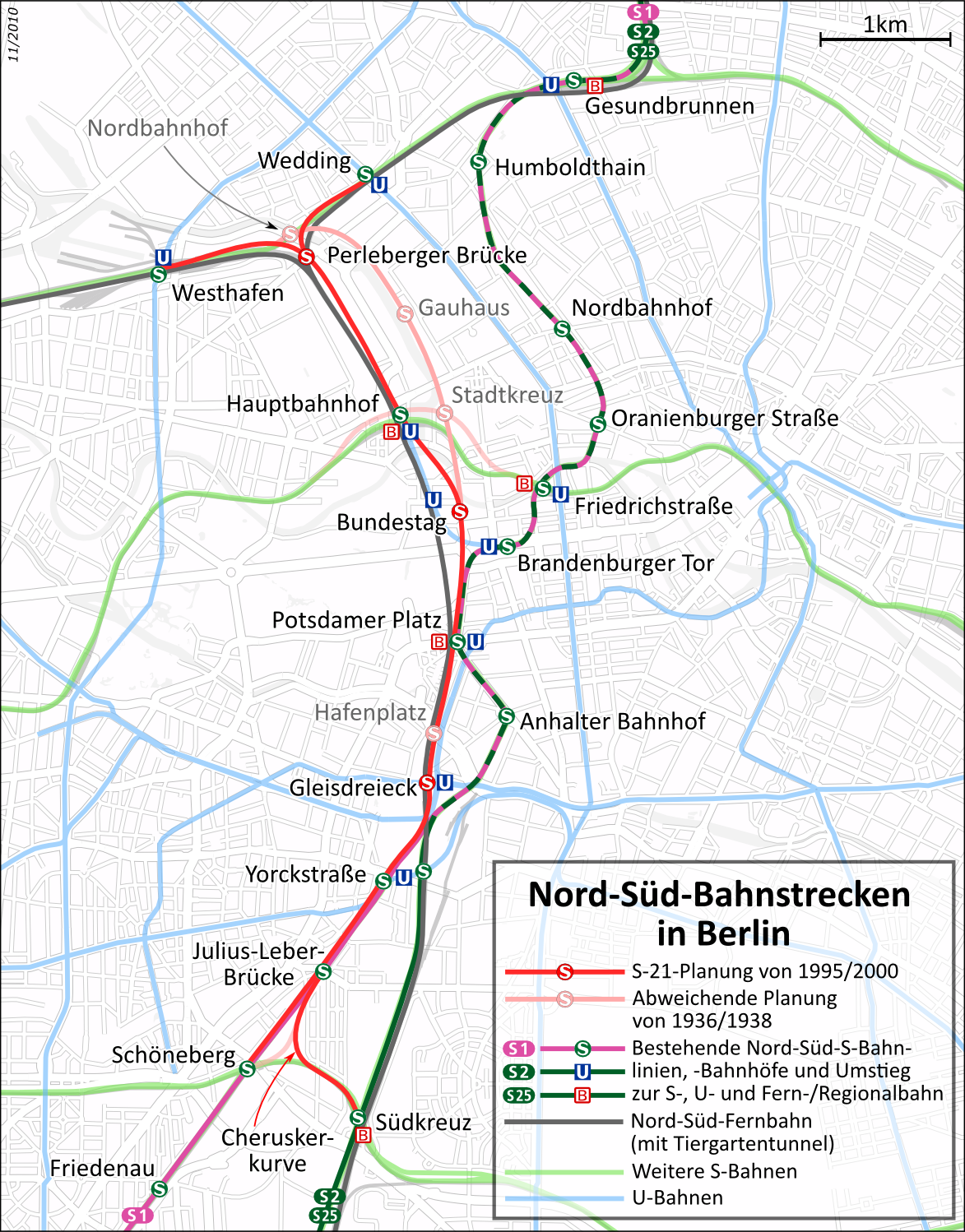

Overview
- Line number: 6017 Westhafen–Hbf–Potsdamer Platz; 6019 Wedding–Hauptbahnhof
- Locale: Berlin

Technical
- Track gauge: 1,435 mm (4 ft 8 1/2 in) standard gauge
- Electrification: 750 V third rail (under-running)

The second Nord–Süd Bahn will link the northern ring to the Hauptbahnhof, Potsdamer Platz station and the Wannsee Railway to the southern ring. Today's plans are almost identical to plans submitted to the 1907–1910 Greater Berlin competition by Albert Sprickerhof. Since then, there have been a number of alternatives proposals for such a route. A similar line was included in the plans for Welthauptstadt Germania ('World Capital Germania') in the 1930s.

The line will be built in sections. In 2005, the zoning approval for the northern part of the route from the Ringbahn to Hauptbahnhof was adopted. In October 2009 a loan agreement was entered into between the Senate and Deutsche Bahn for the first section. This provided for total costs of €226.5 million. On 27 November 2009, the preparatory work for this phase of construction started at the Hauptbahnhof. For the underground excavation in Invalidenstrasse, diaphragm walls were built into the ground and the trench in between was covered with a reinforced concrete lid.

This stage involves the construction of a curve to the Westhafen and an eastern connection to Wedding inside the northern Ringbahn. Structural preparation for these junctions to these lines had already been made during the construction of the North–South mainline in 2006. From there, the existing line will run in a southerly direction (in the tunnel layer) to the Berlin Hauptbahnhof east of the North–South mainline. The realization of an intermediate station under the working name of Perleberger Brücke (as a two-level station in a V-shape) is provided as an option. It was proposed to complete this 1,600-meter-long section by 2016. After construction delays caused by the inflow of groundwater, the COVID-19 pandemic, and the global supply chain crisis, the opening is planned for 2024 at the earliest.

=== Planning of line S21 (Second Nord–Süd Bahn: second stage) ===
The construction of the second section of the S21 is to begin no earlier than 2018 and is expected to be completed in 2023. The new S-Bahn line will run in a tunnel from near the Hauptbahnhof past the Reichstag to Potsdamer Platz. It will run next to the existing Nord-Süd Tunnel to Brandenburg Gate and separate from it to run to Potsdamer Platz. The first north–south S-Bahn tunnel was designed in 1939 with room for an additional two tracks at Potsdamer Platz and to its south for the new line. The cost of the S-Bahn line (phases 1 and 2) has been estimated at €317 million (2009 prices). The benefits of additional expenditure to the east of the Reichstag are still under investigation. This would increase the cost to about €330 million.

There are currently no dates set for the other phases of construction to the southern Ringbahn. It has so far only been defined in the Berlin land use plan.

=== Proposals for further extensions ===
Since reunification, there have been suggestions that lines that have not been used since 1961 or 1980 should be rebuilt and connected to the network by some new lines. Many of these plans have changed several times since then or have been abandoned.

Following a decision of the Berlin House of Representatives, the goal is essentially to restore the S-Bahn network to its extent in 1961. This was stated in an agreement between Deutsche Bahn, the Federal Ministry of Transport and the Senate on 4 November 1993. The network was to be restored by 2002. On this basis, the plans were included in the land use plan of 1995. In a study of the transport development by the then Department for Transport and Commerce in 1995, a plan was published for a network. Only the Jungfernheide–Stresow, Spandau–Staaken and Zehlendorf–Düppel sections, which had existed until 1980, were not incorporated in these plans. This political commitment is now only symbolic as some projects are now aimed at points beyond the original destinations or to miss them entirely. Budgetary difficulties, changing traffic flows and alternative development projects using Regionalbahn trains have led to the cancellation or postponement of projects that had already been developed.

Line	Projects
Lines closed in 1961
Blankenfelde – Rangsdorf (via Dahlewitz)	In the "hub Berlin – Building for the S-bahn" booklet published by S-Bahn Berlin in 2001, this route was still designated, though little has been said since then. The Rangsdorf community is trying to reconnect the S-Bahn. The mayor of the community has spoken in favor, and has formed a citizens' initiative. In the federal state transport plan Brandenburg 2008–2012 this route was advocated. The Confederation would provide funding to demonstrate the needs of this route. The state of Brandenburg has so far not carried out a planning approval procedure.
Spandau – Falkensee (- Finkenkrug) (via Nauener Straße, Hackbuschstraße, Albrechtshof, Seegefeld, and Falkensee Parkstadt)	The benefit of extending the S-Bahn from Spandau to Falkensee or Finkenkrug was substantiated in a profitability study by the Federal Government and the federal states of Berlin and Brandenburg. In March 2008, the project was awarded a cost-benefit ratio of 1: 1.31. With the construction of this route, the populous western part of Spandau would be connected to the rapid transit network. The execution is controversial. The former Berlin Senate from the SPD and Left Party was in favor of the construction, the Greens and the CDU of the Havelland district have opposed it. The city of Falkensee and the communities behind Finkenkrug fear a reduction in the RE and RB connections. If the budget situation of the city of Berlin improves, this route can be considered to be the most feasible – at least in Berlin. An investigation has shown that for the route to Hackbuschstraße a benefit-cost ratio of 2.64 exists. The construction costs for this section were estimated at 37 million euros in 2009. For an extension only within Berlin, however, the federal government rejects a promotion. An alternatively examined extension on the route of the Osthavelländischen railway to the Falkenseer Chaussee yielded a benefit cost factor far over 1, was however rejected by the district office Spandau.
Wannsee – Stahnsdorf (via Dreilinden)	The reconstruction of the route is now relatively complicated by the relocation of the Federal Highway 115. The route of the Friedhofsbahn is still dedicated to Berlin and Brandenburg. In particular, the Evangelical Church had an interest in the reopening of this route. It relied on old contracts with the railway and tried to sue the building. In the meantime, the lawsuit was dismissed and in 2014 the real estate company of Deutsche Bahn put the land for sale and allowed the demolition of the dilapidated bridge over the Teltow Canal.
Lines closed in 1980
Jungfernheide – Gartenfield (– Hakenfelde) (via Wernerwerk, Siemensstadt, Haselhorst and Daumstraße)	A reactivation of the Siemens railway, which would only be reasonable to operate with a structurally very expensive extension over the Havel to the water city Spandau (possibly to hook field), is very unlikely. An investigation into the continuation to Hakenfelde, in the planning line S21, has resulted in too high construction costs. The development of Siemensstadt itself has already been covered by the U7 underground line since 1980. While in 2001, the Deutsche Bahn had this route to Gartenfeld still designated as planning, in 2007 it requested the devaluation of this route at the Federal Railway Authority. The Senate is currently holding in the FNP at the connection to Gartenfeld.
Zehlendorf – Düppel (- Dreilinden Europarc) (via Zehlendorf Süd and Kleinmachnow Schleusenweg)	After the Second World War, after initial steam operation, 1948, the short section of Zehlendorf to Düppel prepared for the electric suburban railway and used until 1980. A cost-benefit analysis for a regional railway operation of the continuous trunk line from 2008 did not allow the necessary traffic for a reconstruction. Since 2008, there have been discussions to restore the trunk line between Zehlendorf and Griebnitzsee as S-bahn route. On 10 June 2009, the district Steglitz-Zehlendorf, the municipality Kleinmachnow, the Europarc Dreilinden and the Deutsche Bahn International GmbH presented a preliminary study on a possible S-Bahn operation on the eastern part of the route between Zehlendorf and the Europarc Dreilinden the public. This is not yet an official planning.
Lines closed in 1983 (Isolated operation after Berlin Wall was built)
Hennigsdorf – Velten (via Hennigsdorf Marwitzer Straße, Hennigsdorf Nord and Hohenschöpping)	The city of Velten has endeavored to reconnect with the S-Bahn network and commissioned a feasibility study in 2008. After the construction of the Wall, until 1983, a line of islands ran from Hennigsdorf to Velten. A cost-usage investigation has meanwhile been approved by Deutsche Bahn. Until 2001, this route was still official planning of the railway.
New lines
Wartenberg – Karower Kreuz (via Sellheimbrücke and Parkstadt); Springpfuhl – Grünauer Kreuz(via Biesdorfer Kreuz, Biesdorf Süd, Biesenhorst, Wuhlheide, FEZ, Spindlersfeld and Glienicker Straße)	This is a plan that was developed in the early 1960s in the GDR. In the 1980s, it was taken up again and expanded. Now additional connecting curves from the Berlin outer ring (BAR) to the Szczecin railway in the north (Karower cross) and the Görlitzer railway in the south (Grünauer cross) were provided. Also a connection to the Silesian railway at Wuhlheide station. By the end of the GDR were already provided by the German Reichsbahn some construction work, such. For example, the preparation of the rapid-transit railway route between Adlershof and Köllnische Vorstadt, a three-track S-Bahn route from Altglienicke to the bridge abutment on the north side of the Adlergestell and the route on the section Sellheimbrücke to Wartenberg. As part of these plans, the construction of a depot was also planned. These plans were adopted in the FNP, but not pursued for a long time. In the railway section Wartenberg – Sellheim bridge was still officially planned until 2001. In the spring of 2009, the House of Representatives of Berlin decided that the planning of the Nahverkehrstangente was to be prepared. Thereafter, however, a regional train was provided on the outer ring. At Karower Kreuz a new tower station for the regional train and the S-Bahn (S2) was to be created. However, this depends on the further development of the Szczecin railway in this section, which was not planned for 2015 at the earliest.
Teltow Stadt – Stahnsdorf (via Teltow Isarstraße and Stahnsdorf Lindenstraße)	The first considerations for such a rapid-transit railway connection were made already at the end of the 1930s in the context of the Germania plannings. First earthworks were also carried out during World War II. In 1991, this route was still official Senate planning. In later plans, such as the FNP of the community Stahnsdorf, the route is no longer included. In the regional planning Havelland Fläming, the joint state planning Berlin-Brandenburg and the LNVP Brandenburg the route is not included. Likewise, the state government is opposed to the route, as it is feared that the follow-up costs would be at the expense of peripheral parts of the country. To make matters worse, the crossing of newly created residential areas would be added. The ring closure includes the further construction over Dreilinden to Wannsee, as it is sought by local politicians.
Karow – Wandlitzsee (via Schönerlinde, Schönwalde, Basdorf and Wandlitz)	In 1976, a planning of this rapid-transit railway route came up in the GDR. This planning was not discussed by the Berlin City Council with any parent. However, it was taken up and persecuted until 1980. The S-Bahn would have replaced an existing suburban connection. The only implemented construction project was the connection of the so-called "Heidekrautbahn" to the S-Bahn station Karow. Officially, the plan was not abandoned until the end of the GDR, only after reunification were the plans rejected.
Anhalter Bahnhof – Plänterwald (via Kochstraße, Moritzplatz, Görlitzer Bahnhof, Lohmühlenstraße and Kiefholzstraße)	This route is a plan that was begun in the 1930s in connection with the Germania planning and was finally put on hold in the revision of the FNP of the Senate in 1985 on ice. During the construction of the underground station "Anhalter Bahnhof", overpass structures had already been built. At the Moritzplatz is located under the subway station in the shell of a finished interchange station, which was created in the 1920s for a subway line. As part of these plans he should be used for the S-Bahn. There are no other building services. At times, a direct connection from Kochstraße to Potsdamer Platz was planned.

=== New stations ===
Station	Line	Located between	Note
Arkenberge	Berlin Outer Ring	Blankenburg and Mühlenbeck-Mönchmühle	Construction provisions exist - plans abandoned
Biesdorfer Kreuz	Ostbahn	Friedrichsfelde Ost and Biesdorf	Access to local ring road
Blockdammweg	Schlesische Bahn	Betriebsbahnhof Rummelsburg and Karlshorst	
Bohnsdorfer Chaussee	Güteraußenring	Grünbergallee and Flughafen Berlin-Schönefeld	
Borsigwalde	Kremmener Bahn	Eichborndamm and Tegel	
Buch Süd	Stettiner Bahn	Karow and Buch	
Bucher Straße	Berlin Outer Ring	Blankenburg and Mühlenbeck-Mönchmühle	Preliminary work completed
Bürknersfelde	Berlin Outer Ring	Gehrenseestraße and Springpfuhl	Interchange with U11
Charlottenburger Chaussee	Spandauer Vorortbahn	Pichelsberg and Stresow	
Dudenstraße	Dresdener Bahn	Yorckstraße and Südkreuz	
Glasower Damm	Dresdener Bahn	Mahlow and Blankenfelde (Kr. Teltow-Fläming)	
Grünauer Kreuz	Görlitzer Bahn	Adlershof and Grünau	Access to bypass road
Kamenzer Damm	Dresdener Bahn	Attilastraße and Marienfelde	
Karower Kreuz	Stettiner Bahn	Blankenburg and Karow	In addition to a regional station and access to bypass road
Kiefholzstraße	Ringbahn	Treptower Park and Sonnenallee	
Komturstraße	Ringbahn	Hermannstraße and Tempelhof	Planned to be "Tempelhofer Feld"
Mahlow Nord	Dresdener Bahn	Lichtenrade and Mahlow	
Neues Ufer	Ringbahn	Beusselstraße and Jungfernheide	
Oderstraße	Ringbahn	Hermannstraße and Tempelhof	
Schönerlinder Straße	Berlin Outer Ring	Blankenburg and Mühlenbeck-Mönchmühle	
Schorfheidestraße	Nordbahn	Wilhelmsruh and Wittenau	
Wuhletalstraße	Wriezener Bahn	Mehrower Allee and Ahrensfelde	

== Accidents ==
Since the foundation of the Berlin S-Bahn, a number of accidents have occurred.

- On 15 December 1945, there was a head-on collision between a S-Bahn and a Nahgüterzug (local freight train) on the single-track Schöneweide–Spindlersfeld branch line. There were four dead and one seriously injured. The accident was caused by human error on the part of the dispatcher, who forgot the local freight train coming from Spindlersfeld and due to missing automatic block signaling and allowed a S-Bahn journey to Spindlersfeld.
- On 15 August 1948, a train arriving from Oranienburger Straße in the north-south S-Bahn tunnel collided with a stopped train in the curve of the Spree underpass. 63 people were injured. The reason given was that the railcar personnel did not exercise the required care for "line of sight" operation, by driving at about 20 km/h (12 mph) in a blind curve. Both were initially dismissed without notice, but were acquitted by a court and remained on duty.
- In the late afternoon of 18 December 1979, an S-Bahn train operating on the northern Berlin outer ring between Mühlenbeck and the Karow Cross collided with a just approaching freight train. The driver was killed in the accident, 20 passengers were injured, five of them seriously.
- In 1987, there were several derailments of BVG S-Bahn trains in the Berlin Nord-Süd Tunnel. After a train had been derailed before and behind the platform Friedrichstraße with the first bogie, there was a major incident in March 1987, when a northbound train derailed in the narrow left turn of the Spree underpass. The BVG railcar 275 227 slid along the tunnel wall for about 50 meters, severely damaging the cable and the car itself. No one was injured.
- On 20 October 1987, another train derailed with the penultimate bogie of the train in the tight right turn in front of the Berlin Brandenburger Tor station (then known as "Unter den Linden"). The last derailed car (275 319) fell out of profile and crashed into the platform, breaking a three-meter-long piece out of the edge and tearing a signal off the wall. On 2 November 1987, exactly at the same place, there was again a derailment of the last car (275 435). This also got out of profile and again rammed the platform edge. Both accidents caused considerable damage, but no personal injury. As a cause for the total of six derailments was found:
  - While the BVG began to profile its wheel profiles according to the current UIC standard, the track layouts of the Deutsche Reichsbahn (DR) in the north-south S-Bahn tunnel did not meet the current requirements, which apparently led to compatibility problems (rail inclination DR 1:20, UIC 1:40).
  - After the transfer of the West Berlin S-Bahn to the BVG, the DR had completely removed the previously existing guard rails from the tight curves.
  - The Deutsche Reichsbahn had dismantled all curve lubrication devices on the track arches, which had greatly increased the tendency to climb the wheel arches. In connection with the other two points it had to come to the derailments. As a consequence, the DR rebuilt the lubricators and imposed a speed reduction from 50 to 40 km/h (31 to 25 mph). The BVG marked all the quarter-trains that already carried the new UIC profile with a yellow line under the company number. These cars were excluded from driving through the tunnel.
- On 21 October 2001, at Ostkreuz and on 13 May 2002, at Hackescher Markt, rear-end collisions occurred which gave rise to the introduction of speed monitoring. At Ostkreuz, two trains of the class 485 collided late on Sunday evening, when the approaching train could not be stopped in time for emergency braking. The driver claimed to have initiated the required speed reduction before the stop signal, however, no evidence could be found to confirm this claim. Instead, the court presumed the driver was inattentive shortly before the end of the shift, and ignored the previous signal. Twelve people were injured and there were 190,000 euros in property damage. Also at Hackescher Markt station, experts were unable to identify any problems with the brake system of the 481 model series involved, which could explain the excessive speed at the entrance to the occupied track of the platform. Here 13 people were injured, again mainly by broken discs. In both cases, a fine was imposed on train drivers who both no longer drive trains.
- On 10 August 2004, a class 480 suburban railway car caught fire in the underground Anhalter station. The cause was a cabling fault in the brake resistor fan. The station suffered severe damage, had to be closed and rehabilitated for several months, but there were no casualties. The costs for the renovation were given as a total of 5.5 million euros. As a result of this accident, it was decided to outfit all underground stations with at least two exits, analogous to the Berlin subway. In practice, this concerns only the stations Oranienburger Straße and Anhalter Bahnhof, the latter received another southern exit in the direction of Tempodrom.
- On 20 November 2006, at 10:25 am, an S-Bahn train on the S25 line in the direction of Hennigsdorf in Südkreuz station hit an occupied track and collided with a work train. The impact threw passengers through the car, injuring 33 of the approximately 100 passengers, two of them seriously. The work train, a track gauge, had travelled the track before and covered the rails with a film of water. As a result of this film, the following class 481 S-Bahn train slid out of the area during braking in the station area and landed on the work train. As a consequence of this accident was ordered that the vehicles of the Berlin S-Bahn enter stations more slowly. As a result of the accident, the maximum speed allowed on all 481 Series trains in February 2008 was reduced to 80 km/h (50 mph). Only after the modification of the anti-slip system are higher speeds to be driven again.
- On 1 May 2009, an S-Bahn train of the class 481 in Kaulsdorf derailed due to a broken wheel. According to S-Bahners, the scheduled main investigation of the derailed train had been postponed for two years. As a consequence, this accident led to the subsequent chaos in 2009, since the test intervals were shortened and therefore at times only 165 out of 552 required quarter trains were available. Eventually, all axes had to be replaced because they were generally considered to be inadequate.
- On 21 August 2012, an S-Bahn line S25 moving towards Hennigsdorf derailed when crossing a turnout in the northern exit of Tegel station. Five passengers were injured, the driver suffered shock and also had to be cared for medically.

== See also ==
- List of Berlin S-Bahn stations
- List of metro systems
- Rail transport in Germany
