= DRG Class ET 169 =

Berlin S-Bahn electric multiple units

DR Class 169
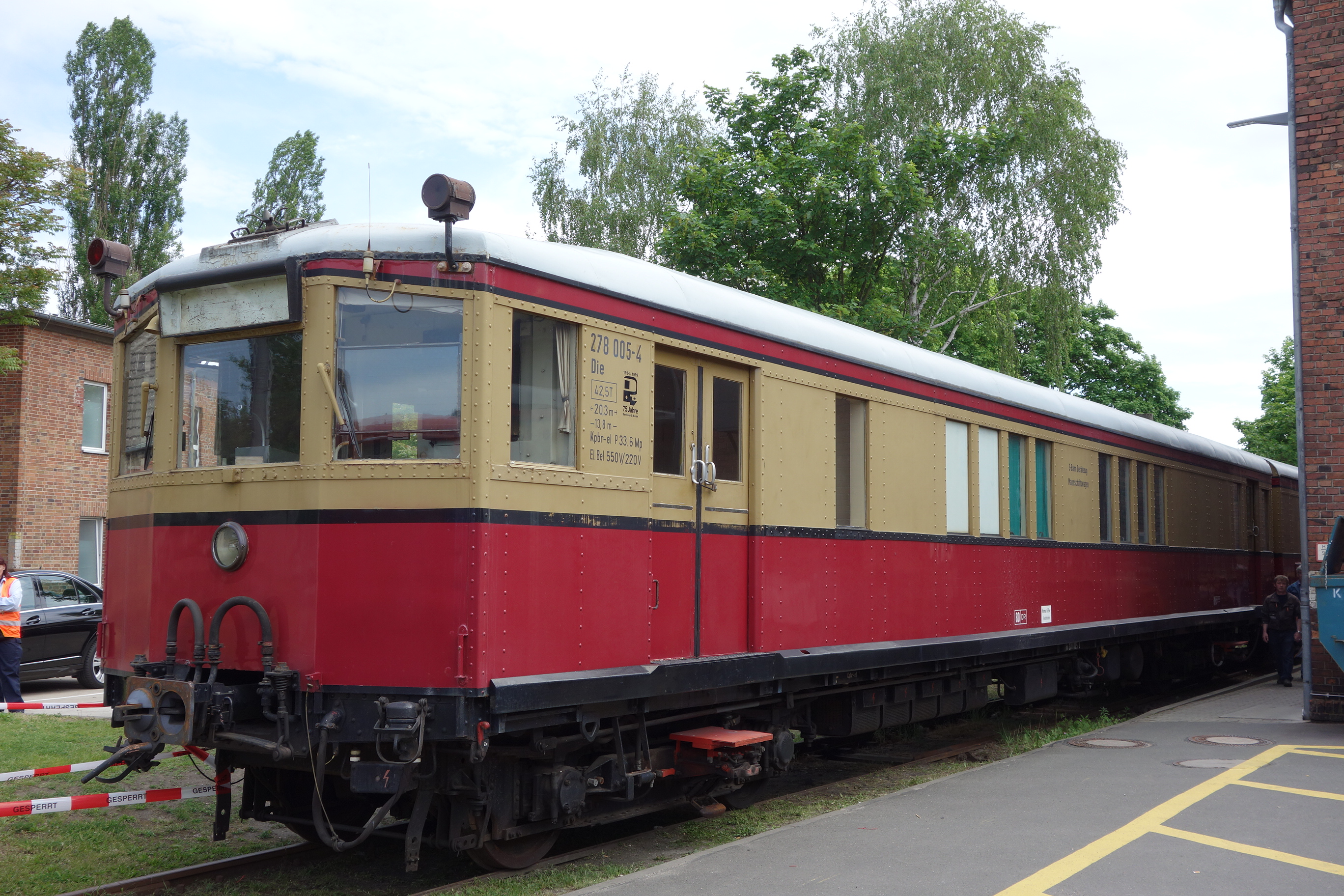
- A preserved ET 169 train in 2014
- Manufacturer: Wegmann (Kassel), Linke-Hofmann (Breslau), WUMAG, electric: AEG, SSW, BEW, MSW
- Constructed: 1925
- Scrapped: 1969
- Number built: 17 power cars, 17 trailer cars

Specifications
- Train length: 36.2 m (118 ft 9 in)
- Maximum speed: 90 km/h (56 mph)
- Weight: 59 t (58 long tons; 65 short tons)
- Electric system(s): 750 V DC third rail
- Current collector(s): Contact shoe
- UIC classification: Bo′Bo′+2′2′
- Safety system(s): Mechanical train stop
- Track gauge: 1,435 mm (4 ft 8 1/2 in) standard gauge

The DR Class ET 169 (until 1941: Type "Bernau") was the first class of electric multiple units for use on the Berlin S-Bahn commuter lines. 17 five car units were ordered by the Deutsche Reichsbahn in 1925, each comprising two motor cars with bogies and three short four-wheelers. They were intended for service on the northern lines from Stettiner Station to the rural towns Bernau, Oranienburg and Velten.

== History ==
Already before the electrified S-Bahn came about, there was a trial for the electrified commuter trains running from Potsdamer Wannseebahnhof to Zehlendorf in 1902 and from Potsdamer Ringbahnhof to Lichterfelde Ost from 1903. Also in 1903, the AEG company ran an overhead wire test track from Niederschöneweide to Spindlersfeld. Electrification has also came about to the solutions to increase capacity along the Hamburg-Altonaer Stadt- und Vorortbahn.

World War I interrupted the electrification plans from 1914 to 1918, which, however, were revived just afterwards. In 1920 the Prussian state railways ordered six test trains, which were first pulled by steam locomotives until electrification commenced in 1923. One year later, on 8 August 1924, the first section from Stettiner Vorortbahnhof to Bernau was inaugurated; the two other northern railway lines to Oranienburg and Velten (Kremmen Railway) followed until 1927. To service all electrified connections, Deutsche Reichsbahn purchased 34 power cars and 51 trailers in total.

In everyday operation, however, the engines soon proved to be too weak and already in 1925 upgraded versions (the later DR Class ET 168 and ET 165) were ordered in large numbers. Moreover, the ET 169 railcars were too large to pass the Berlin Nord-Süd Tunnel opened in 1936, and had to be deployed on the Ringbahn line. Plans for a withdrawal from service were not carried out due to the wagon shortage during World War II.

After the war, the East German Deutsche Reichsbahn had planned to use modernized ET 169 trains on branch lines from Wannsee to Stahnsdorf and from Zehlendorf to Düppel, or as additional trains on the northern Ringbahn and on the Siemensbahn branch from Jungfernheide. However, when the Berlin S-Bahn was divided due to the construction of the Berlin Wall in 1961, they were all again allocated to the Oranienburg, Bernau and Velten stretches of the line.

The trainsets were phased out from 1962 and most trains were withdrawn in 1969. Some components were re-used for the rolling stock of the East Berlin U-Bahn line E.

== Surviving carriages ==
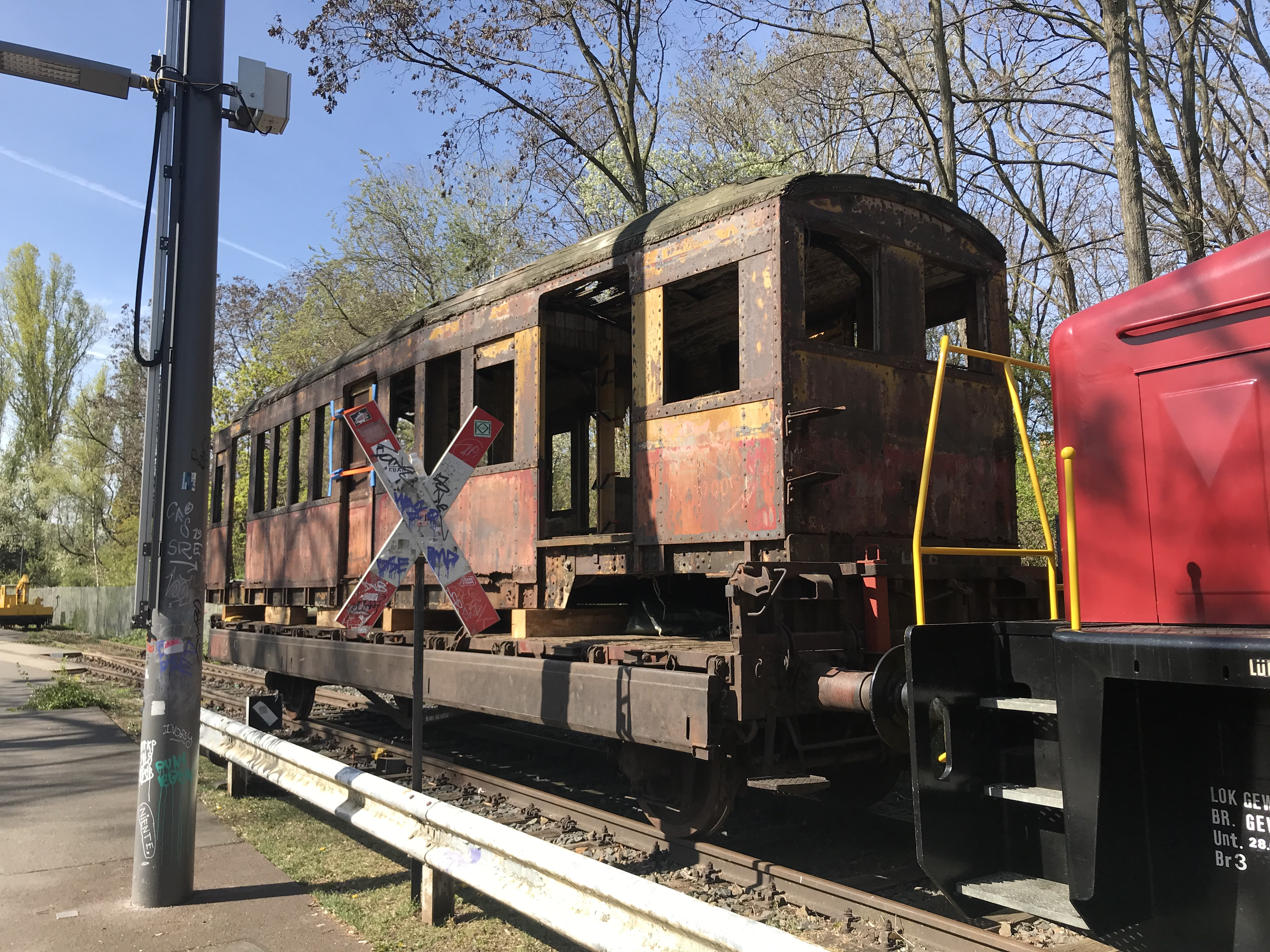
Remains of EMU motor car ET 169 005b being shunted within the premises of the German Museum of Technology

Motor unit ET 169 005b, withdrawn as early as 1943, survived as a grounded body. Its remains were acquired by the German Museum of Technology in 2019. The museum also owns trailing coach EB 169 005a while two more of these four-wheelers (EB 169 002b and EB 169 006c) are privately owned. Berlin S-Bahn and the Technology Museum are considering their restoration for S-Bahn centennial celebrations due in 2024.

== See also ==
- History of the Berlin S-Bahn
