= DRG Class ET 168 =

DRG Class 168
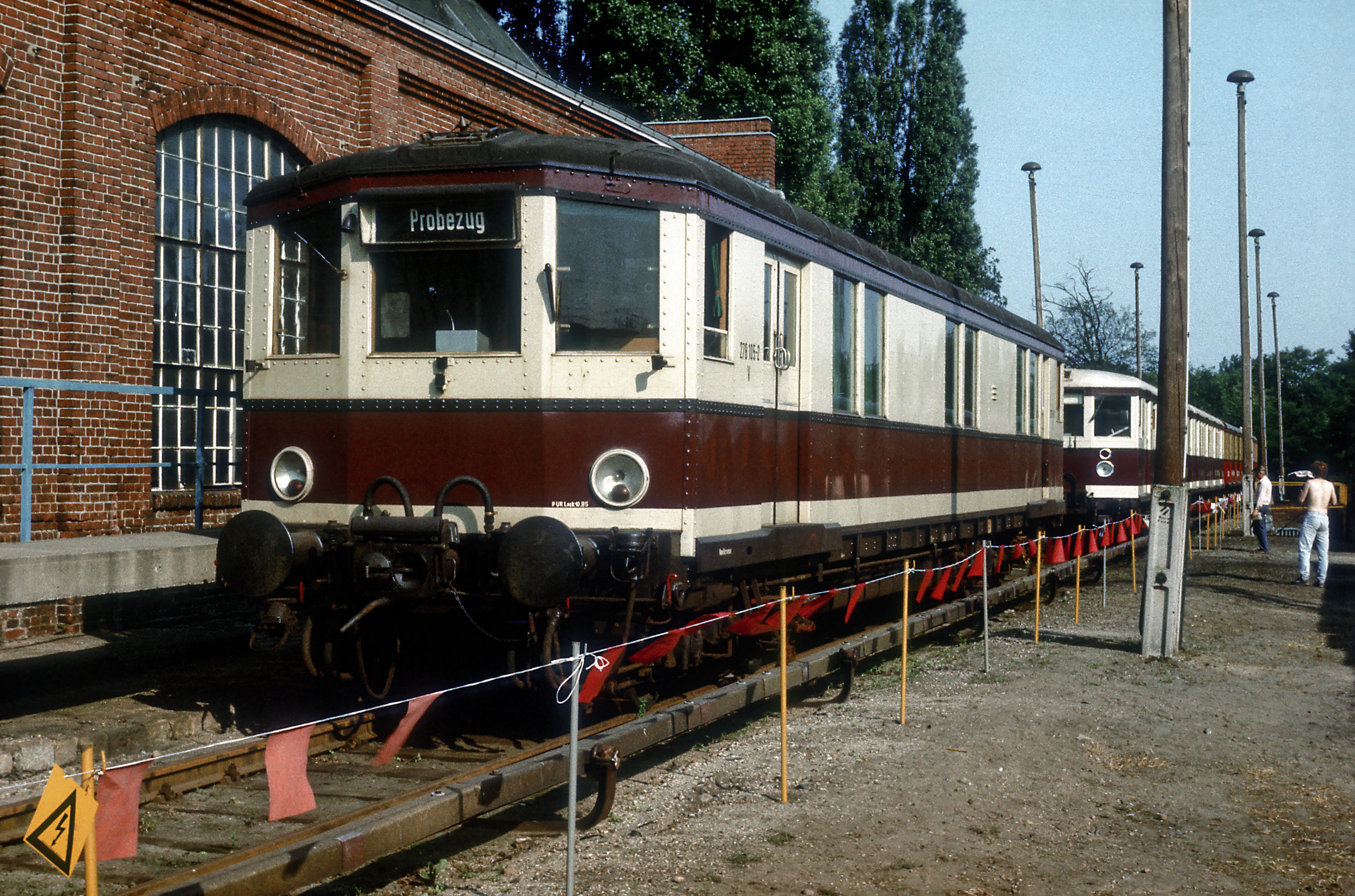
- A preserved ET 168 train in 1986
- Manufacturer: Wegmann (Kassel), Linke-Hofmann (Breslau), WUMAG, electric: AEG, SSW, BEW, MSW
- Constructed: 1925
- Scrapped: 1942-1962
- Number built: 17 power cars, 17 trailer cars

Specifications
- Train length: 36.2 m (118 ft 9 in)
- Maximum speed: 90 km/h (56 mph)
- Weight: 59 t (58 long tons; 65 short tons)
- Electric system(s): 750 V DC Third rail
- Current collector(s): Contact shoe
- UIC classification: Bo'Bo'+2'2'
- Safety system(s): mechanical train stop
- Track gauge: 1,435 mm (4 ft 8 1/2 in) standard gauge

The DR Class ET 168 (until 1941: Type "Oranienburg") was the second electric multiple unit that operated on the newly electrified Berlin S-Bahn lines. 17 trainsets in total were ordered by the Deutsche Reichsbahn in 1925 for delivery into the northern suburbs of Berlin.

== History ==
Already before the electrified S-Bahn came about, there was a trial for electrified commuter trains running from Potsdamer Wannseebahnhof to Zehlendorf in 1902 and from Potsdamer Ringbahnhof to Lichterfelde Ost from 1903. Also in 1903, the AEG company ran an overhead wire test track from Niederschöneweide to Spindlersfeld. Electrification also came about as part of the solution to increase capacity along the Hamburg-Altonaer Stadt- und Vorortbahn.

World War I interrupted the electrification plans from 1914 to 1918, which, however, were revived just afterwards. In 1920 the Prussian state railways ordered six test trains, which were first pulled by steam locomotives until electrification commenced in 1923. One year later, on 8 August 1924, the first section from Stettiner Vorortbahnhof to Bernau was inaugurated; the two other northern railway lines to Oranienburg and Velten (Kremmen Railway) followed until 1927. To service all electrified connections, Deutsche Reichsbahn purchased 34 power cars and 51 trailers in total.

In everyday operation, however, the engines soon proved to be too weak and already in 1925 upgraded versions (the later DR Class ET 168 and ET 165) were ordered in large numbers.

After the war, the East German Deutsche Reichsbahn had planned to use modernized ET 169 trains on branch lines from Wannsee to Stahnsdorf and from Zehlendorf to Düppel, or as additional trains on the northern Ringbahn and on the Siemensbahn branch from Jungfernheide. But when the Berlin S-Bahn was divided due to the construction of the Berlin Wall in 1961, they were all again allocated to the Oranienburg, Bernau and Velten stretches of the line.

The trainsets were phased out from 1962 and most trains were withdrawn in 1969. Some components were re-used for the rolling stock of the East Berlin U-Bahn line E.

== See also ==
- History of the Berlin S-Bahn
