= DRG Class ET 125 =

DR Class 125
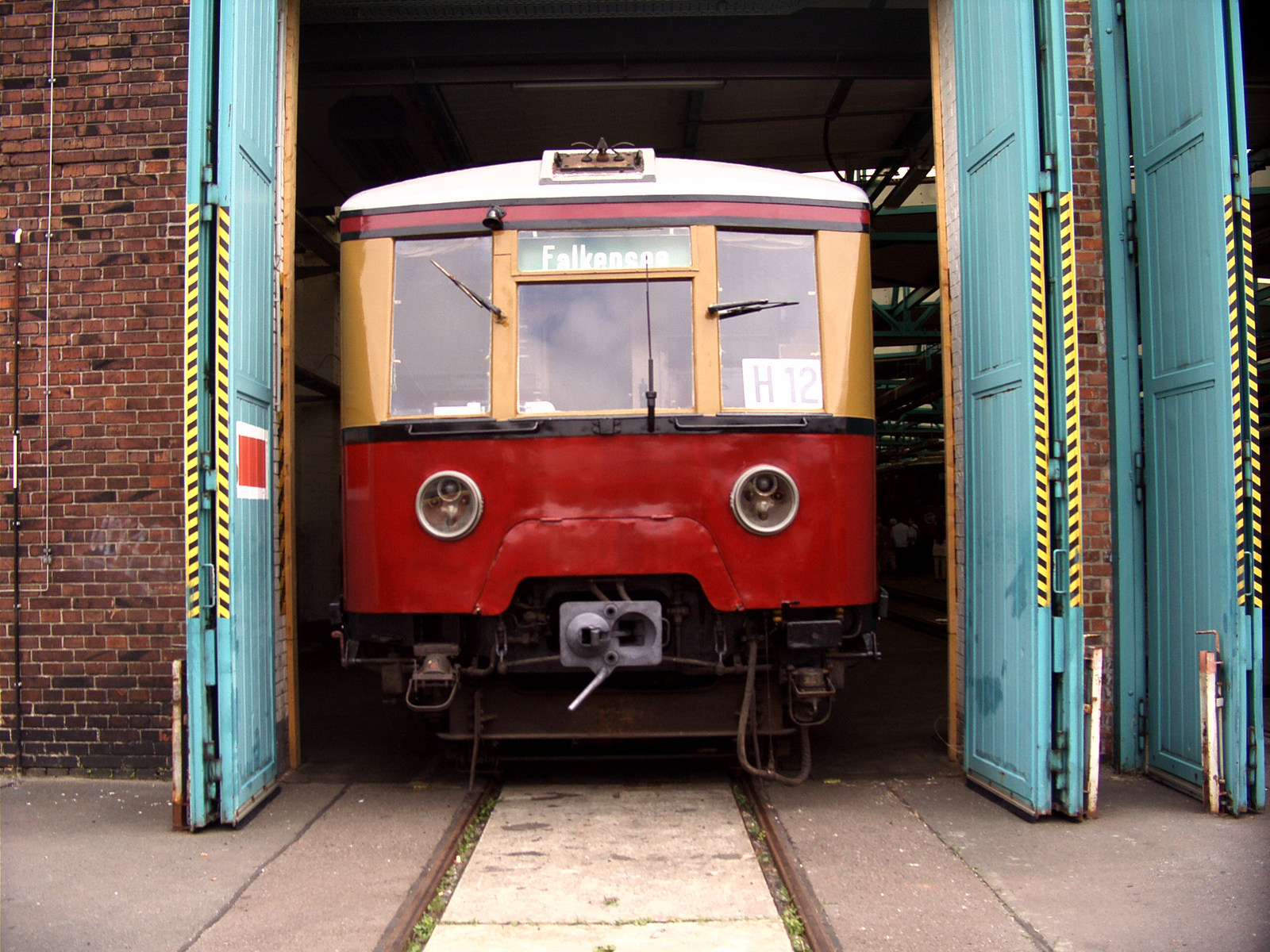
- ET 166 047 (adapted from ET 125) in Erkner
- Manufacturer: O&K, Dessauer Waggonfabrik, Wegmann – Wagenkästen; AEG, SSW – elektrischer Teil
- Constructed: 1934-1935
- Scrapped: 2003
- Number built: 18 power cars, 18 trailer cars

Specifications
- Train length: 36.2 m (118 ft 9 in)
- Maximum speed: 90 km/h (56 mph)
- Weight: 59 t (58 long tons; 65 short tons)
- Electric system(s): 750 V DC third rail
- Current collector(s): Contact shoe
- UIC classification: Bo'Bo'+2'2'
- Safety system(s): mechanical train stop
- Track gauge: 1,435 mm (4 ft 8 1/2 in) standard gauge

The 1941 Class ET 125, later adjusted series 276.0 (DR) or 477 (DBAG), was an electric railcar which traversed the DC-powered S-Bahn in Berlin during 1934/35. It was built in 1936 and 1938. The cars, which were popularly known as banker trains, were rebuilt after World War II and the series ET / EB 166 adapted. Among other things, they lost the more powerful 1949/50 traction motors. From the 1970s, they were included in the modernization program and in series 277 rebuilt (after 1991 477/877), they were used on Berlin's S-Bahn network until 2003.

These trains were deployed when the section between Potsdamer Ringbahnhof and Wannsee were electrified including the part of Zehlendorf stretch.
