= Transportation in Neukölln =

Transportation in the Neukölln quarter of Berlin

Transportation in Neukölln comprises the public and private transport systems serving the Neukölln quarter of Berlin. The quarter is served by the Berlin U-Bahn, Berlin S-Bahn, bus and road networks, together with cycling and pedestrian infrastructure, inland waterways and freight railways. These networks connect Neukölln with the rest of Berlin, Brandenburg and Berlin Brandenburg Airport, while the Neukölln Harbor remains an important centre for freight transport.

Because of its dense urban character, transport in Neukölln is dominated by walking, cycling and public transport. Since the early 21st century, transport planning has increasingly focused on improving conditions for pedestrians and cyclists, reducing motor traffic, and expanding public transport. Future projects include planned extensions to the U-Bahn and tram networks, new bus services and other improvements to regional connectivity.

== Overview ==
Neukölln is one of Berlin's most densely populated inner-city quarters and is served by an extensive multimodal transportation network. Public transport is centred on two U-Bahn lines (U7 and U8), four S-Bahn lines and an extensive network of bus routes, which connect the quarter with central Berlin, surrounding districts, Brandenburg and Berlin Brandenburg Airport. Although Neukölln has no regional rail stations of its own, nearby stations such as Südkreuz, Ostkreuz and Schöneweide provide direct access to regional and long-distance rail services. The quarter is also served by major arterial roads, the A100 and A113 autobahns, extensive cycling and pedestrian infrastructure, inland waterways and freight railways.

The latest modal share data, based on a 2023–24 survey, shows that Neukölln's residents have changed their travel behaviour significantly since the previous 2018 study. Walking accounted for 33.3% of all trips, followed by public transport at just under 24%, cycling at 21.8% and private automobiles at 21.3%. Compared with the Berlin average, cycling has become more common while automobile use has declined. Public transport use remains slightly below the citywide average, largely because many daily destinations are within walking or cycling distance in the densely developed northern neighbourhoods, while southern parts of the borough beyond the Ringbahn remain less well served by rapid transit.

== Public transport ==
Berlin's S-Bahn commuter rail, which also services Berlin's suburbs and the greater Berlin area, is managed by the S-Bahn Berlin GmbH, a subsidiary of Deutsche Bahn, while the regional commuter trains Regionalbahn (RB) and Regional-Express (RE) as well as the FEX airport express are managed directly by the Deutsche Bahn or regional franchisees. The U-Bahn rapid transit system, public ferries as well as bus and tram lines are operated by the Berliner Verkehrsbetriebe (BVG). (Note: Exceptions are privately operated tramways like the Wuhlheide park railway or the Britzer Garten tramway; the VBB integration of the aerial tramway in the Gärten der Welt has often been proposed, but was declined until 2026; Stefan Ziller in: "Marzahn: Seilbahn in den Gärten der Welt bleibt von BVG getrennt – das ist der Grund", Berliner Zeitung, 24 September 2024.) Together with the Brandenburg public transport providers, the S-Bahn and BVG form the network group Verkehrsverbund Berlin-Brandenburg (VBB). The BVG service center closest to the quarter Neukölln is located at Alexanderplatz U-Bahn station. VBB tickets are also valid on the Deutsche Bahn's regional lines. Aside from the S-Bahn, Neukölln does not have any regional commuter lines. The closest directly reachable RB and RE stations are Alexanderplatz, Ostkreuz, Schöneweide and Südkreuz.

=== U-Bahn ===
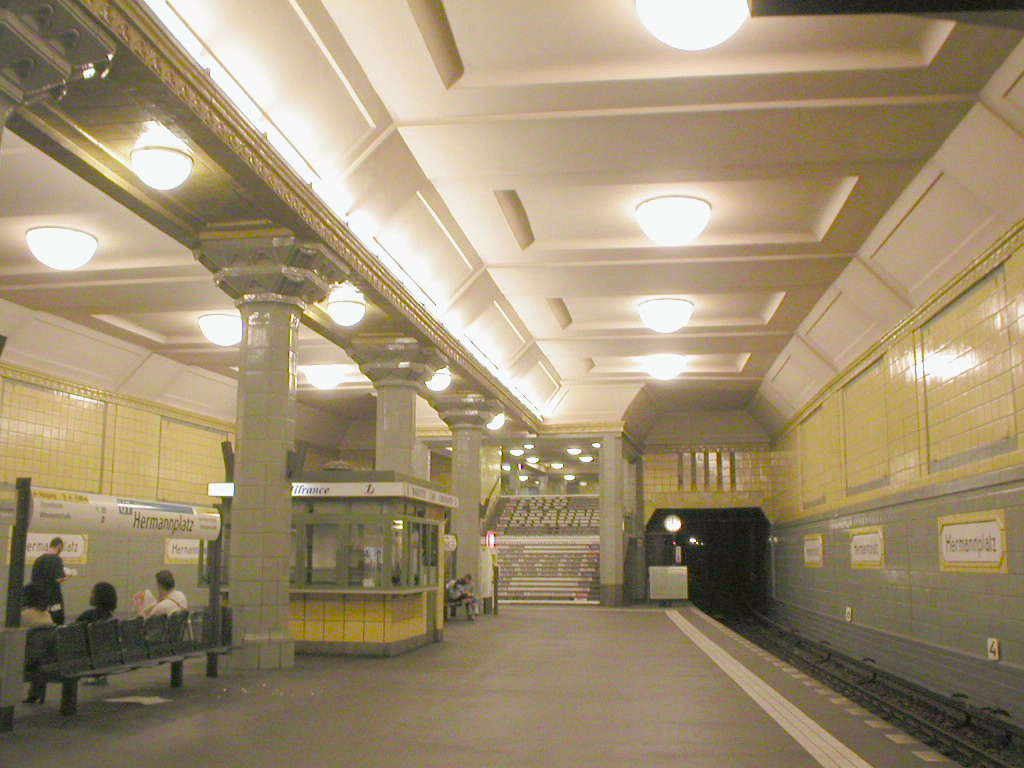
Hermannplatz U-Bahn station

Neukölln is served by two U-Bahn subway lines, the northwest-to-southeast U7 (Rathaus Spandau ↔ Rudow) via Jungfernheide and Wilmersdorfer Straße/Charlottenburg, and the north-to-south U8 (Wittenau ↔ Hermannstraße) via Alexanderplatz, with an interchange between the two at Hermannplatz. (Note: For an overview including their history of construction, cf. e.g. Alexander Seefeldt, Robert Schwandl, Berliner U-Bahn-Linien: U7 – Quer durch den Westen, Berlin, 2013; Axel Mauruszat, Alexander Seefeldt, Berliner U-Bahn-Linien: U8 – Von Gesundbrunnen nach Neukölln, Berlin, 2015.) Within Neukölln, the U7 has three additional eastbound stations along the Karl-Marx-Straße: Rathaus Neukölln, Karl-Marx-Straße and Neukölln, the latter being an interchange between U- and S-Bahn. The U8 has three additional southbound stations along the Hermannstraße: Boddinstraße, Leinestraße and Hermannstraße, the latter being the quarter's second interchange between U- and S-Bahn.

Three U-Bahn stations just outside of the quarter offer quicker access to certain neighborhoods of Neukölln: Südstern (U7) to the western parts of Hasenheide, Schönleinstraße (U8) to the Reuterkiez, and Grenzallee (U7) to the southern and south-eastern industrial parks including the Neukölln Harbor.

During workday nights, approximately between 1:00 and 4:00, Berlin's subways are not operational, but are replaced by buses. In Neukölln, the U7 and U8 are replaced by the bus lines N7 and N8 respectively. During nights before Saturdays, Sundays and public holidays, the U-Bahn lines operate continuously.

=== S-Bahn ===
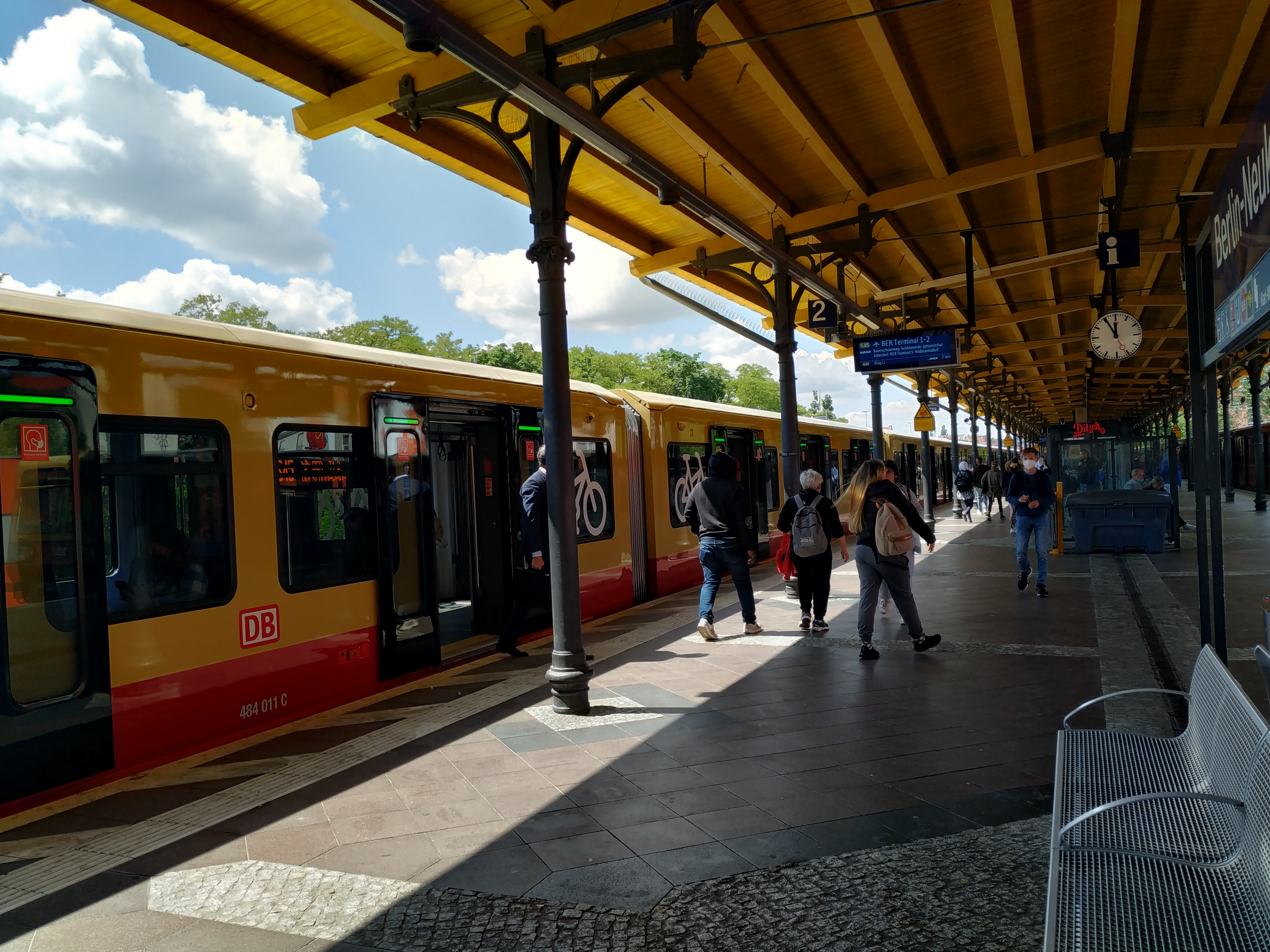
Neukölln S-Bahn station

Neukölln is served by four S-Bahn commuter lines, with U-Bahn interchanges at Berlin-Hermannstraße (U8) and Berlin-Neukölln (U7), each for all of the four lines. The shorter S47 connects the quarter to Südkreuz in the west, and via Baumschulenweg station, Niederschöneweide and the Schöneweide–Spindlersfeld branch line to Spindlersfeld in the south-eastern Dahme suburbs. The long-haul S46 connects Neukölln to Westend in the far west via Südkreuz, Westkreuz and Messe Nord/ZOB close to the Messe Berlin exhibition grounds, the ICC and Berlin's central bus station (ZOB). In the opposite direction, the S46 connects to the town Königs Wusterhausen south-east of Berlin via Baumschulenweg station, Adlershof, Grünau and the town Zeuthen. Two additional important services are the Ringbahn circle lines S41 (clockwise) and S42 (counter-clockwise), providing access to numerous U-Bahn and S-Bahn interchanges, and connecting through all of Berlin's crosses, Südkreuz, Westkreuz, Gesundbrunnen (Nordkreuz) and Ostkreuz with many intercity travel options. (Note: All except Westkreuz provide access to many Regionalbahn, Regional-Express, intercity and EuroCity trains, with Gesundbrunnen and Südkreuz also connected to Germany's Intercity Express network; in addition, the provider FlixTrain is operating from Südkreuz station.) Overall, Neukölln has four S-Bahn stations, the aforementioned Hermannstraße and Neukölln as well as Sonnenallee on the Ringbahn at the outskirts of Rixdorf, and Köllnische Heide on the southeastbound railway, providing S-Bahn access to the inhabitants of Weiße Siedlung, High-Deck-Siedlung and Schulenburgpark.

=== Bus ===
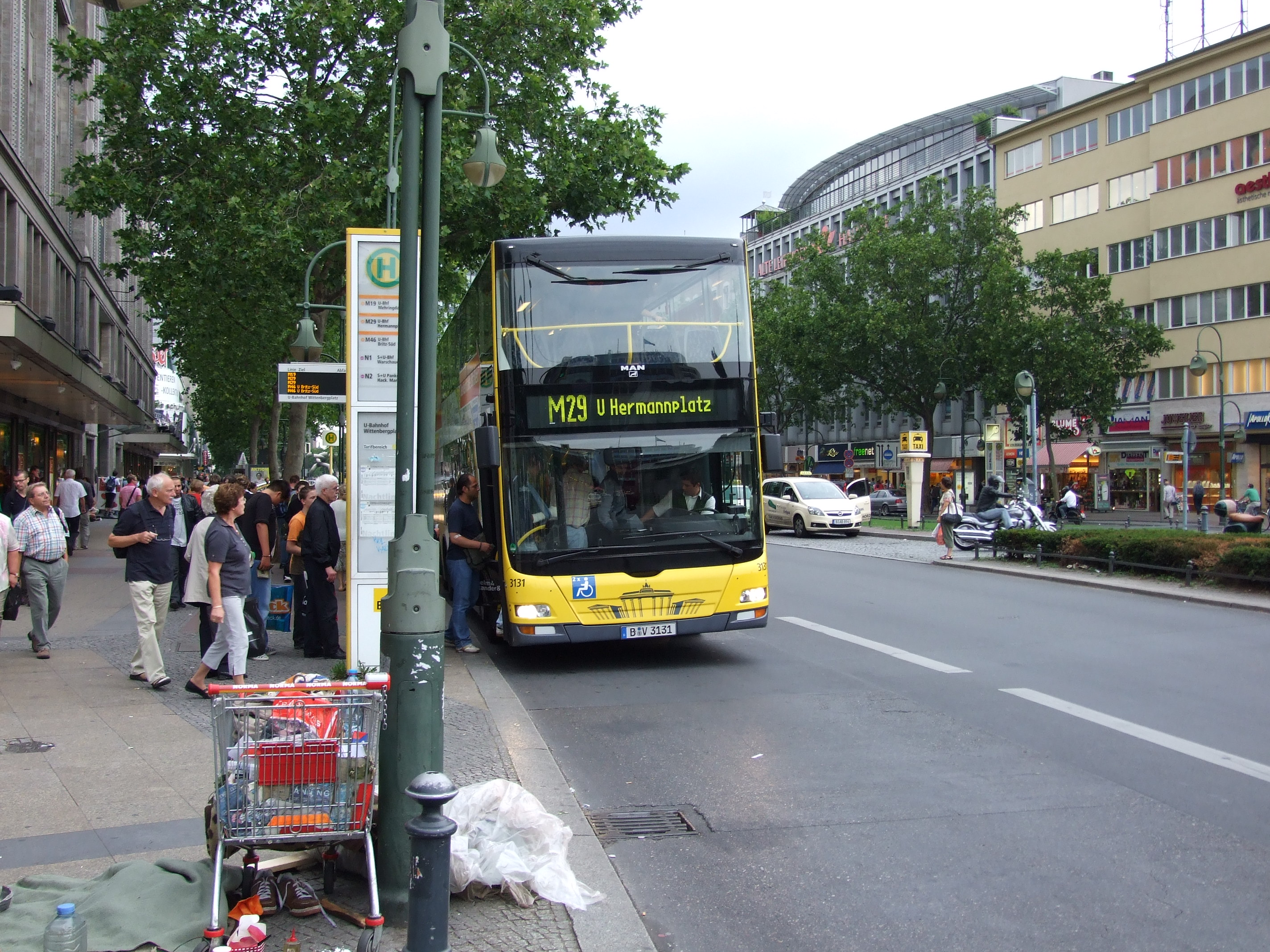
MetroBus M29 to Hermannplatz

Due to sufficient access to U- and S-Bahn for most areas of Neukölln, the quarter is currently not served by any of Berlin's ExpressBus lines. Still, Neukölln has several regular bus lines, connecting for example Marzahn (194) and Marienfelde (277). There are also four MetroBus lines, the most important ones being the M29 connecting via Checkpoint Charlie and the southern Potsdamer Platz area to the western city center including Kurfürstendamm, the M41 to Berlin Central Station via Potsdamer Platz, and the southbound M44 via Britzer Garten to Buckow-Süd, the terminus of a potential extension of the U-Bahn line U8 (see below). In addition to the N8 and N7 U-Bahn replacement bus lines during night hours (see above), Neukölln is served by several regular night bus lines, for example the N94, which connects Hermannplatz and Lichtenberg railway station via Ostkreuz.

=== Airport connections ===
Since the closing of the airports Tegel and Tempelhof, whose airfield was partially situated in Neukölln, Berlin only has one remaining international airport, Berlin Brandenburg Airport (BER), the former (and greatly extended) Berlin Schönefeld Airport just outside of Berlin. (Note: Another smaller airport northeast of Berlin, which is mainly used by charter planes, is Eberswalde–Finow Airport; it has always been a candidate for an expansion into a second international airport in the Berlin periphery; "Flugplatz Eberswalde-Finow: Ex-Militärlandeplatz mischt Tegel-Diskussion auf", Berliner Morgenpost, 11 August 2017.) Since the 2025 timetable change, which included the cancellation of the S-Bahn line S45, the quarter Neukölln has no direct daytime connection to the BER anymore.

When exclusively using the U-Bahn, an interchange between subway and the airport express bus lines X7 and X71 is necessary at the current U7 terminus Rudow. (Note: The minimum frequency in off-hours is every 10 minutes (X7 and X71 combined), while the X7 itself runs every 5 minutes in peak time.) If the S-Bahn is the primary mode of transport, BER passengers to and from Neukölln can use interchanges at Südkreuz station between S-Bahn and the FEX airport express train or the regional express train RE20, which both connect to the BER, and are usually the fastest routes between Neukölln and the airport. (Note: The FEX operates every 15 minutes between 4:00 and 0:30, and once every hour between 0:30 and 4:00, reaching the BER within 13–15 minutes. The RE20 operates once every hour between 4:00 and 21:00, reaching the BER within 15 minutes. Sonnenallee station connects to Südkreuz with the circle lines S41 and S42, Köllnische Heide with the lines S46 and S47, and the U-Bahn interchanges Hermannstraße and Neukölln with all four available S-Bahn lines.) A slightly longer alternate route is possible with an interchange at Schöneweide station between the S-Bahn lines S46 or S47 and the regional express trains RE24 or RE32. (Note: Combined, the two regional express lines operate every 30 minutes, reaching the BER within 11–12 minutes. Sonnenallee station on the Ringbahn, however, has no direct connection to Schöneweide (see below).) When exclusively using the S-Bahn, BER passengers to and from Neukölln need to use interchanges at Baumschulenweg station between the S46 or S47 (to and from Hermannstraße, Neukölln and Köllnische Heide) and the southern lines S85 and S9. (Note: Sonnenallee station has no direct public transport connection to the Baumschulenweg and Schöneweide stations, so the only options are using the circle lines, preferably with the FEX and RE20 western interchanges at Südkreuz, with the similarly fast eastern alternates RE24 or RE30 via Ostkreuz station, or with longer S-Bahn-only options using the eastern interchange at Treptower Park station between the circle lines and the S85 or S9.) During the night, the service on the U-Bahn line U7 is replaced by the night bus line N7, which directly connects Neukölln and the airport. (Note: Since the closing of the old Terminal 5 near Schönefeld, the daytime bus line 171 between Hermannplatz and BER has not been extended to reach the operational terminals 1–4: using this line, passengers need to interchange either at Rudow (X7/71) or at the terminus Schönefeld (S-Bahn). Furthermore, line 171 is eventually set to terminate at Rudow; cf. "Nahverkehrsplan Berlin 2019–2023", Senatsverwaltung für Umwelt, Verkehr und Klimaschutz, p. 282.)

=== Ferry ===
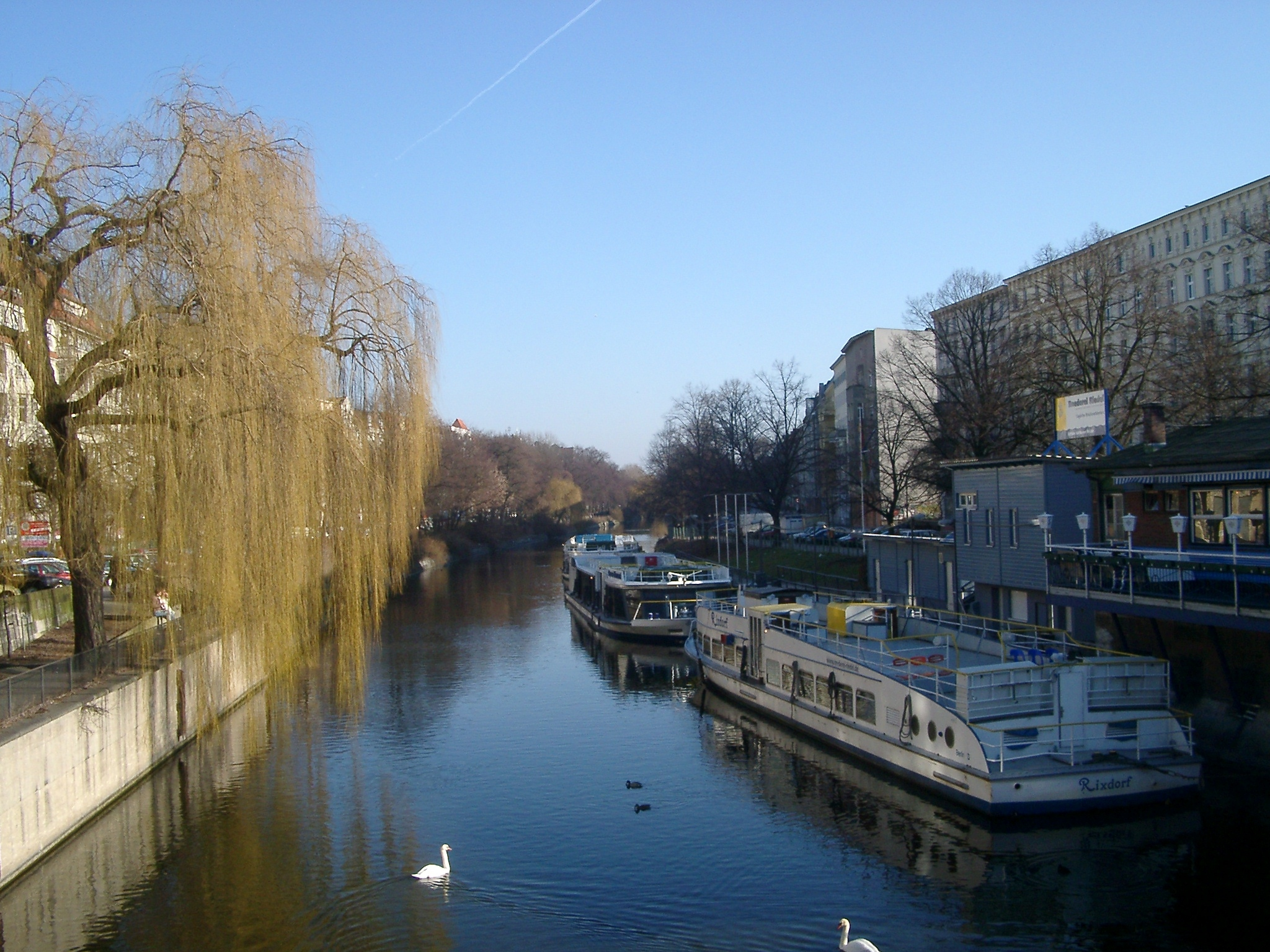
The Rixdorf at Kottbusser Brücke landing

Neukölln does not offer any regular public ferry transport, but several landing stages for a variety of private charter tours exist in Neukölln. Berlin shipping company Stern und Kreisschiffahrt, which is based at the Treptow Harbor, operates a landing at the Estrel Hotel on the Neukölln Ship Canal, with one route through Neukölln along the Landwehr Canal. Former Kreuzberg shipping company Reederei Riedel, which is now based at the Rummelsburg Harbor in Oberschöneweide, operates two landings, the Kottbusser Brücke at the Landwehr Canal, and the Wildenbruchbrücke at the Neukölln Ship Canal. One of their ships is the 1962 Rixdorf, which has been in their service since 1987 and is authorized for 250 passengers and crew. (Note: Depending on the source, the Rixdorf was built in 1962 or 1963. After its launch at the Ruhrort shipyard, it was first used on Lake Baldeney under the name Gruga. It was sold to Berlin in 1984 and rechristened Spreekieker. In 1987, it was resold to the Riedel shipping company and rechristened Rixdorf. It is 30.07 m (98.65 ft) long and 5.24 m (17.19 ft) wide, with a gauge of 1.23 m (4.04 ft) and a machine capacity of 180 PS (130 kW).)

== Individual transport ==
=== Motorized individual transport ===
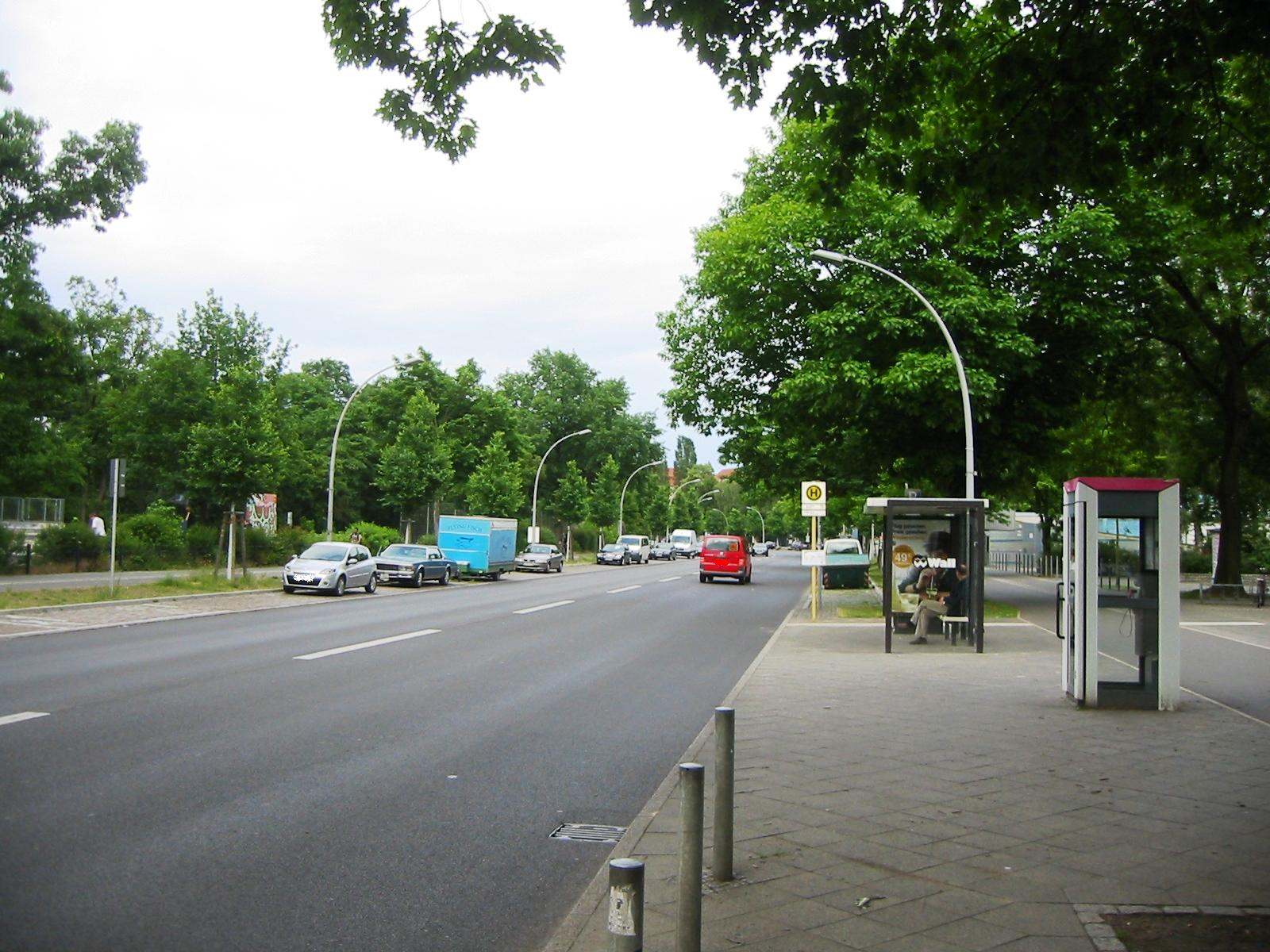
Columbiadamm

Since Neukölln is densely populated and highly urbanized, most of its streets come with a speed limit of 30 km/h (19 mph) for motorized vehicles, including more aggressive urban planning measures in recent years aimed at reducing traffic with one-way roads and concepts like the Spielstraße ("play street"), modal filters or larger-scale neighborhood blocks (Kiezblock, LTN). (Note: For example, these measures were introduced in the northern Reuterkiez in 2024 and have significantly reduced through traffic and the number of accidents; Madlen Haarbach, "Poller und Einbahnstraßen in Berlin-Neukölln: So haben sich die Unfallzahlen im Reuterkiez entwickelt", Tagesspiegel, 11 April 2025 (archived).) Furthermore, in 2024 the Senate of Berlin and the borough's administration have begun to monetize public parking space in the northern neighborhoods to steer away some of the excess traffic.

Nevertheless, several main roads function as important arterial connections to other parts of Berlin: Columbiadamm, Urbanstraße and Hasenheide connect to the western parts of Berlin south of the city center via Tempelhof and the western neighborhood of Kreuzberg 61 respectively, while Sonnenallee, Karl-Marx-Straße and Hermannstraße connect to southern and south-eastern parts of Berlin via Britz and Baumschulenweg respectively. The Kottbusser Damm is the main road to the SO 36 neighborhood of Kreuzberg in the north, but traffic calming measures have reduced its importance in recent years. Except for the Columbiadamm, all of the above arterial roads converge at Hermannplatz. None of Neukölln's large arterial roads are part of Germany's Bundesstraßen network.

The A100 autobahn at Neukölln's border with Britz connects to the western parts of Berlin, and via its most recent extension through parts of eastern Neukölln to Alt-Treptow. The A100 offers three exits and on-ramps in the Britz and Neukölln quarters, Britzer Damm with Hermannstraße, Buschkrugallee with Karl-Marx-Straße, and Sonnenallee. A highly contended final extension is planned to extend the A100 further into Friedrichshain and Lichtenberg via Ostkreuz. At the interchange Autobahndreieck Neukölln, the A100 connects to the A113 autobahn, which leads south to BER airport and the A10, Berlin's orbital autobahn. At the interchange, the A113 also has a direct on-ramp from Grenzallee, and an indirect exit to Grenzallee via Bergiusstraße.

Neukölln is part of Berlin's tight inner-city network of taxi and ridehailing services. Furthermore, free-floating carsharing is relatively widespread in urban Berlin. Still, the quarter Neukölln alone has more than ten dedicated carsharing stations, several of them also for transport vans.

=== Bicycle traffic ===
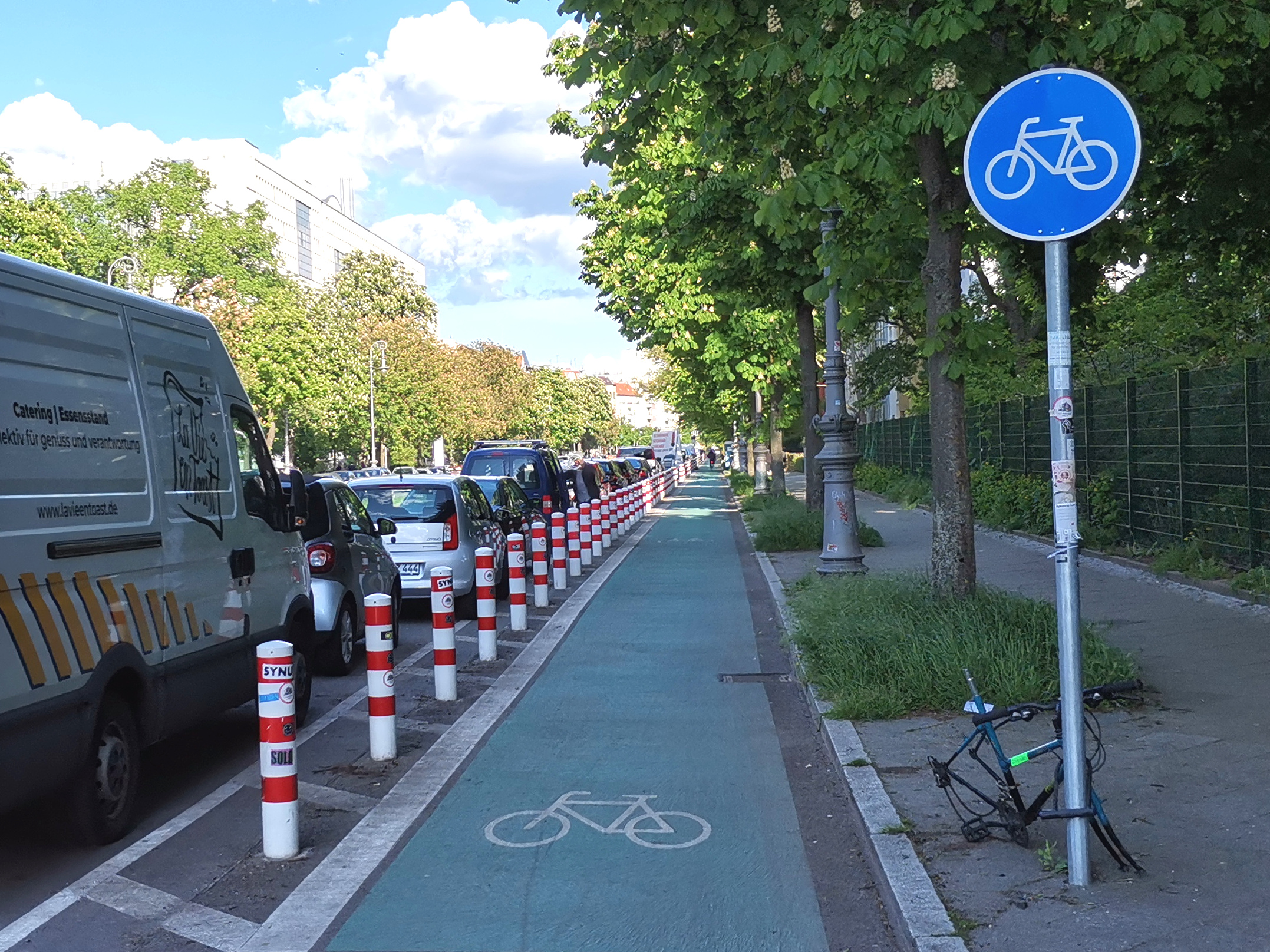
Bicycle lane, Hasenheide

Most of Neukölln's one-way streets are two-way for cyclists. In 2017, the western parts of Weserstraße opened as Neukölln's first bicycle boulevard, and in the following years, several side streets have been rededicated as such, at first especially in the trendier districts of Reuter- and Schillerkiez, but now slowly expanding into other neighborhoods. (Note: In 2025, the first bicycle boulevard opened in the Körnerkiez ("Umbau der Ilsestraße zur Fahrradstraße ist abgeschlossen", Bezirksamt Neukölln, 10 April 2025); for an overview of Neukölln's current and planned bicycle boulevards, including the Weserkiez extension into Rixdorf, cf. Michael Fugel (ed.), "infraVelo: Karte" s.v. "Neukölln § Fahrradstraße, GB infraVelo GmbH.) Larger main roads have been reconstructed to include properly separated bike lanes, for example Kottbusser Damm and Hasenheide, with plans for more reconstruction in the coming years. Neukölln's most ambitious project is the 20.2 km (12.55 mi) "Y route" (Y-Trasse), a forked dual bicycle highway (Radschnellverbindung) from south-eastern Berlin through Neukölln to Kreuzberg. (Note: The initial joint section of the route will pass from Adlershof along the Teltow Canal through Johannisthal and Baumschulenweg, and will then split near the Britz quarter, with branches leading through (a) Britz and western Neukölln to the Tempelhofer Feld and Südstern (Kreuzberg 61), and (b) through eastern Neukölln and Alt-Treptow to Görlitzer Park and Wiener Straße (Kreuzberg SO 36) respectively; Michael Fugel (ed.), "Y-Trasse: Von Adlershof nach Neukölln und Kreuzberg", infraVelo, August 2024.) Berlin and Neukölln have several bicycle-sharing systems with a large fleet of standard and electric bicycles, as well as cargo bikes and e-scooters.

=== Pedestrian traffic ===
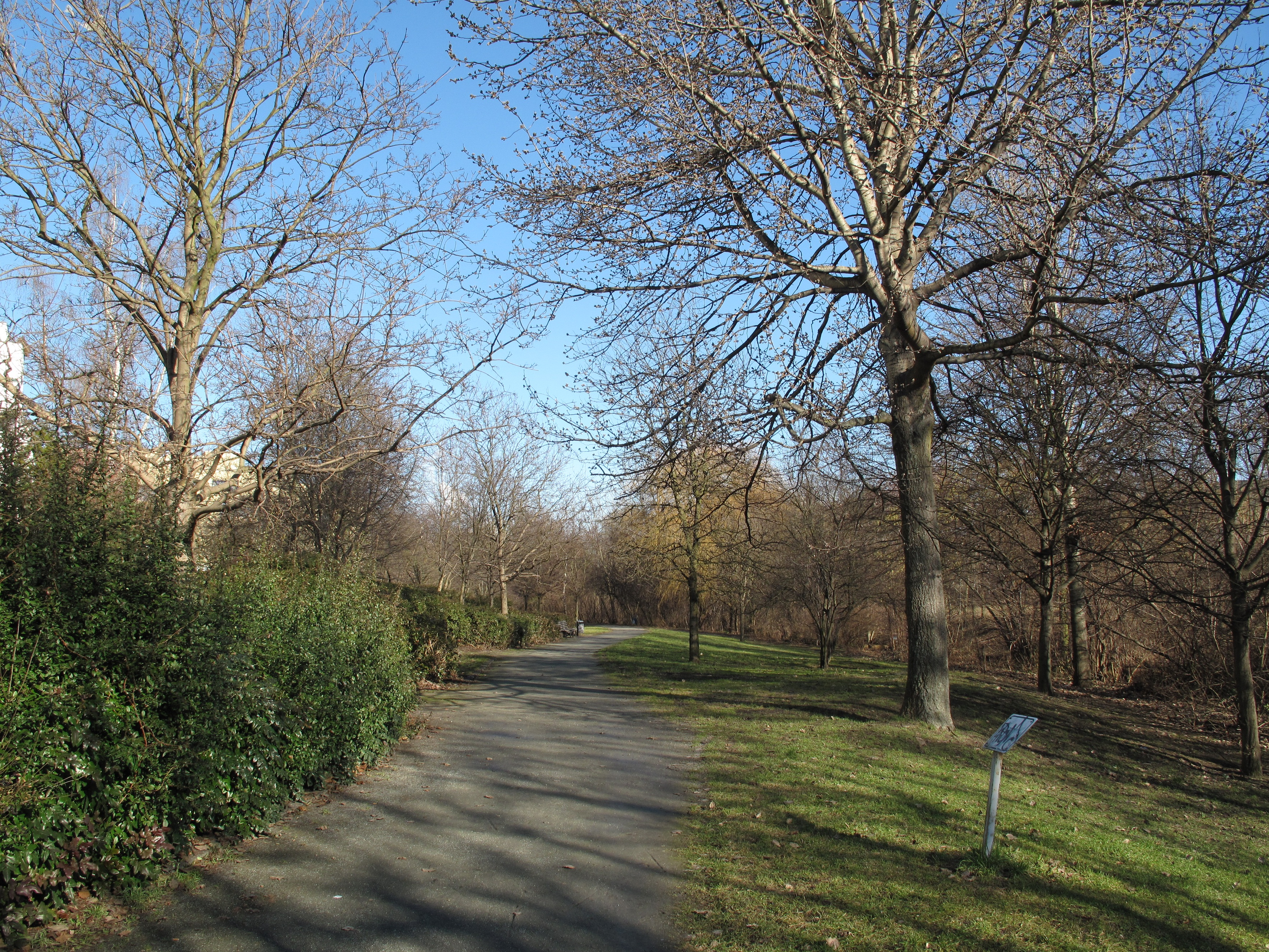
Heidekamppark

Due to Berlin's usually broad sidewalks, extensive speed limits, especially on side streets, and other measures like play streets and an increasing number of one-way streets, Neukölln has become a rather safe environment for pedestrians. However, compared to other German cities, very few pedestrian zones exist in Neukölln, currently only the "youth street" Rütlistraße (Reuterkiez) and the Tempelhofer Feld. There are proposals and concrete plans to rededicate certain locations as either pedestrian zones or mixed zones for pedestrians and cyclists, for example the Elbestraße and Weichselstraße in the Reuterkiez.

Several hiking trails exist along the waterways within or bordering Neukölln, primarily the Landwehr Canal, parts of the Neukölln Ship Canal, the Britz Canal, and the Heidekampgraben in the east, which is part of Berlin's Mauerweg. Other green trails are limited to Neukölln's parks, especially the Hasenheide, the Tempelhofer Feld, the Carl-Weder-Park, and the eastern garden plots. However, due to Neukölln's highly urbanized and partially industrialized character, few of the trails are sufficiently interconnected, as it is often found in the suburban quarters of Berlin. Still, Trail 18 of Berlin's officially designated Grüne Hauptwege (main green trails) leads from the Tempelhofer Feld through Neukölln's western cemeteries and parks, Alt-Rixdorf and along the Neukölln Ship Canal via Trusepark into Kreuzberg and beyond.

== Freight transport ==
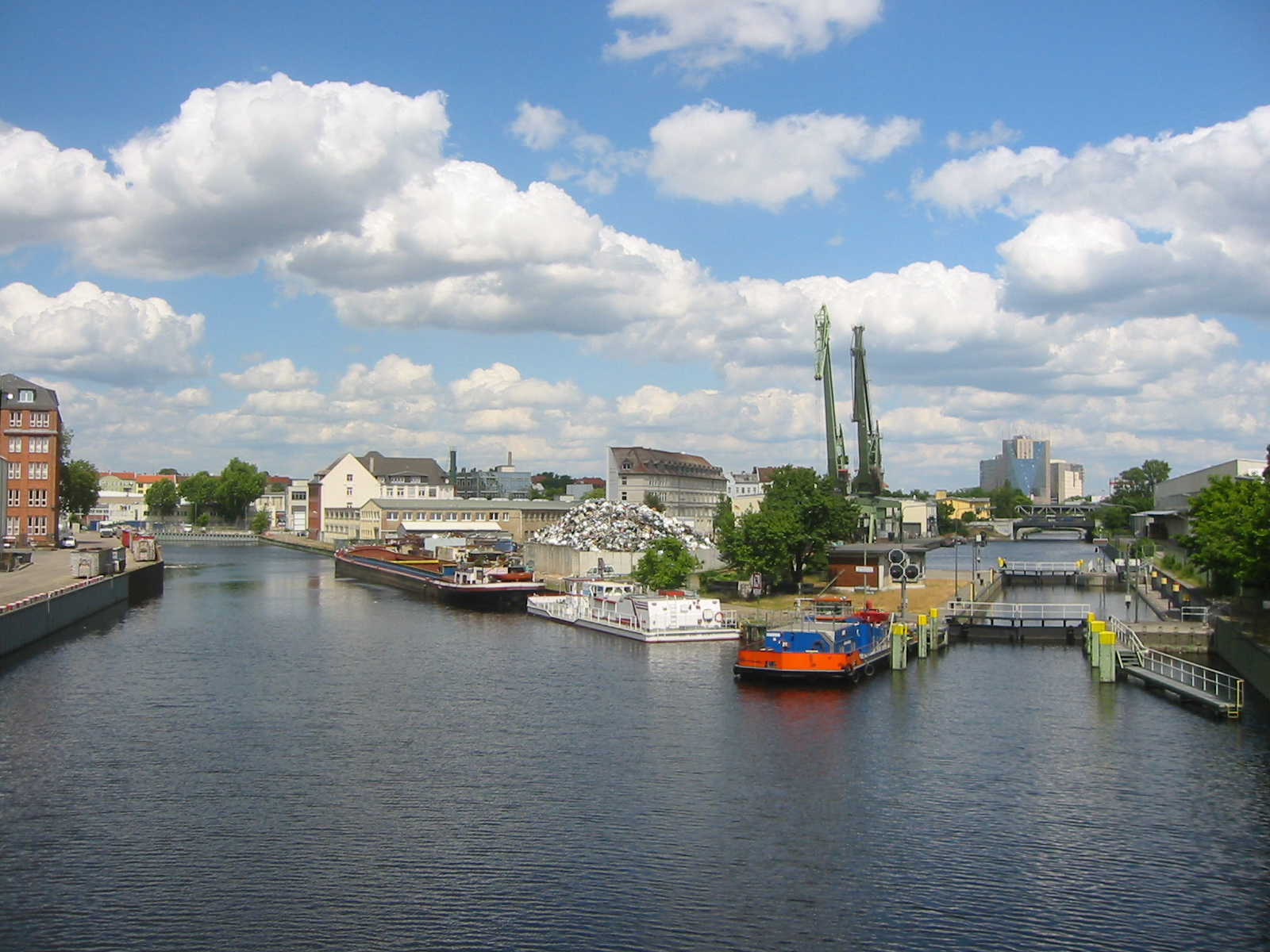
Neukölln Harbor and Watergate

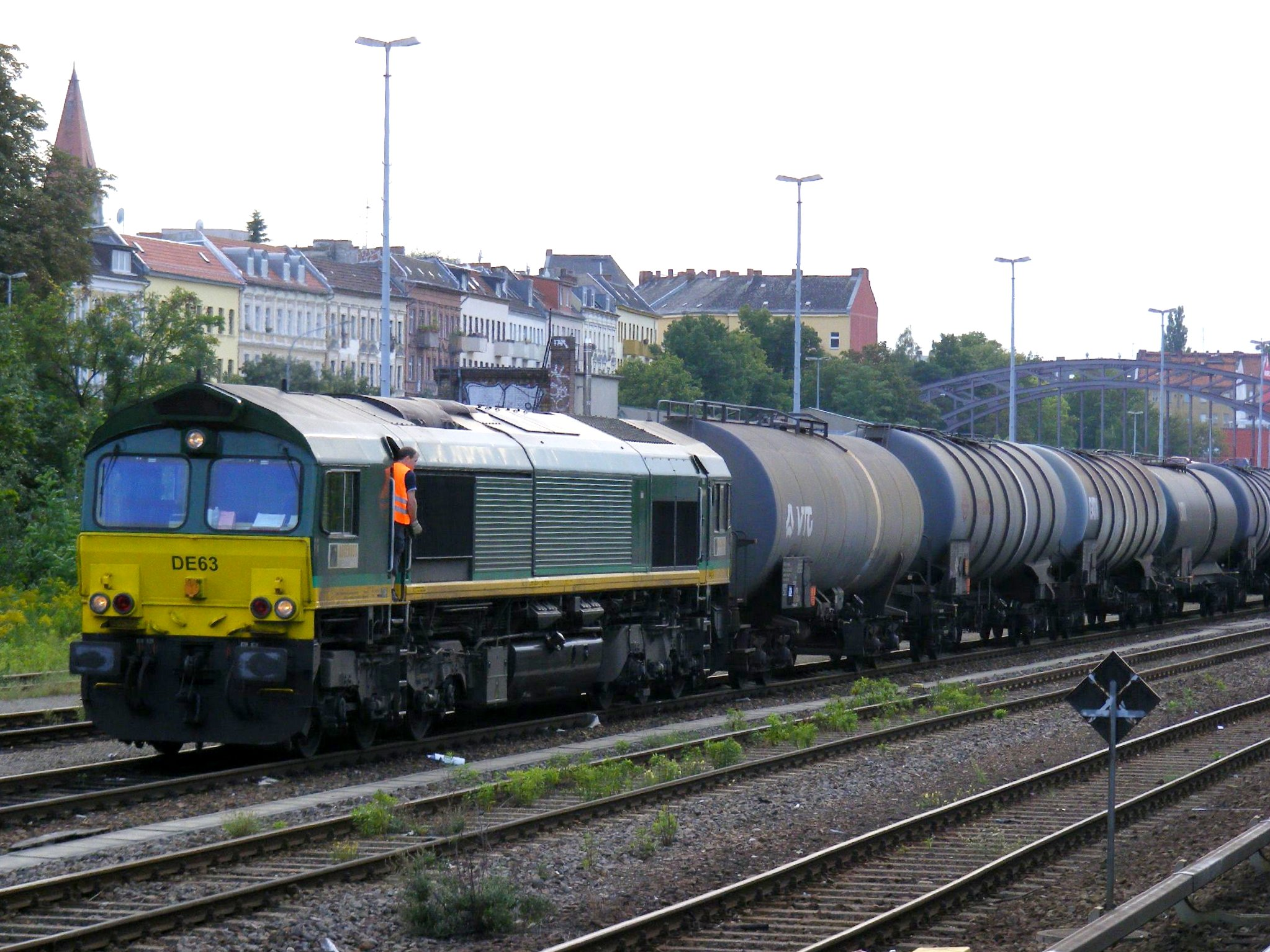
Freight yards, Neukölln station

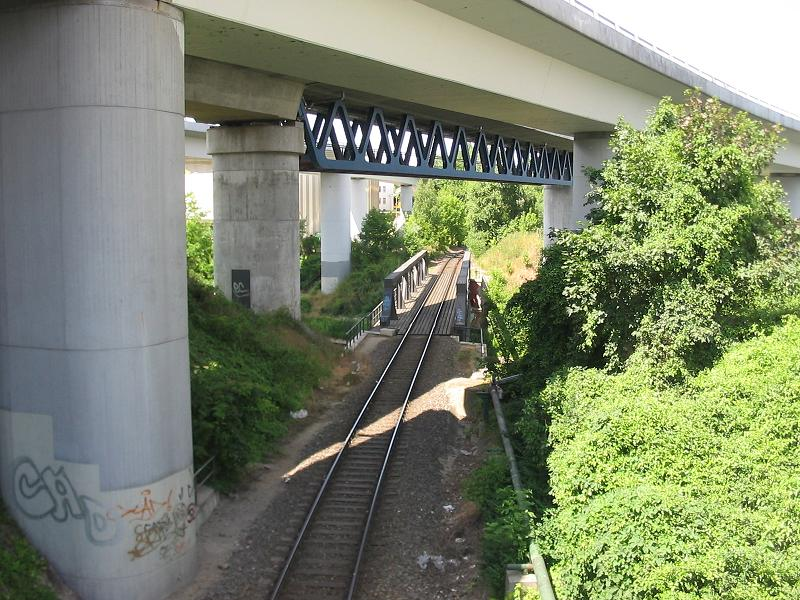
Neukölln–Mittenwald industrial railroad

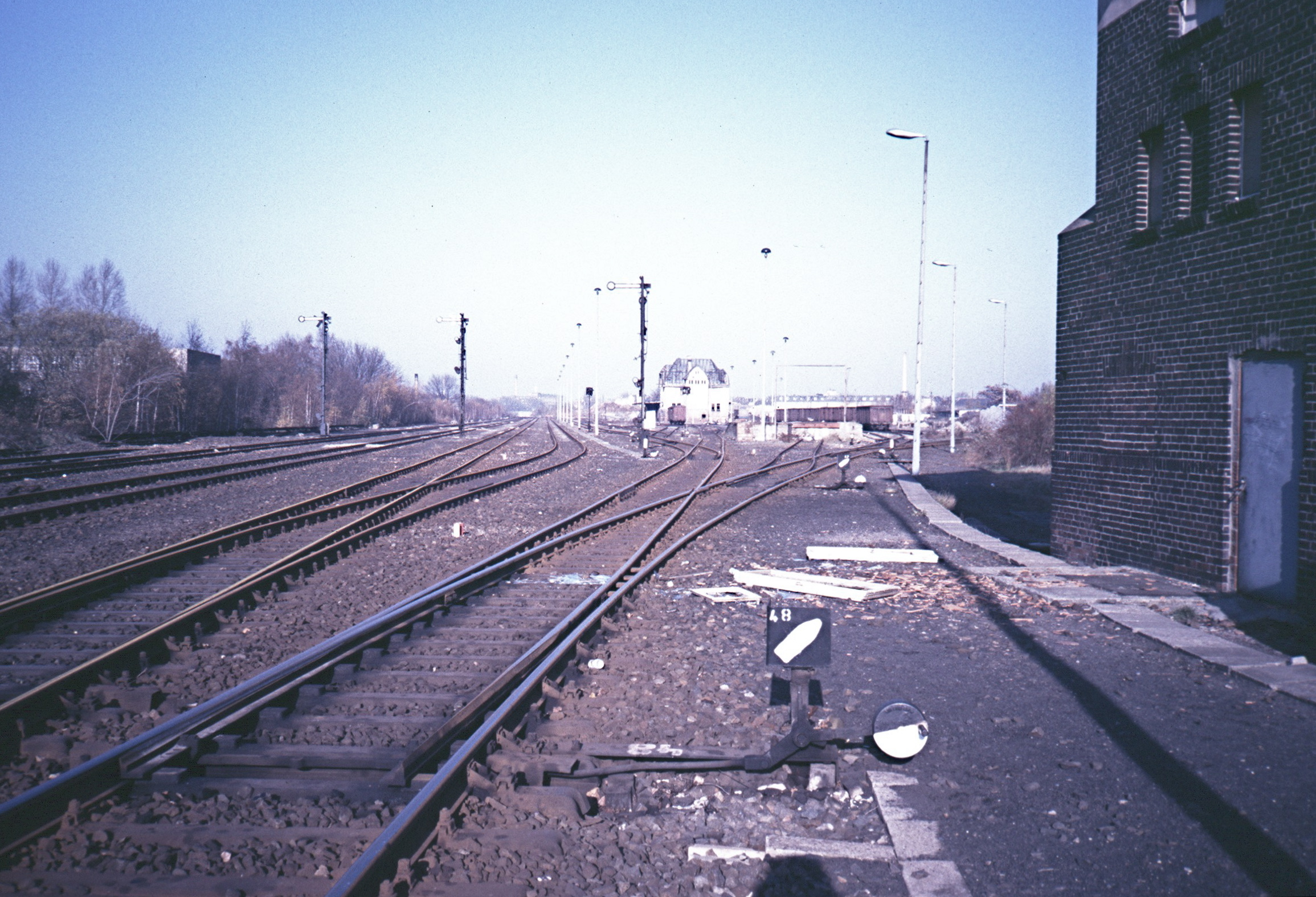
Treptow freight yards, Neukölln, 1986

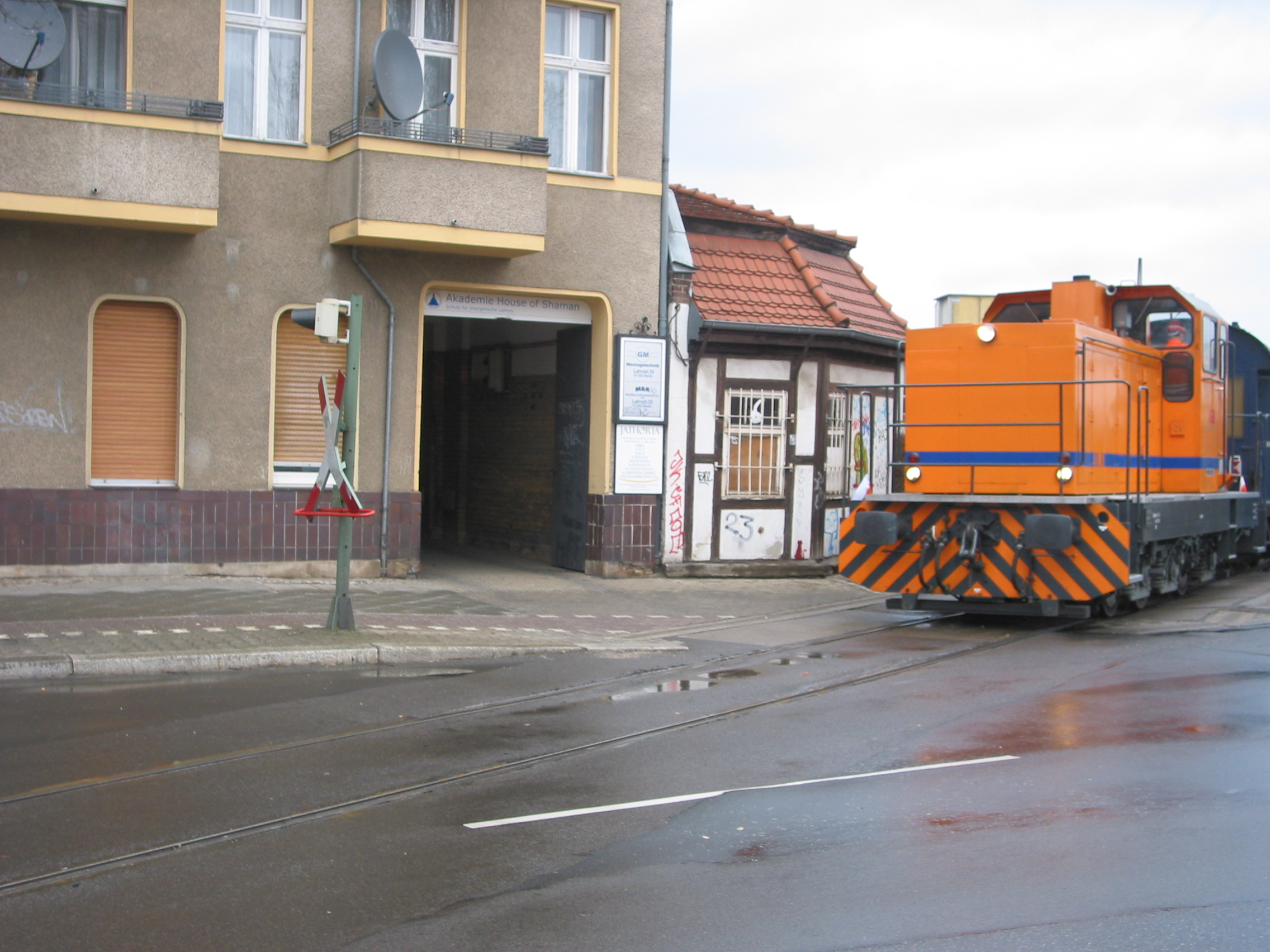
Industrial through track, Lahnstraße, Neukölln Harbor

All of Neukölln's industrial parks are situated in the southern and eastern parts of the quarter. Both the A100 and A113 highways function as vital access ways, not least for connecting to the BER airport's freight terminals. Especially the A113 exit and on-ramp to and from Grenzallee and Bergiusstraße respectively connect the autobahn directly to both the Neukölln Harbor area and the industrial park Nobelstraße.

The Neukölln Harbor itself, alongside Berlin's other waterways, also plays a prominent role in the transportation of goods, because all major canals of Berlin are part of the network of German Federal Waterways, which connects many German industrial regions, all important international maritime and inland ports, the North and Baltic Sea, and all of Germany's neighboring countries. The infrastructure of Neukölln's harbor sans railways (see below) is managed by the state-owned Berliner Hafen- und Lagerhausgesellschaft (BEHALA). The Neukölln Ship Canal, together with Neukölln Harbor and the Neukölln Watergate, is owned by the state of Berlin and managed by Neukölln's district office. All of Neukölln's other waterways, including many rivers and canals outside of the quarter and borough, are managed by the Neukölln branch of the federal Wasserstraßen- und Schifffahrtsamt Spree–Havel (Office of Spree–Havel Waterways and Shipping), which is situated in the eastern Britz docklands south of Neukölln Harbor.

Besides S-Bahn services, the stations Hermannstraße, Sonnenallee with its northern terminals along the western shore of the Neukölln Ship Canal into the freight terminus Güterbahnhof Treptow, and especially Neukölln offer additional capacities for freight traffic via railways. The main lines connect eastbound via Köllnische Heide and westbound alongside Berlin's orbital S-Bahn infrastructure, continuing either westbound via Südkreuz or southbound and southwestbound via Tempelhof.

A smaller and mainly single-track historical railroad, whose northern parts within Berlin are still in operation for industrial transport, is the Neukölln–Mittenwald railroad (NME). It originates at Berlin Hermannstraße freight station and branches off in the Tempelhof quarter south of the Tempelhofer Feld and traverses the Teltow Canal to connect other industrial areas in the south of Berlin, with the first (and primary) freight station Berlin Teltowkanal located in Tempelhof near Saalburgstraße south of the canal, which also services Neukölln's Britz quarter via auxiliary through tracks along Gradestraße. The railroad leads further south back into the Neukölln borough via the decommissioned station Berlin-Britz at Mohriner Allee and the non-operational terminal Berlin-Buckow at Kölner Damm, ending at the small dual-track freight yards Berlin-Rudow Nord west of Wutzkyallee. An adjacent secondary freight line is still in operation, the Rudow industrial through track (Industriestammgleis Rudow) east of Gropiusstadt, which branches off at the NME's Berlin-Rudow Nord yards and leads north-east via Zwickauer Damm and Stubenrauchstraße to a diesel fuel facility at the Teltow Canal near Massantebrücke.

Furthermore, industrial through tracks, which are managed by the Industriebahn Berlin, connect Neukölln station via the Treptow freight yards north of Sonnenallee to several industrial plants in the Neukölln quarter, which are mainly located within the industrial park Nobelstraße north of the Britz Canal near High-Deck-Siedlung. They connect through the eastern parts of the Neukölln Harbor, with several auxiliary tracks currently or permanently decommissioned. Due to Neukölln's dense urban development and its inner-city industrial areas, the quarter's freight trains always needed to be switched and shift directions several times.

== Future plans ==
=== U-Bahn ===
There are concrete medium-term plans to extend the U7 south beyond Rudow to directly connect the airport BER to Neukölln and the rest of Berlin via U-Bahn, adding a minimum of two and up to seven additional stations in between, with Schönefeld also functioning as an S-Bahn interchange. In 2024, two performance audits for the extension began, with the Berlin audit still under way, while the audit by the Schönefeld municipality ended with a positive result in April 2025. The planned extension will not open before 2035, and the U7 would then be the first of Berlin's U-Bahn lines to reach beyond the city's borders.

As Greater Berlin has been steadily growing since German reunification to now almost 4.8 million inhabitants, with extensive residential construction happening in Berlin's immediate surrounding regions, public transport extensions to the city's periphery are propagated frequently. With regard to Neukölln, an internal 2023 BVG feasibility study on long-term U-Bahn network expansion included a southbound extension of the U8 beyond Hermannstraße, terminating in the south of Buckow on the border to Brandenburg's Gartenstadt Großziethen, which would tilt southern Neukölln's modal share toward public transport, and away from private car use (see above).

=== S-Bahn ===
The second half of the 2040s will see the completion of the fourth and last phase of construction (BA 3B) for the planned S21, which currently operates only as a northern stump line, the shuttle S15 between Gesundbrunnen and Hauptbahnhof. The last phase will revive parts of the historical Südringspitzkehre railway connection between the western branch of Berlin's north–south lines and the Ringbahn through the Cherusker Park in the south of the Rote Insel. This "Cheruscan Bend" (Cheruskerkurve) will connect the stations Julius-Leber-Brücke and Südkreuz, providing a direct connection from Neukölln to Potsdamer Platz and Hauptbahnhof.

The borough administrations of Treptow-Köpenick and Neukölln have often pushed for an additional station on Berlin's Ringbahn, primarily at the Kiefholzstraße on the border of the two boroughs. However, the Berlin transport providers aim at one Ringbahn revolution every 60 minutes. Under this guideline, only one station can be added to the lines S41/42 for the whole of Berlin. The Kiefholzstraße therefore competes against four other proposed stations, one of them in Neukölln as well, namely Oderstraße at the south-eastern corner of the Tempelhofer Feld.

=== Bus and DRT ===
Two new MetroBus and ExpressBus lines are planned, the M94 to Friedrichsfelde-Ost via Treptow and Ostkreuz station, and the X77 from Hermannstraße to Marienfelde via Alt-Mariendorf.

Mainly two neighborhoods of Neukölln are insufficiently connected to the Berlin public transportation system, either because they were never developed (Schillerpromenade), or because the old and narrow streets prevent the establishment of bus lines (Alt-Rixdorf). Therefore, the Berlin Senate and the BVG plan to create a network of DRT bus lines (Rufbus) for large parts of Neukölln, from the western neighborhoods at the Tempelhofer Feld to the Sonnenallee in the east, covering Schillerpromenade, Flughafenstraße, Rollberg, Körnerpark and both Rixdorf neighborhoods.

=== Tram ===
Despite Rixdorf's and Neukölln's important role in the historical development of Berlin's tramway, the quarter currently has no connection to the city's modern MetroTram system. Due to the Teltow slopes and narrower streets in places like Flughafenstraße, only Neukölln's northern neighborhoods in the glacial valley are immediately suitable for tram expansion. A long-gestating plan proposes to extend Berlin's so-called "party tram" line M10 by the year 2031 from Kreuzberg (SO 36) through the Görlitzer Park and crossing the Landwehr Canal into Neukölln, with stations in the Reuterkiez planned at Framstraße, Pannierstraße and U Hermannplatz on Urbanstraße via Sonnenallee. This would create a direct public transport connection from Neukölln (Reuterkiez) to Kreuzberg, Friedrichshain, Prenzlauer Berg, Mitte, Moabit via Berlin Central Station, and Jungfernheide station in Charlottenburg-Nord.

To replace Neukölln's overstrained "ghetto bus" line M41, the Berlin Senate also has concrete plans to create a new tram line from Schöneweide S-Bahn station (or further east from Oberspree station) through Johannisthal along the Königsheide, part of the former Cölln Heath, through Baumschulenweg, Neukölln and Kreuzberg 61 along Sonnenallee and Urbanstraße via Hallesches Tor to Potsdamer Platz.

=== Maglev ===
The Berlin Senate's forthcoming mobility program for the year 2035 is expected to contain plans for urban transit maglev trains, with one line to connect Berlin's ICC and exhibition grounds with the BER airport. One already proposed potential route would lead along the A100 autobahn and through the southern parts of the Neukölln quarter. The proposal has been rejected with harsh criticism by public transport experts, who stated that the chances of this technology being used as part of Berlin's public transport network were slim. They emphasized that maglev trains would merely strengthen something that is already covered by the city's traditional public transport infrastructure, without increasing efficiency, and that the technology would neither provide the necessary last-mile and suburban extensions nor give more residents access to the city's existing network.
