= Oberspree station =

Railway station in Berlin, Germany

Oberspree
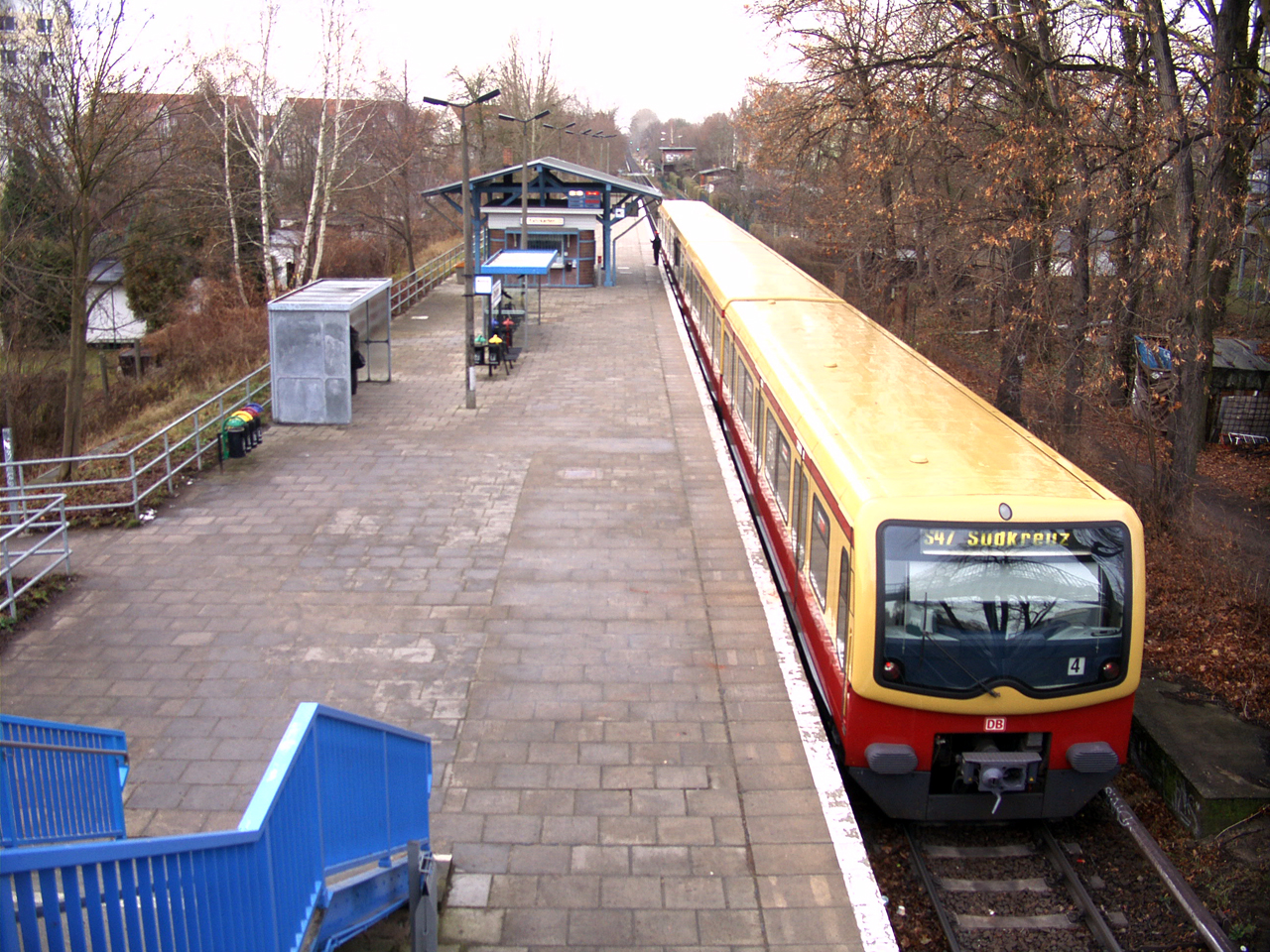
- Oberspree station: there used to be a second track along the left edge of the platform

General information
- Location: Treptow-Köpenick, Berlin, Berlin; Germany
- Coordinates: 52°27′09″N 13°32′18″E
- Owner: DB Netz
- Operator: DB Station&Service
- Lines: Schöneweide–Spindlersfeld branch line (KBS 200.47)
- Platforms: 1
- Tracks: 1
- Train operators: S-Bahn Berlin
- Connections: S47

Construction
- Accessible: Yes

Other information
- Station code: 4692
- DS100 code: BOSP
- Category: 6
- Fare zone: VBB: Berlin B/5656
- Website: www.bahnhof.de

History
- Opened: 1 April 1892

Services
Preceding station	Berlin S-Bahn	Following station
Schöneweide towards Hermannstraße	S47	Spindlersfeld Terminus
Location

Oberspree is a railway station in the Treptow-Köpenick district of Berlin on the Schöneweide–Spindlersfeld branch line. It is served by the S-Bahn line S47.

Oberspree station is located approximately halfway along the line where it crosses the Oberspreestraße. It was opened for passenger traffic on 1 April 1892. The station was initially built next to a railway crossing with a central platform. The station building was located on Bruno-Bürgel-Weg parallel with the line.

In 1970, the building was demolished. DRG closed the crossing loop in 1973 without publicising this fact and changed the status of a station at a halt (Haltepunkt in German, meaning a station without a set of points) after the crossing loop had not been used for several years. It was last used at the 10th World Festival of Youth and Students in 1973. Thus the impossibility of trains crossing each other meant that the 10-minute cycle of train services had to be abandoned. Crossing with delayed S-Bahn trains and with freight trains were made either in Schöneweide on the bridge over the Adlergestell or in Spindlersfeld, where track 9, which was intended primarily for freight traffic running to the sidings, was also equipped with conductor rail.

The crossing loop in Oberspree existed until September 1984, but the access points to it had been removed previously. In 1976, a road was built over it.

The most recent activity at the station was the building of new steel pedestrian bridge, which was completed in December 1997.

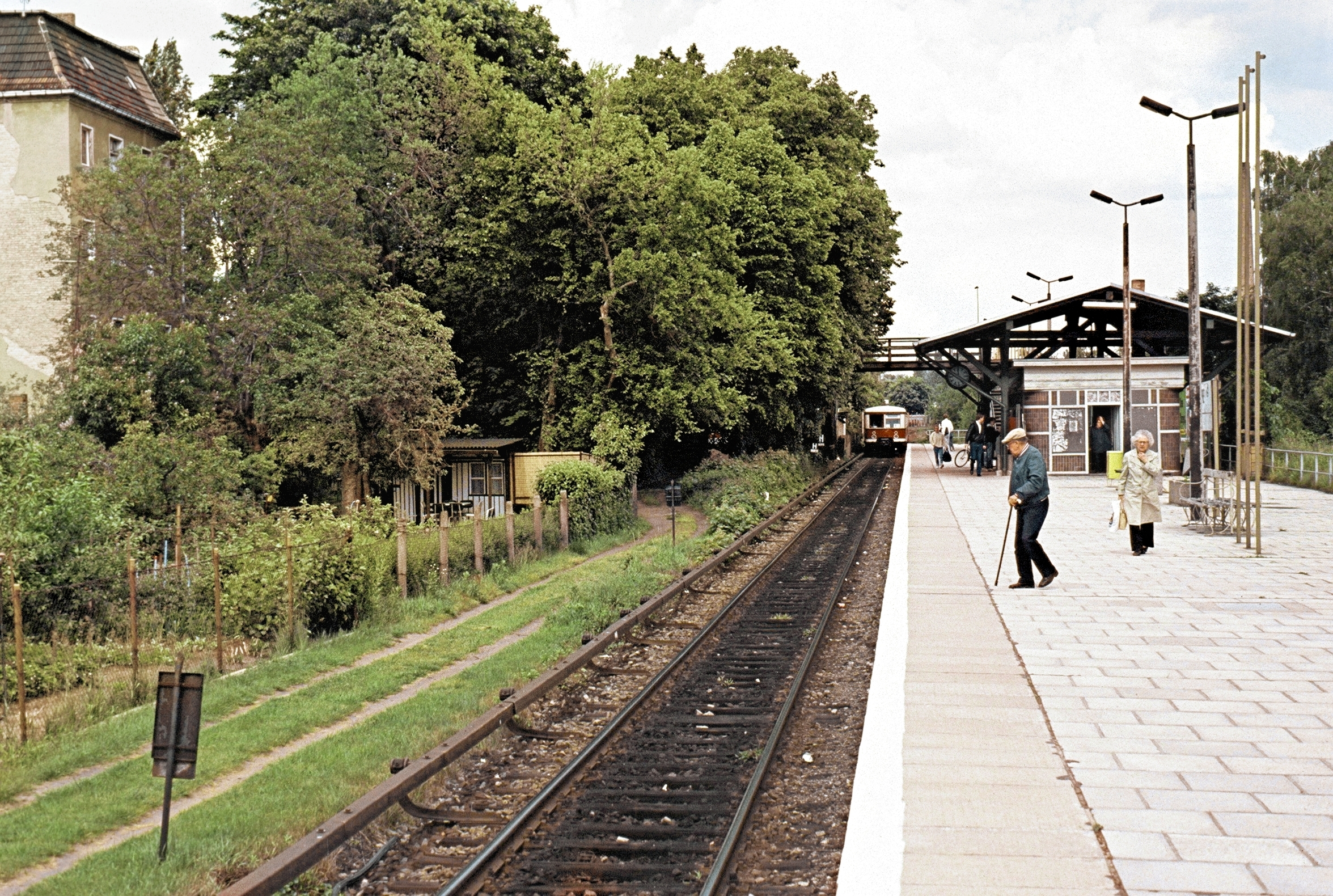
Oberspree station in 1991.
