= Schöneweide–Spindlersfeld branch line =

Railway line in Berlin, Germany

Schöneweide–Spindlersfeld

Overview
- Line number: 6143
- Locale: Berlin, Germany

Service
- Route number: 200.47

Technical
- Line length: 4.1 km (2.5 mi)
- Track gauge: 1,435 mm (4 ft 8 1/2 in) standard gauge
- Electrification: since 1929: 750 V; 1903–1906: 6 kV 25 Hz

The Schöneweide–Spindlersfeld branch line is a branch line of the Berlin–Görlitz railway, which is entirely in Berlin. The four kilometre long line runs from a junction next to Schöneweide station to two other stations and is served by the Berlin S-Bahn at 20-minute intervals.

== Route ==
The line begins at Schöneweide station (originally called Niederschöneweide-Johannisthal) and separates from the main line and turns to the east. Shortly after passing over Adlergestell (an arterial road), which begins here, the line connects to the former Berlin-Schöneweide repair shop of the Deutsche Reichsbahn (German: Reichsbahnausbesserungswerk Berlin-Schöneweide, RAW Schöneweide), now the main workshop of the Berlin S-Bahn. The line descends to ground level and passes over a level crossing over Oberspreestraße (street) to reach Oberspree station. Shortly after the station it curves slightly to the right and runs for half a kilometre straight ahead. After a further right turn it runs under the Berlin outer ring to its terminus at Spindlersfeld station.

== History ==
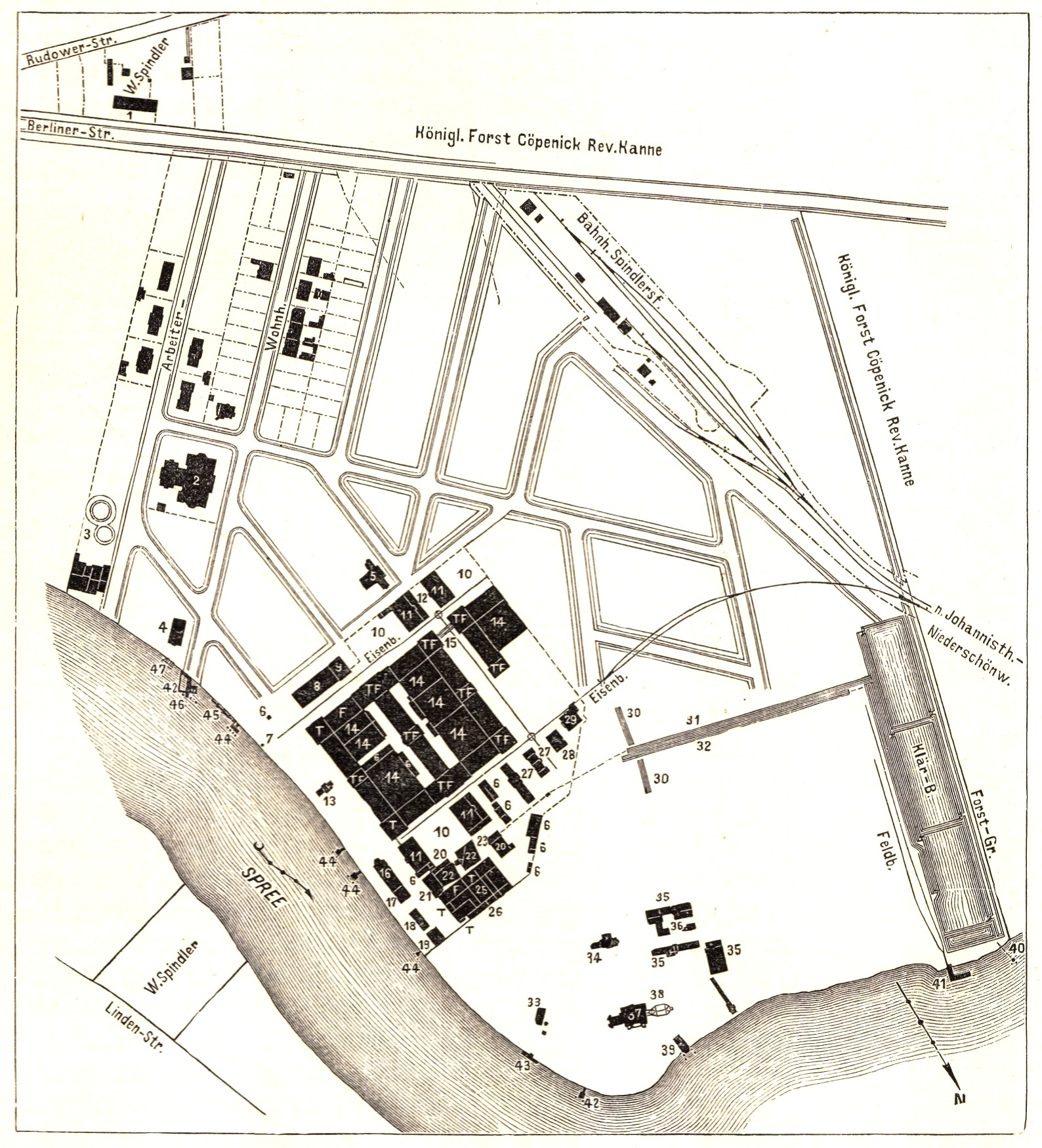
Location of the factory and Spindlersfeld station (top right) in 1896

The mostly single-track line along with its two stations was released for passenger operations on 1 April 1892. From 15 November 1891, the line had been used for freight to and from the factory of W. Spindler (a dye works and laundry), after which the entire surrounding area is named. In addition to the delivery of products, the line was used for supplies to the factory, especially coal. It also carried workers, similar to the Siemens Railway, which was built in the late 1920s in north-western Berlin. The railway was designed by two brothers, William and Carl Spindler, the sons of the founder.

In 1906, the line to Gorlitz railway was raised on an embankment, with the junction to the branch line rebuilt as a flying junction. The branch line was also raised until shortly west of Oberspreestraße and the line has grade-separated crossings of the other streets (Adlergestell and Hartriegelstraße).

On 15 October 1927, another branch from the route was completed, which leads to the then newly constructed RAW Schöneweide. The depot has been used since the 1950s as the main workshop for the S-Bahn, the U-Bahn and the tram network.

=== Electrical test operations 1903–1906 ===
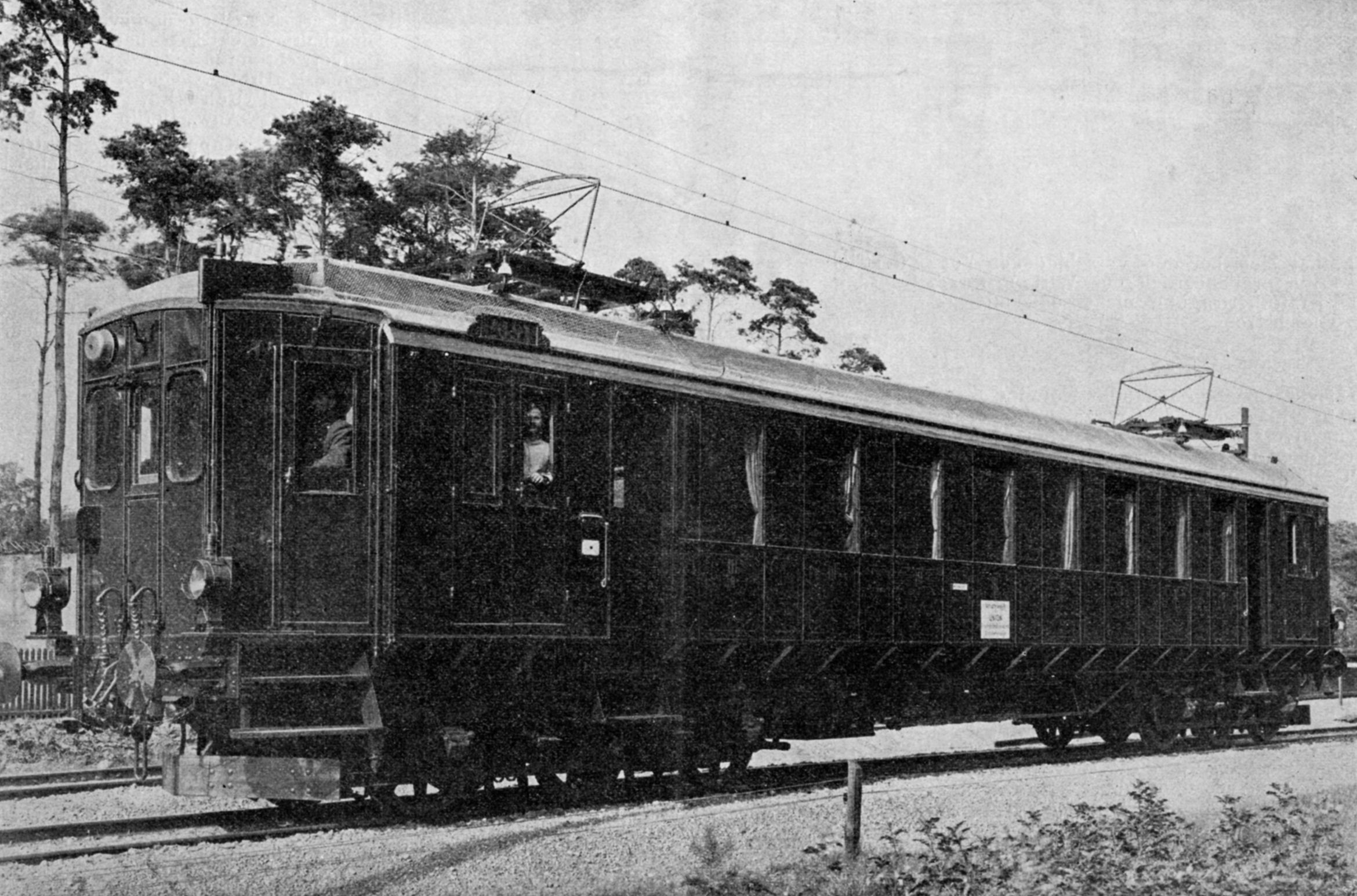
UEG electric test vehicle for the runs between Schöneweide and Spindlersfeld

From 15 August 1903, overhead electrification with AC power (6 kV, 25 Hz) was tested on the line by the company Union-Elektricitäts-Gesellschaft (UEG), which merged the following year with AEG. During these tests numerous approaches were tried to determine the best way of applying electrical equipment to railways. The trials ended on 1 March 1906.

Parallel with the trials on the Spindlersfeld line, tests were carried out by AEG and Siemens & Halske, under a joint venture called Studiengesellschaft für Elektrische Schnellbahnen, with AC on the Royal Prussian Military Railway (Königlich Preußische Militär-Eisenbahn) between Marienfelde and Zossen.

Although brief, the tests carried out between Niederschöneweide-Johannisthal and Spindlersfeld were an important milestone in the development of the DC power system at relatively low voltage, which was now preferred to high voltage single-phase AC. An immediate practical application of the AC test system in 1907 was on the Altona–Blankenese line of the Hamburg-Altona City and Suburban Railway (Hamburg-Altonaer Stadt- und Vorortbahn), later to develop into the Hamburg S-Bahn.

=== Becoming part of the Berlin S-Bahn network ===
On 1 February 1929, the line was part of the second phase of the introduction of electrical operations. This time it was electrified using a third rail mounted on the side of the track, with the conductor on the underside of the conductor rail and using 750 V dc, which is still the electrical system used by the Berlin S-Bahn. The trains were operated on working days as traction group F (called Friedrich), running via the northern Ringbahn and the Berlin Stadtbahn to Friedrichshagen.

The Germania plan of the Nazis did not provide for an extension of the stub line past Schöneweide. An underground extension of the branch from Spindlersfeld to a station in Köpenick was, however, mentioned, but the proposal never progressed beyond the planning stage.

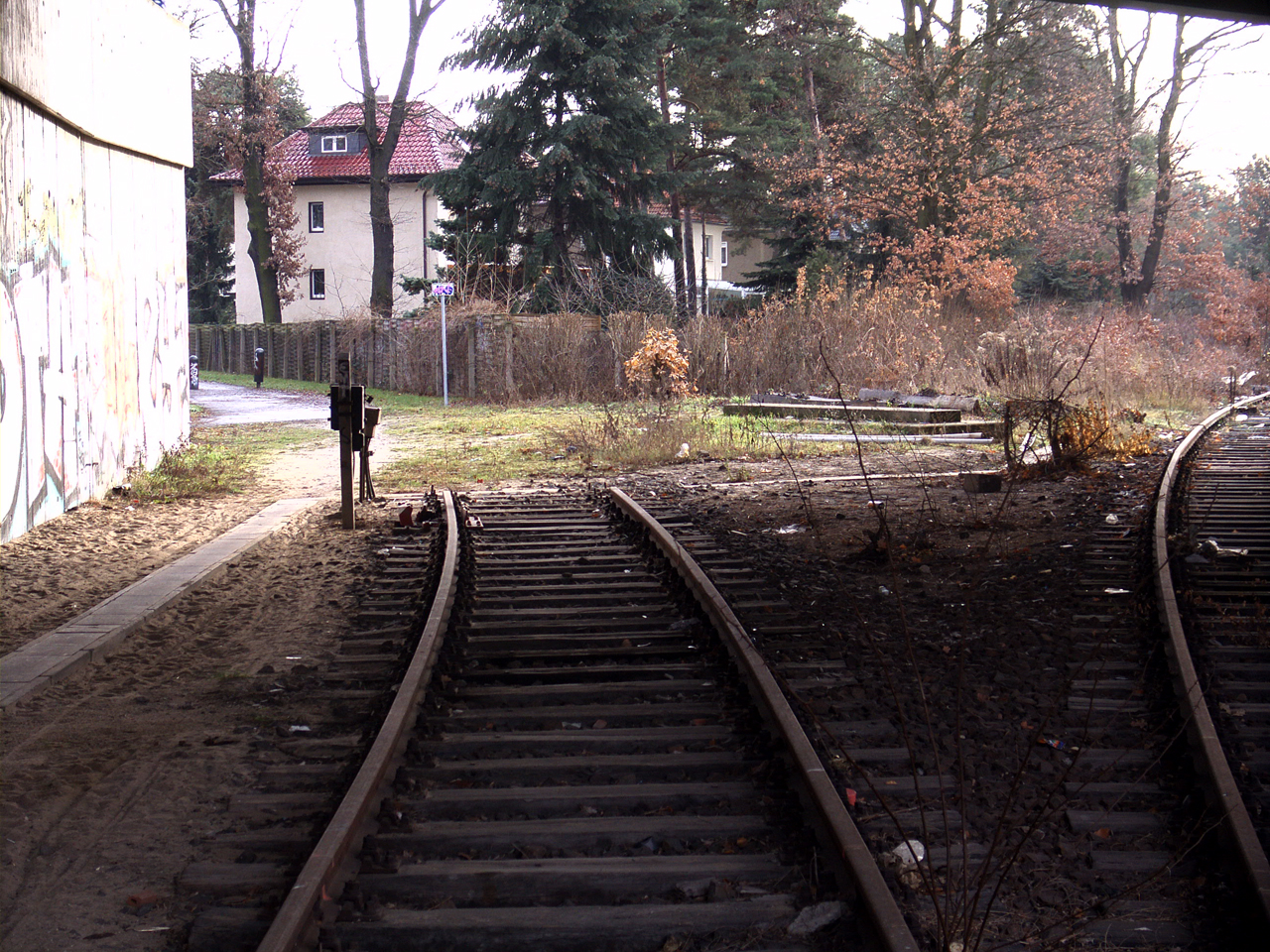
The former branch line to Spindler factory is now a foot and cycle path

In the Second World War the line was only slightly damaged, and it took only three months to put it back into operation even in 1945. In December of that year, the first casualty to occur on the S-Bahn since the war was recorded on the line. On the single-track bridge over the Adlergestell, a local freight train and an S-Bahn train collided head on and there were four dead and several seriously injured. The dispatcher, who was responsible for the section and had caused the accident by human error, was sentenced to death by the Soviet occupation forces. His subsequent life after the verdict, however, remains unclear.

=== Post-war period ===
From 1952 trains continued past Schöneweide again: they operated as traction group N (called Nordpol, that is North Pole) via the northern Ringbahn to Spandau West.

In 1956/1957 the overbridge was built over the Adlergestell in order for the line could be duplicated. The new infrastructure was built of steel; the track itself was duplicated as far as the branch to RAW Schöneweide. Trains to and from the railway repair shop or to Spindlersfeld would no longer block each other and conflicts such as that which led to the accident of 15 December 1945 would be avoided.

After the construction of the Berlin Wall in 1961, the service to and from Spindlersfeld was changed again. The traction group was originally cut back to run to Schönhauser Allee and after the completion of a separate pair of tracks on the curve to Pankow the service was extended to Blankenburg.

=== The "Mini-Otto" ===
From 31 January 1976, the so-called Mini-Otto sets operated on the line. The "mini" referred to the length of the train set, a two-carriage set (Viertelzug, literally “quarter train”) and Otto was the radio call sign for traction group O. The train group name was changed because the operations of the old traction group N (Nordpol) was now confined to the section of its former route that was in West Berlin. To avoid confusion, Deutsche Reichsbahn (DRG) designated the operations on the East Berlin section of the route as traction group O.

Normally, the Berlin S-Bahn operated Halbzüge (“half trains”, four-carriage sets, for example, ET+EB+EB+ET) and, by the end of the war, DRG had rebuilt all former driving carriages (ES) into trailer carriages (EB). The materials from the former cabs were used to build other motor carriages (ET). After 1945, however, some units were restored as two-carriage sets of motor and driving carriages (ET + ES). In addition, in 1952, the S-Bahn took over two-carriage sets (ET + ES) from the railway workshop of the Peenemünde Army Research Center. These were called Peenemünder Viertel (Peenemünde quarter sets) in Berlin.

Crucial for use with two-carriage sets was the increasing population in the northern district of Berlin, Buch. To accommodate the growing population, DRG restored the second track to Karow station, which had been removed un 1945 as war reparations to the Soviet Union, in order to allow trains to run at 10-minute intervals. A new traction group L (called Ludwig) was established to run between Buch and Alexanderplatz. Traction group Otto was cut back to operate on weekdays between Blankenburg and Spindlersfeld.

On the weekend, Ludwig services, however, ran between Buch and Schöneweide, while Otto services shuttled between Schöneweide and Spindlersfeld. Until the extension of the 10-minute cycle over the weekend, trains ran through from Buch to Spindlersfeld, under the traction group name of Schöneweide. The introduction of the new timetable, however, revealed unfavourable arrival and departure times towards Spindlersfeld. The operations were therefore separated again, and the branch line was served by its own shuttles. Since the traffic on the route is fairly sparse, the use of two-carriage sets was ideal. Thus the mini-Otto services came to be operated by two Peenemünde quarter sets. At times of high patronage or if one of the two trains failed, four-carriage sets from Grünau depot were used.

Mini-Otto services ended after ten years on 31 May 1986.

=== After the reunification of Berlin ===
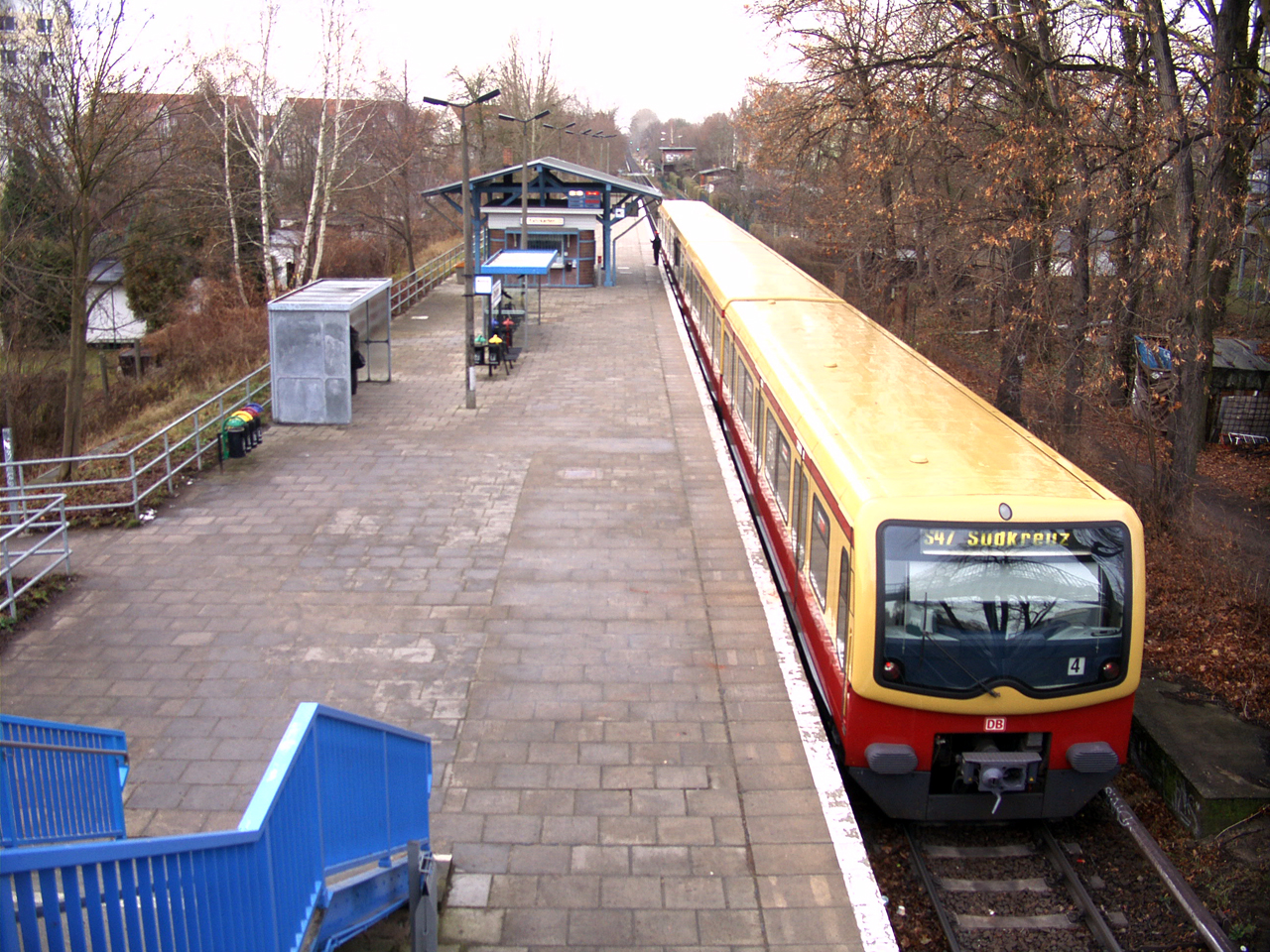
Oberspree station: there used to be a second track along the left edge of the platform

Until the mid-1990s, freight trains operated to Spindlersfeld, after which both equipment for handling freight and the siding to Schöneweide were removed. The siding on the former W. Spindler laundry was converted into a bike path.

The S-Bahn bridge over Hartriegelstraße is the last bridge supported by Hartung's columns (cast iron columns that were designed by Hugo Hartung (1855–1932) and installed widely in the S-Bahn between 1880 and 1910) that continues (as of October 2010) to be used by S-Bahn trains. In 1992, the bridge and the pillars were given a new coat of paint. The cast-iron stabilisers were secured against heavy collisions with road traffic. Unfortunately, the horizontal facings of the capitals of these columns were no longer available.

Currently, S-Bahn line S 47 operates from Hermannstraße. According to plans of the Senate of Berlin the line will be duplicated, in order to allow the service to operate at 10-minute intervals. The date for the duplication has been postponed several times, however, so that work is not expected to start before 2015.

== Stations ==
=== Oberspree ===
Oberspree station is located approximately halfway along the line where it crosses the Oberspreestraße. It was opened for passenger traffic on 1 April 1892. The station was initially built next to a railway crossing with a central platform. The station building was located on Bruno-Bürgel-Weg parallel with the line.

In 1970, the building was demolished. DRG closed the crossing loop in 1973 without publicising this fact and changed the status of a station at a halt (Haltepunkt in German, meaning a station without a set of points) after the crossing loop had not been used for several years. It was last used at the 10th World Festival of Youth and Students in 1973. Thus the impossibility of trains crossing each other meant that the 10-minute cycle of train services had to be abandoned. Crossing with delayed S-Bahn trains and with freight trains were made either in Schöneweide on the bridge over the Adlergestell or in Spindlersfeld, where track 9, which was intended primarily for freight traffic running to the sidings, was also equipped with conductor rail.

The crossing loop in Oberspree existed until September 1984, but the access points to it had been removed previously. In 1976, a road was built over it.

The most recent activity at the station was the building of new steel pedestrian bridge, which was completed in December 1997.

=== Spindlersfeld ===
Spindlersfeld station with a line S47 train

The terminus at Spindlersfeld is located at the corner of Oberspreestraße and Ernst-Grube-Straße. In addition to the platform for the S-Bahn, there were on one side a loading ramp at the freight shed and a loading road. On the other side, there was a loading facility for VEB Müllabfuhr (the state waste-disposal company). The city of Berlin later closed the garbage loading siding. There were sidings for VEB Rewatex (a new name for the nationalised W. Spindler Company) and from the late 1980s for VEB Dampfkesselbau, later called VEB Behälterbau.

In 1983, DRG ripped up the southern of the two loading ramps and replaced it with four new freight tracks. In 1988, as part of rationalisation measures, interlocking “Spf” was closed and its supervision was taken over by the signal room at the station as part of an electro-mechanical system. The old semaphore signals were replaced by colour light signals. This was followed after Die Wende (the changes accompanying German reunification) by the removal of the freight facilities and the Rewatex siding. Today, apart from some fragments of the tracks in the ground, few signs of the past importance of the freight infrastructure remain.

In 2006, the platform was moved to Oberspreestraße, shortening the route for passengers transferring between the S-Bahn and trams to Köpenick or Adlershof. The old entrance to Ernst-Grube-Strasse has been maintained. A two-track development of the station, however, is not in sight; even if the proposed duplication of the whole line goes ahead, the terminus will still have only one track.
