= Berlin-Spindlersfeld station =

Railway station in Berlin, Germany

Berlin Spindlersfeld
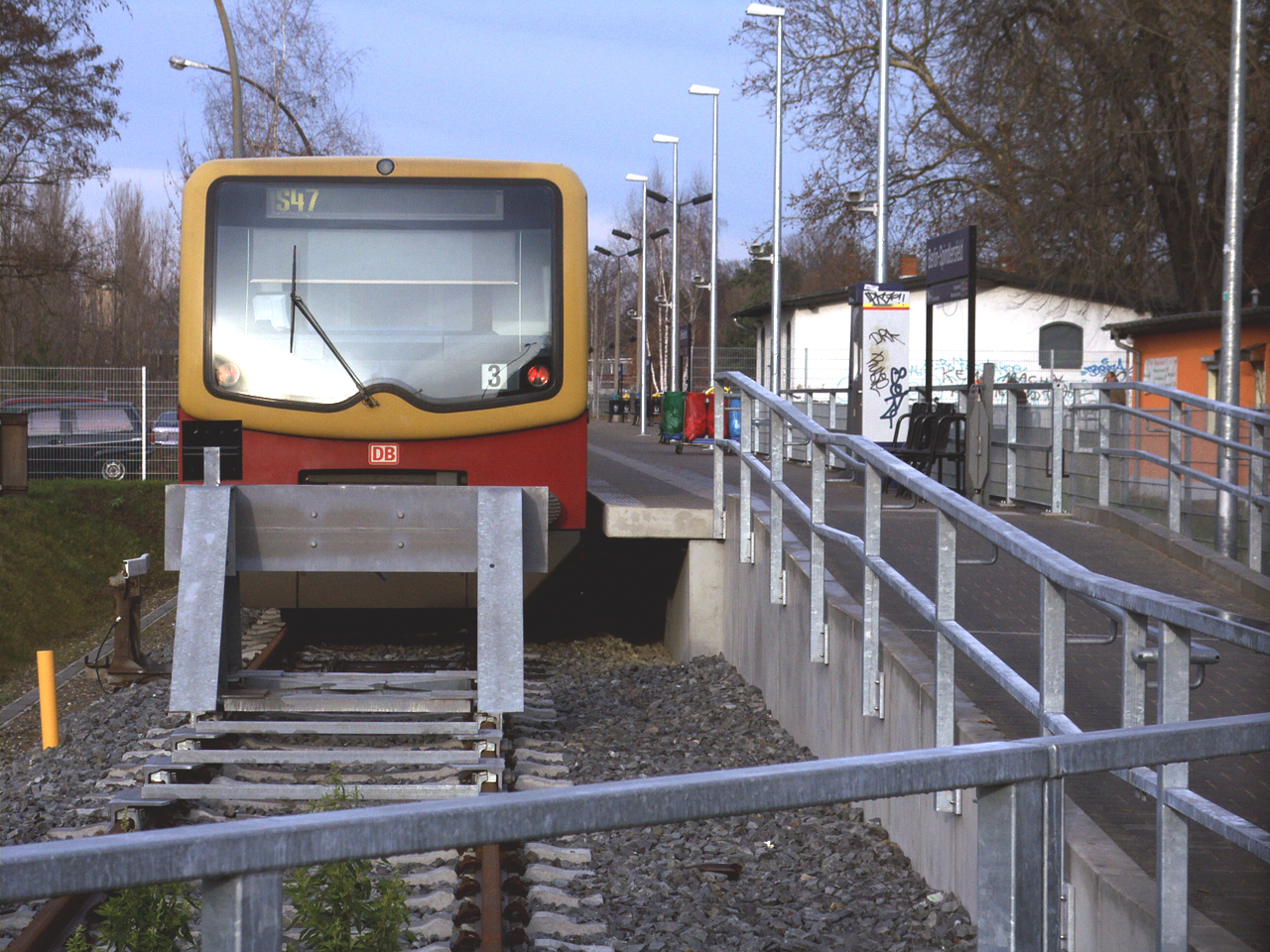
- Spindlersfeld station with a line S 47 train

General information
- Location: Treptow-Köpenick, Berlin, Berlin; Germany
- Coordinates: 52°26′50″N 13°33′41″E
- Owner: DB Netz
- Operator: DB Station&Service
- Lines: Schöneweide–Spindlersfeld branch line (KBS 200.47)
- Platforms: 1
- Tracks: 1
- Train operators: S-Bahn Berlin
- Connections: S47

Construction
- Accessible: Yes

Other information
- Station code: 563
- DS100 code: BSPF
- Category: 5
- Fare zone: VBB: Berlin B/5656
- Website: www.bahnhof.de

History
- Opened: 1 April 1892

Services
Preceding station	Berlin S-Bahn	Following station
Oberspree towards Hermannstraße	S47	Terminus
Location

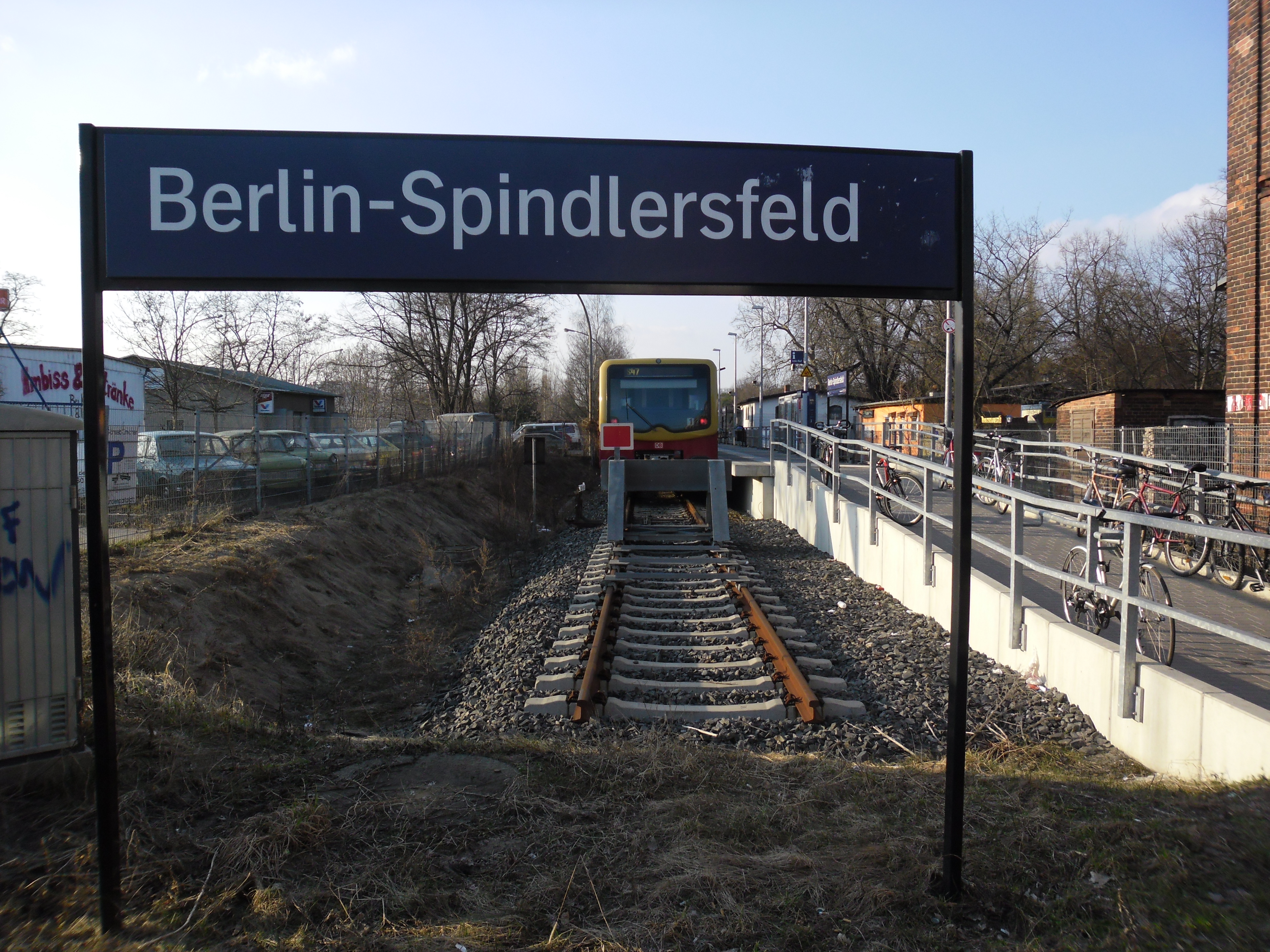
Spindlersfeld station in 2011

Spindlersfeld is a railway station in the Treptow-Köpenick district of Berlin on the Schöneweide–Spindlersfeld branch line. It is the eastern terminus of the S-Bahn line S47. It is located at the corner of Oberspreestraße and Ernst-Grube-Straße.

A two-track development of the station is not in sight; even if the proposed duplication of the whole line goes ahead, the terminus will still have only one track.

== Description ==
The station is situated some 1 kilometre (0.62 mi) west of the Altstadt of Köpenick, and is also served by routes 61 and 63 of the Berlin tram network, both of which also serve the Altstadt.

== History ==
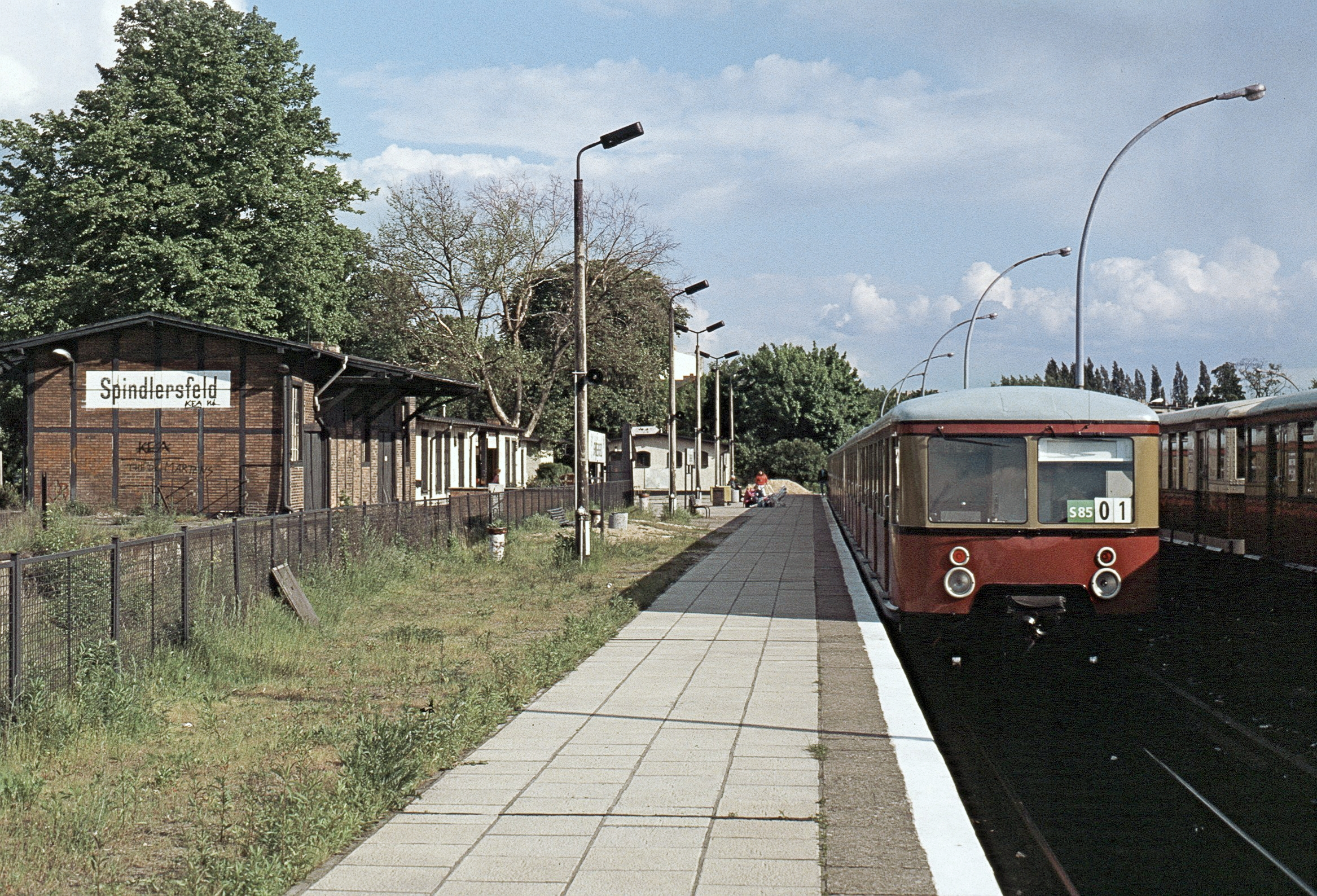
Spindlersfeld station in 1991.

In addition to the platform for the S-Bahn, there were on one side a loading ramp at the freight shed and a loading road. On the other side, there was a loading facility for VEB Müllabfuhr (the state waste-disposal company). The city of Berlin later closed the garbage loading siding. There were sidings for VEB Rewatex (a new name for the nationalised W. Spindler Company) and from the late 1980s for VEB Dampfkesselbau, later called VEB Behälterbau.

In 1983, DRG ripped up the southern of the two loading ramps and replaced it with four new freight tracks. In 1988, as part of rationalisation measures, interlocking “Spf” was closed and its supervision was taken over by the signal room at the station as part of an electro-mechanical system. The old semaphore signals were replaced by colour light signals. This was followed after Die Wende (the changes accompanying German reunification) by the removal of the freight facilities and the Rewatex siding. Today, apart from some fragments of the tracks in the ground, few signs of the past importance of the freight infrastructure remain.

In 2006, the platform was moved to Oberspreestraße, shortening the route for passengers transferring between the S-Bahn and trams to Köpenick or Adlershof. The old entrance to Ernst-Grube-Strasse has been maintained.
