= S47 (Berlin) =

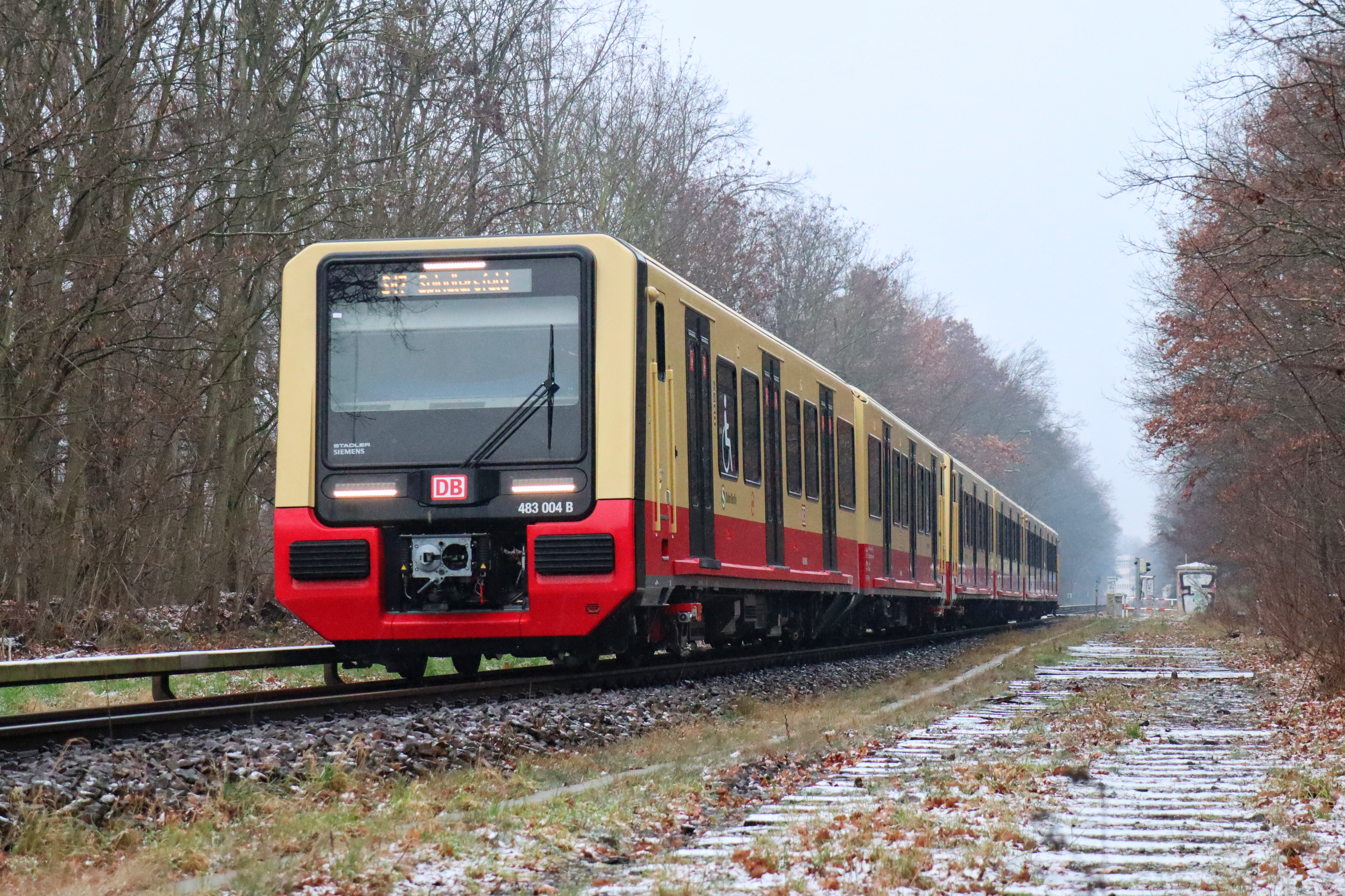

Overview
- Locale: Berlin

Service
- System: Berlin S-Bahn
- Operator(s): S-Bahn Berlin GmbH
- Rolling stock: DBAG Class 483; DBAG Class 484

Technical
- Electrification: 750 V DC Third rail

The Berlin S-Bahn line 47 (S47) runs from Spindlersfeld to Südkreuz. The line has been extended to Südkreuz as of 14 December 2025.

It operates over:

- the Schöneweide–Spindlersfeld branch line, opened on 1 April 1892 and electrified on 1 February 1929,
- the Görlitz line, opened in 1866 and electrified in 1929,
- the Baumschulenweg–Neukölln link line, opened on 8 June 1896 and electrified in 1928 and
- the Ring line, completed in 1877 and electrified in 1926.

Until the 28 May 2006, the line ran from Spindlersfeld to Gesundbrunnen. The line was shortened to Südkreuz to allow frequency improvements to the S41 and S42 ring lines. The line was shortened on December 11, 2011, to Hermannstraße, until on the 14th of December 2025, it resumed service to Südkreuz. The line now contains nine stations.
