= Priort station =

Railway station in Germany

Priort
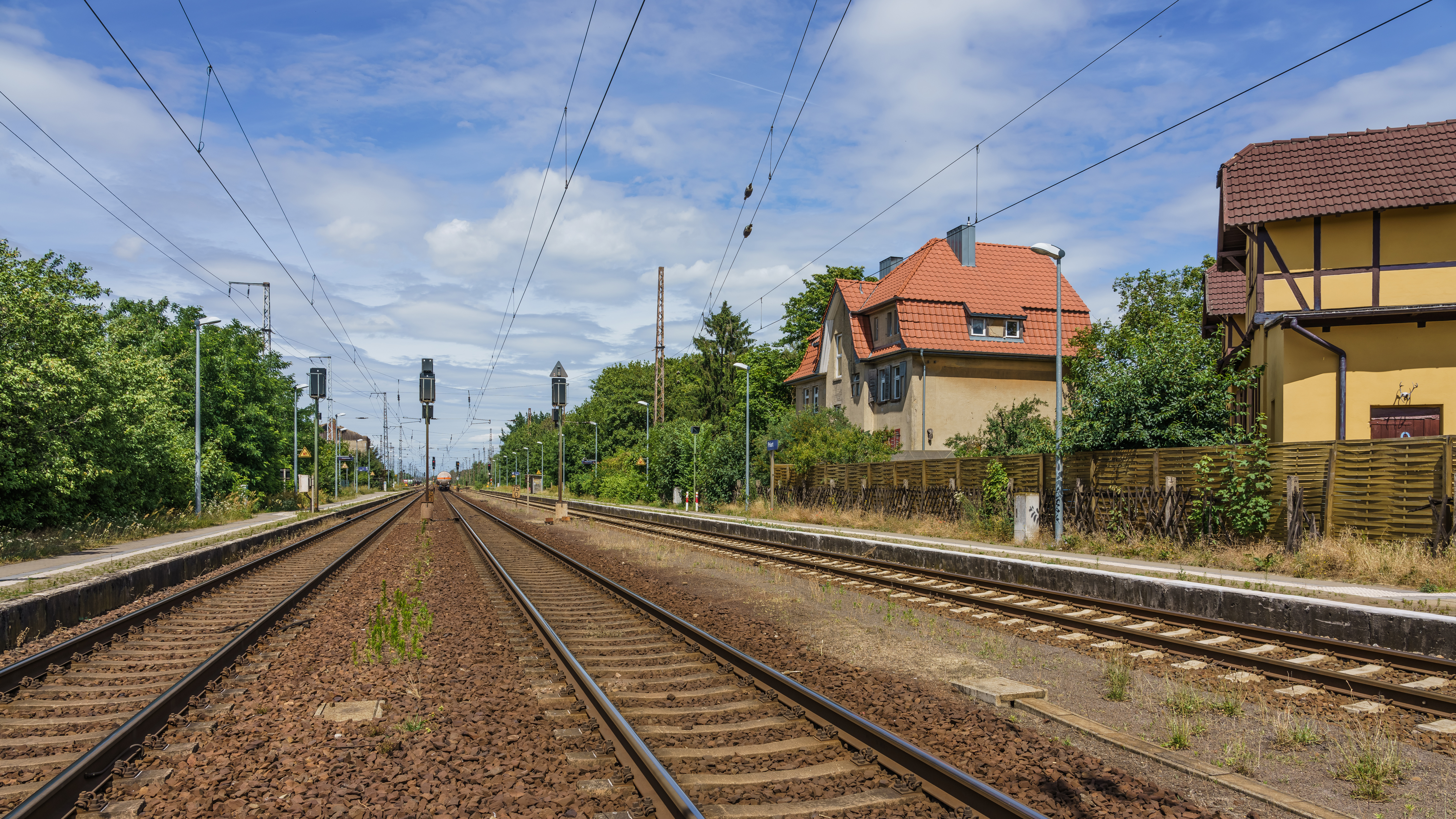
- 2019

General information
- Location: Straße am Bahnhof 1; 14641 Priort (Wustermark); Brandenburg; Germany
- Coordinates: 52.516294°N 12.971370°E
- System: Bf
- Owner: DB Netz
- Operator: DB Station&Service
- Lines: Berlin outer ring Jüterbog–Nauen railway
- Train operators: DB Regio Nordost

Other information
- Station code: 5038
- DS100 code: BPOT
- IBNR: 8013489
- Category: 6
- Fare zone: VBB: Berlin C and Potsdam C/5549
- Website: www.bahnhof.de

History
- Opened: 1 September 1902; 124 years ago

Services
Preceding station	DB Regio Nordost	Following station
Wustermark towards Potsdam Hbf	RB 21	Marquardt towards Berlin Gesundbrunnen
Location
- Location within Brandenburg Location within Germany Location within Europe

Priort station is a railway station in Priort, district of the municipality Wustermark located in the Havelland district, Brandenburg, Germany.

The pedestrian bridge in the middle of the station was demolished on 13 November 2011.
