= Michendorf–Großbeeren railway =

Railway line in Germany

Michendorf–Saarmund–(Großbeeren) railway
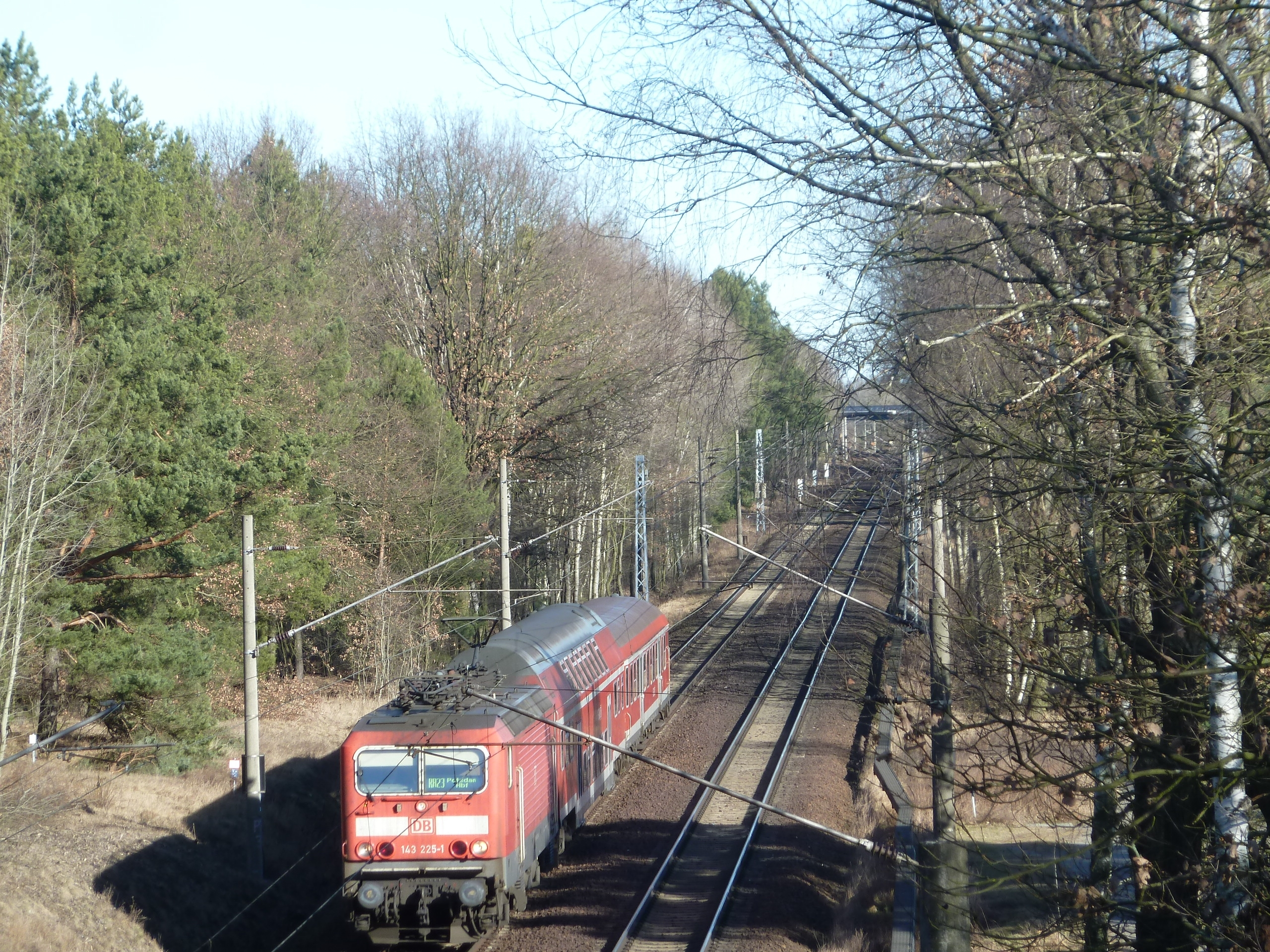
- Line between Michendorf and Saarmund

Overview
- Line number: 6117 Michendorf–Saarmund; 6126 Saarmund–Genshagener Heide; 6127 Genshagener Heide–Großbeeren
- Locale: Brandenburg, Germany

Technical
- Line length: 20.3 km (12.6 mi)
- Track gauge: 1,435 mm (4 ft 8 1/2 in) standard gauge
- Electrification: 15 kV/16.7 Hz AC overhead catenary

The Michendorf–Großbeeren railway is an electrified main line railway in the German state of Brandenburg south of Berlin. It went into operation in 1926 and was originally a section of the Brandenburg Bypass Railway, which was built to remove freight traffic from the railways through Berlin. The section between Saarmund and Genshagener Heide has been included in the Berlin Outer Ring since the 1950s.

== Route ==
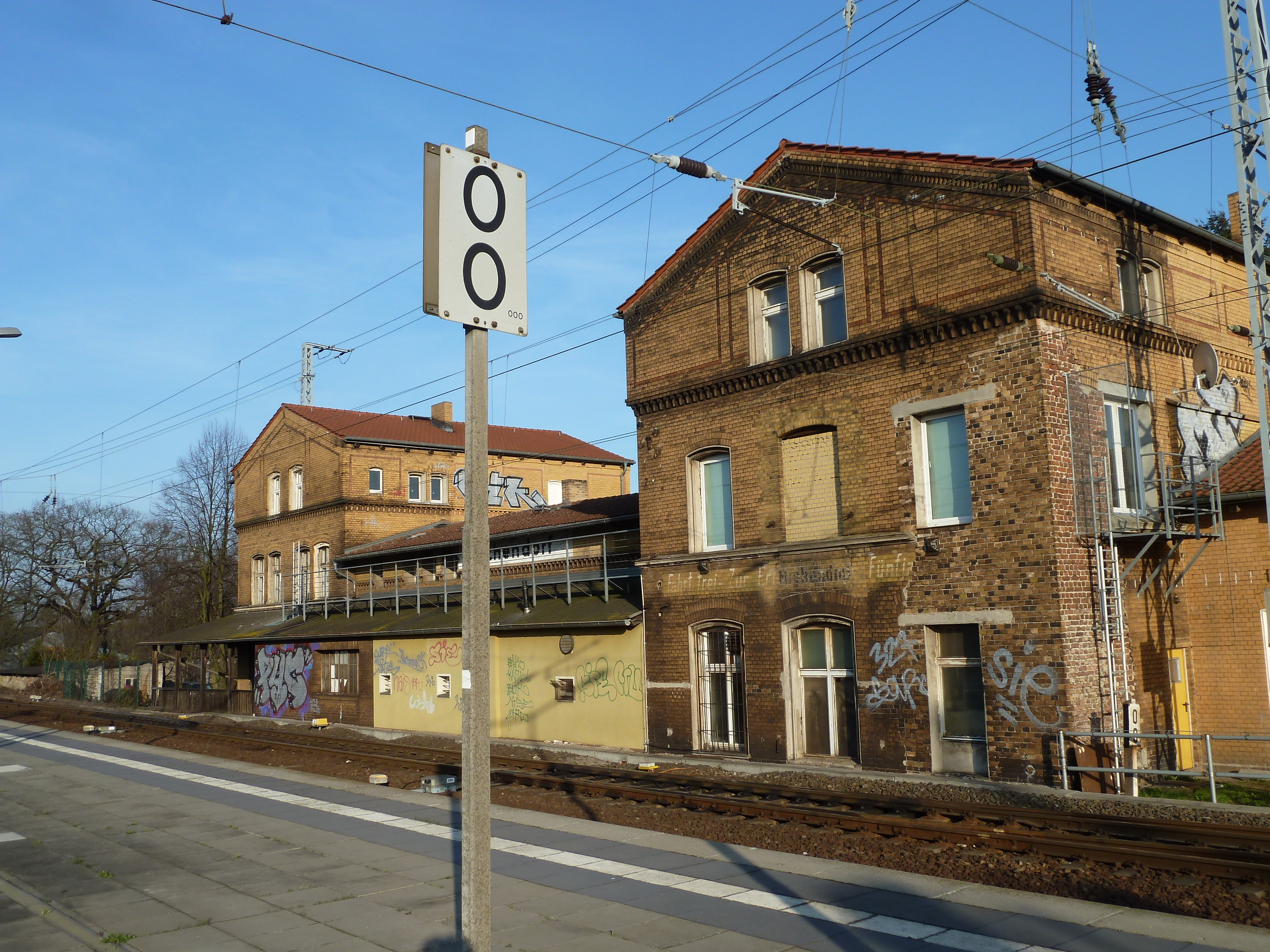
Beginning of the line in Michendorf station

The double-track line begins in Michendorf station, where it separates there from the Berlin-Blankenheim railway. The line runs to the east. In Saarmund it joins the also double-track line of the Berlin Outer Ring from Golm. Beyond Genshagener Heide station and the crossing of the Anhalt railway opened in 1926, the Michendorf–Großbeeren railway separates from the Outer Ring and runs to the north as a single track on the eastern side of the Anhalt line. Originally the line connected in Großbeeren station to the Anhalt line. Since its reconstruction in 2006, it has only connected to the Großbeeren intermodal freight centre (Güterverkehrszentrum, GVZ) and the Teltow freight yard. A direct connection to Berlin no longer exists. Traffic between the Outer Ring and the Anhalt line in the Berlin area has since been operated over a new connection curve to the west of the Anhalt line.

As a result of the inclusion of the Saarmund–Genshagener Heide section in the Outer Ring, the identification number (VzG) used by DB Netz for the track between Saarmund and Genshagener Heide (6126) is one used for a longer section of the Outer Ring, but the chainage used on this section is part of the original chainage for the line between Michendorf and Großbeeren.

== History ==
At the end of the 19th century there were plans for the construction of a bypass railway around Berlin to relieve the congested lines in the city of freight for strategic military reasons. Between 1902 and 1908, the western section of the bypass between Treuenbrietzen, Beelitz, Potsdam Wildpark, Wustermark and Nauen went into operation. In 1915, another section of the bypass railway to the north of Berlin, the Nauen–Oranienburg railway, was opened. From the beginning, there were various plans for the extension of the bypass railway to the south of Berlin. Their implementation was initially prevented by the outbreak of the First World War. In 1923/1924 the large marshalling yard at Seddin was opened. It increased the need for the southern bypass railway. Initially a separate line was opened between Seddin and Michendorf next to the Berlin-Blankenheim railway. On 1 December 1926, the bypass railway was opened from Michendorf to the Anhalt railway at Großbeeren.

It served only freight traffic. An extension of the line to the east to the Köpenick/Mahlsdorf area was planned, but it was not built because of the onset of the Great Depression.

The Nazis planned a large marshalling yard in Großbeeren. Instead of extendending the line to the east from Genshagener Heide, they planned to extend the line on a route trending further north as the Outer Freight Ring (Güteraußenring), branching off from the Anhalt line in the Teltow area. The marshalling yard and the Outer Freight Ring went into provisional operations in early 1940. The route of the Bypass Railway between Michendorf and Genshagener Heide was duplicated at this time and a locomotive depot (Betriebsbahnhof) was built at Genshagener Heide.

=== After the Second World War ===
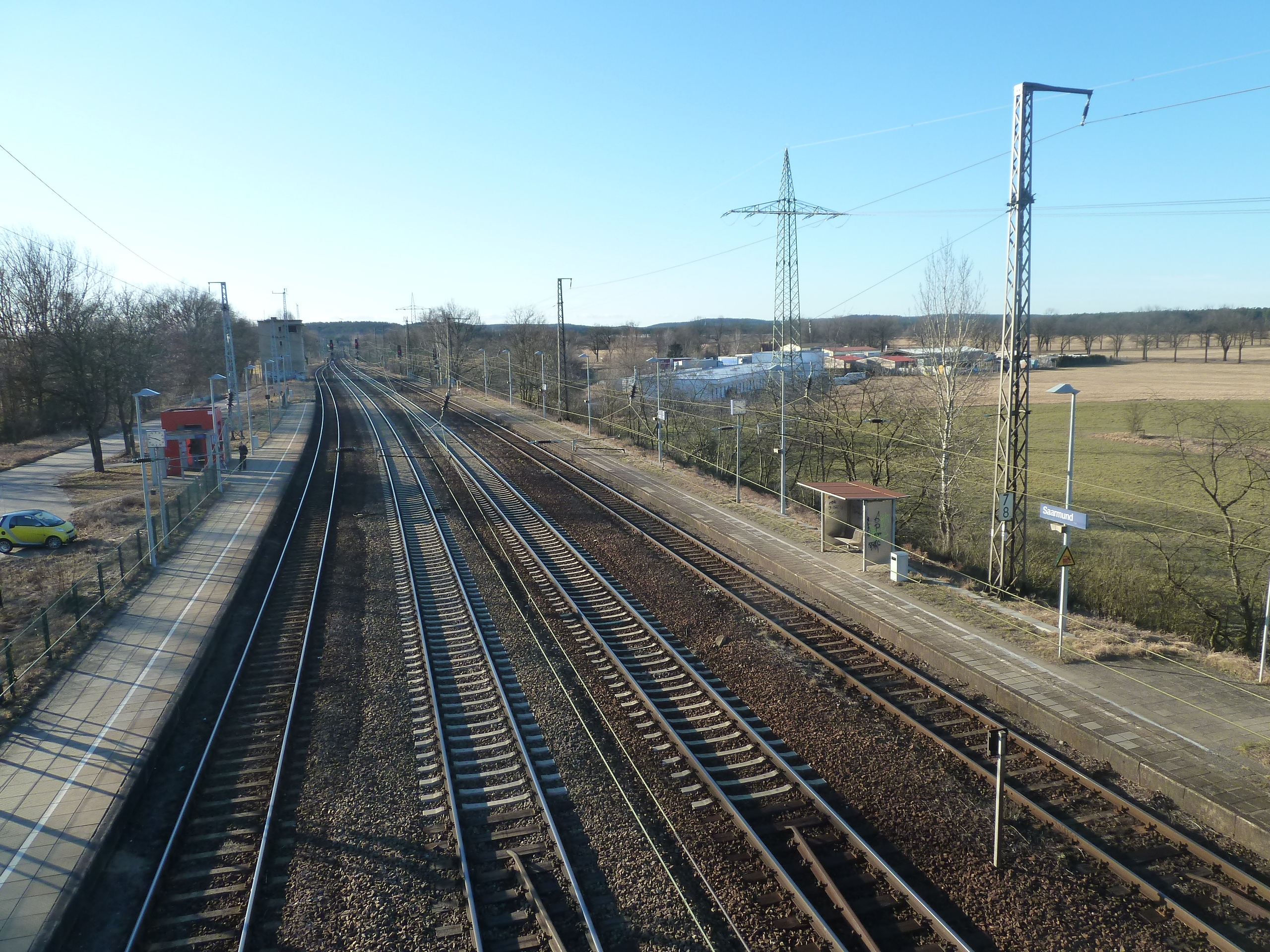
The Bypass Railway from Michendorf and the Outer Ring from Potsdam come together at Saarmund station

Soon after the Second World War—with the developing division of Germany and division of Berlin—the Soviet occupation forces and the German Democratic Republic (East Germany, founded in 1949) needed effective bypass routes around West Berlin. The Outer Freight Ring, which partly ran through West Berlin, was not suitable for this. Several connecting routes around Berlin emerged in the late 1940s and early 1950s, but they were inefficient and some were too far away from Berlin. The first section of the Outer Ring was opened to the east of Genshagener Heide and a subsequent section was opened towards Schönefeld and Grünau cross; these connected to the existing line from Seddin marshalling yard. The last phase of construction of the outer ring was in the late 1950s, when the section between Golm and Saarmund was put in operation, so that the Saarmund–Großbeeren section of the bypass became part of the outer ring. The section between Michendorf and Saarmund remained of great importance as a connection to the Seddin marshalling yard.

In the early 1950s, operations on the mainline tracks of the Anhalt railway between Teltow and West Berlin were abandoned. Nevertheless, the connection from Genshagener Heide to Großbeeren was important for connecting to several rail freight users in Teltow.

The line was electrified in 1982. Thus, the line towards Halle and Leipzig was connected to the Seddin marshalling yard; more electrification in subsequent years connected the main lines to Berlin and to the north of East Germany.

After the fall of the Berlin Wall, a number of direct connections to West Berlin were reopened. The direct line between Michendorf and Berlin-Wannsee was already in operation for freight traffic. The Anhalt Railway in the Berlin area was reopened in 2006 along with the new Berlin Hauptbahnhof. As part of this project, the junction of the Michendorf–Großbeeren railway in Großbeeren station was rebuilt and a new connecting curve was built west of the old line.

=== Traffic ===
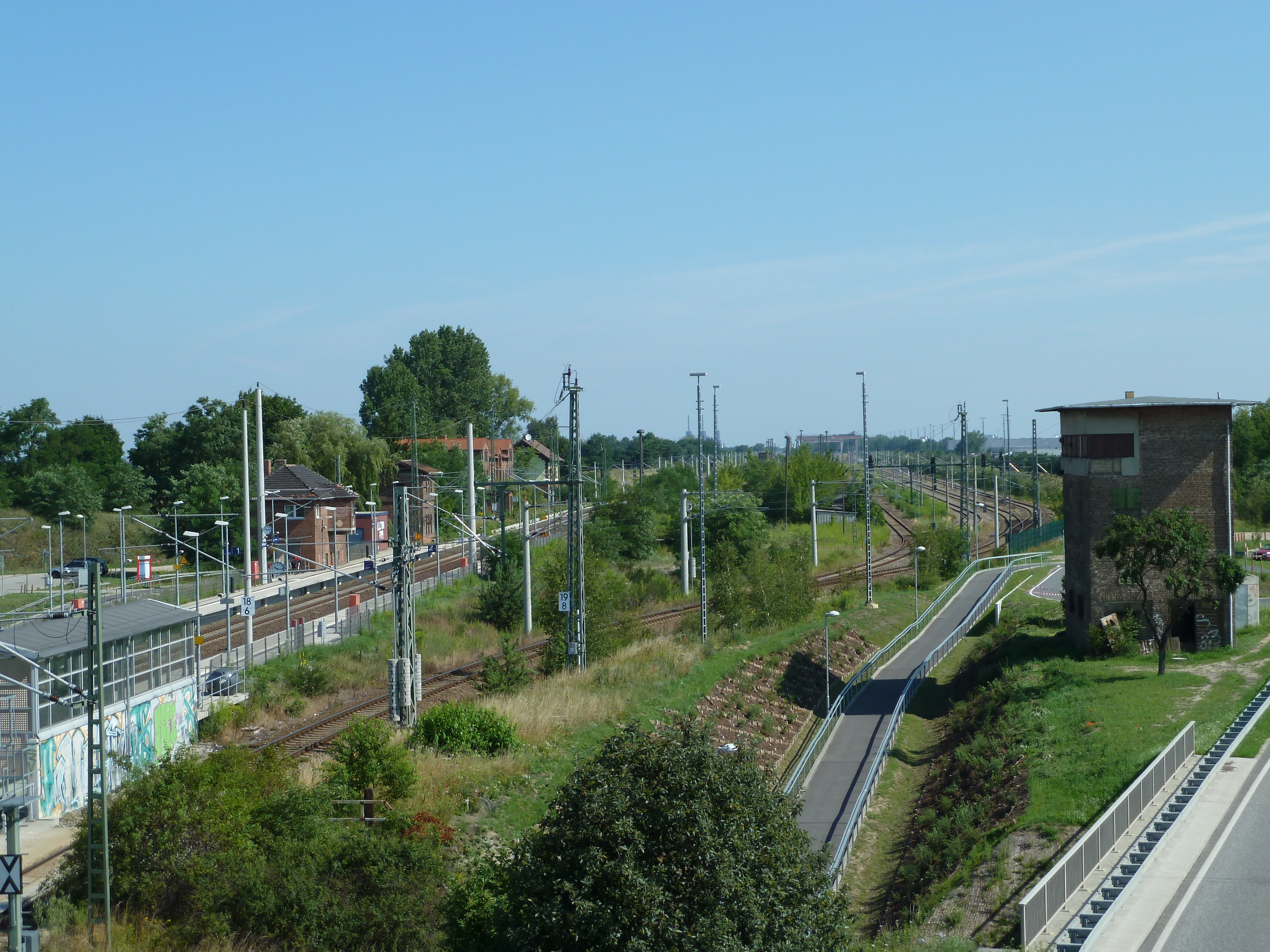
Großbeeren: the Bypass Railway in the foreground and the Anhalt Railway in the background

The route was initially used only for freight. Briefly, in the late 1930s, there were services carrying factory workers to the Daimler-Benz armaments factory in the Genshagener Heide area. In the mid-1950s, passenger services started on the line. It was first served by some express and semi-fast passenger trains from East Berlin towards Dessau and there were also passenger trains on the section from Genshagener Heide to Michendorf, some continuing to Belzig. At times, up to about 1970, the section from Genshagener Heide to Großbeeren and continuing to Teltow was served by some trains during the peak hour because, on the one hand, the Ludwigsfelde car factory had been built near Genshagener Heide station and, on the other hand, it gave a connection towards Berlin. With the completion of the Outer Ring, passenger trains to Potsdam no longer stopped in Michendorf. Bergholz station provided an interchange with services to Michendorf. Some express trains from Berlin to Dessau continued to use the section between Saarmund and Michendorf.

After German reunification, trains running towards Dessau again took the direct route from Berlin-Wannsee . The section between Saarmund and Genshagener Heide was served by RB 22 services, which ran over the Outer Ring between Potsdam and Berlin-Schönefeld. From 1998 to 2011, the service passed through Michendorf, so that in these years the section from Michendorf to Genshagener Heide was again served by passenger services. Since the end of 2011, the line has run from Potsdam to Saarmund directly over the Outer Ring. For another year until December 2012, some trains from Berlin to Belzig that had been diverted due to construction ran on the section. Only the section from Saarmund to Genshagener Heide is now served by passenger services.

In freight transport, the line is important for connecting to and from Seddin marshalling yard and for trains from southern and western Germany to the east that bypass central Berlin. Because freight transport continues to bypass the inner part of the city, the reopening of the connections to West Berlin did not much change the importance of the line for freight traffic. However, the volume of freight on the railway declined compared to the situation during the existence of the German Democratic Republic.
