= GVZ =

GVZ or Gvz may refer to:

- GVZ, abbreviation for Güterverkehrszentrum (freight depot) used in stations such as the Großbeeren station freight centre
- GVZ, governing party of Zulte, Belgium
- Gvz, mineral symbol for Giacovazzoite
