= Berlin Outer Freight Ring =

Overview
- Native name: Güteraußenring/Umfahrungsstrecken
- Line number: 6541 Teltow–Schönefeld; 6008 Schönefeld–Grünauer Kreuz; 6126 Grünauer Kreuz–Eichgestell; 6080 Eichgestell–Biesdorfer Kreuz; 6067 Biesdorfer Kreuz–Berlin-Karow Ost; 6084 Berlin Karow Ost–Berlin-Karow; 6500 Berlin-Karow–Fichtengrund
- Locale: Berlin and Brandenburg, Germany

Technical
- Track gauge: 1,435 mm (4 ft 8 1/2 in) standard gauge

The Berlin Outer Freight Ring (German: Güteraußenring, GAR) was a planned ring railway around the city of Berlin, Germany. The first sections of a line to the west of the city were built in the early 20th century as part of the Brandenburg Bypass Railway (Umgehungsbahn). Even then, there were plans for a bypass south of Berlin. The first bits were built in the early 1920 and more sections followed in the 1930s. The line could not be completed due to the impact of the Second World War. The completed section consisted of a mainly single-track link running from Teltow to Berlin-Karow to the south and east of Berlin. Part of the route line later became part of the Berlin outer ring (Berliner Außenring, BAR).

== Route ==
The Outer Freight Ring began in Teltow freight yard on the Anhalt Railway. The starting point was chosen because the Großbeeren marshalling yard was to be built south of Teltow. From there the Michendorf–Großbeeren railway had connected the Anhalt Railway with the Seddin marshalling yard on the Berlin-Blankenheim railway since 1926. To the south of Teltow station, the now closed Teltow Railway connected to Teltow and various industrial enterprises on the Teltow Canal.

The Outer Freight Ring ran to the east from a junction north of Teltow station. From there, a proposed western extension of the ring to Potsdam via Stahnsdorf has not been realised. The line ran via Osdorf, Lichtenrade (connecting there to the Berlin–Dresden railway) and Großziethen to Schönefeld and from there it substantially followed the modern S-Bahn line via Altglienicke to Grünau Cross. Next, the route ran to the north taking a route close to today's Outer Ring from Eichgestell via Wuhlheide to Biesdorf Cross. There it passed under the Eastern Railway and continued to Karow to connect with the Stettin (now the Berlin–Szczecin) railway.

A bypass route built after the war ran from Karow, using a portion of the Heidekraut Railway (Heidekrautbahn or Heather Railway), via Basdorf to Wensickendorf. It continued via Schmachtenhagen to Oranienburg. There was a connection to the Nauen–Oranienburg section of the Brandenburg Bypass Railway, which ran around northern and western Berlin.

== History ==
Various projects to bypass Berlin were developed at the beginning of the 20th century, especially to remove rail freight from the lines through the city, and some were built. In 1902/1904, the line from Treuenbrietzen near Jüterbog via Potsdam Wildpark, Wustermark to Nauen was opened. In 1915, the line from Nauen via Kremmen to Oranienburg followed. There was also a plan for another link from Michendorf to Biesdorf via Wuhlheide, with a marshalling yard being built south of Michendorf. In March 1914 the Landtag of Prussia considered a draft railway bond bill, which included, among other things, funds for the construction of this connection, now extending in the new east to Mahlsdorf. While construction had not started at the outbreak of the First World War, its planning was being managed by the Prussian railways architect Waldemar Suadicani. Operations on the 57 kilometre-long line were not expected to be profitable, but there was an urgent need for a relief railway network in Berlin and it was considered to have high military value. The new line would have grade-separated junctions. In Seddin and Berlin-Köpenick station it would run parallel with the old line in the interchange station, as already occurred on the existing Jüterbog–Nauen railway at Wusterpark and Wildpark stations. In Berlin-Köpenick an overpass was planned east of the station over the Silesian-Railway (now the Berlin–Guben railway). A two-track connecting curve was provided towards the Berlin-Rummelsburg yard, while only single track links would have been built at the intersections with the Berlin–Halle railway (Anhalt Railway) and the Berlin–Dresden railway. Another yard was planned in the Mahlsdorf area. In 1922, after the First World War, 44 million Marks were approved for the construction of these projects in the budget of the Reich Ministry of Transport. The Seddin freight yard was opened in the early 1920s and a link to Großbeeren on the Anhalt Railway was opened in 1926. Continued construction was prevented by the Great Depression.

=== The construction of the Outer Freight Ring ===
The earlier plans envisaged that the route of the Freight Ring from Genshagener Heide to Wuhlheide would run approximately on the route of today's BAR. In fact, construction began in 1938 on a more northerly route from Teltow via Lichtenrade, Großziethen and Schönefeld. The reason was that a marshalling yard was under construction in the Großbeeren area.

The line was initially built temporary as a single track and to lower construction standards than planned with some narrow curves and steep inclines. The Teltow–Friedrichsfelde Ost section was completed on 16 December 1940 and the extension to Karow followed on 22 September 1941. Work began on duplicating the southern part of the line in 1944. The second track was completed from Teltow to Lichtenrade and the crossing loop at Osdorf was abandoned. It is not known whether the second track was completed to Großziethen or beyond.

=== Further development ===
After the Second World War, the second track was dismantled for war reparations and the section between Biesenhorst and Karow was dismantled in 1947.

The division of Germany created a need to bypass West Berlin. In 1950, a connection was built from Berlin-Karow to Basdorf on the Heidekraut Railway and an extension from Wensickendorf to the Northern Railway to Fichtengrund at Oranienburg. It had nothing to do with the original plan for the Outer Freight Ring, which would have run further south, partly through the area then belonging to West Berlin. The chainage of the existing GAR was continued on the new route. The Biesenhorst–Karow section was rebuilt. A connection from Oranienburg to Velten was also opened in 1951.

Parts of the Outer Freight Ring were included in the building of the Berlin Outer Ring, such as the Wendenheide–Springpfuhl section opened in 1951. The section of the GAR between Teltow and Schönefeld could not be used because it crossed the border between West Berlin city and East Germany several times. Therefore, the Outer Ring was built on a new route that was based on the original plans for the freight bypass from before 1930. The S-Bahn line to Schönefeld Airport, which was opened on 6 February 1962 after the construction of the Berlin Wall, was built on the route of the GAR between Schönefeld and Grünau Cross. A connecting curve between the GAR and the Wriezen Railway (Herzberg curve) was put into operation in May 1951. It branched north from Springpfuhl station at the Sgn signalbox and connected to the Wriezen Railway running north from Magerviehhof station and enabled passenger trains to run to Lichtenberg station, which took over the traffic from the Stettiner Bahnhof. In 1957, the section of the GAR between Springpfuhl and Karow was closed and replaced by the new route of the largely two-track Berlin Outer Ring. From 1957 until the completion of the Biesdorf Cross in 1971, the single-track GAR remained in operation between Springpfuhl Sgn signalbox and Wuhlheide. After that this section was also replaced by a two-track section of the Outer Ring. The Lichtenrade–Großziethen section is still shown on a Deutsche Reichsbahn map of 1959.

As a result of the building of the Berlin Wall in 1961, the line from Teltow to Schönefeld was almost completely dismantled, so that now its remains are hard to discern. Sections in Lichtenrade connected to the Dresden Railway, which were only located on West Berlin territory, served until the 1970s as connections to local factories. The direct connection of the Heidekraut Railway to Wilhelmsruh was interrupted by the Wall. Thus all traffic towards Berlin subsequently ran via the Karow–Basdorf bypass.

The section between Wensickendorf and the Northern Railway served as the detour route and had military-strategic purposes. A section of the line in Schmachtenhagen was built with mixed gauge, to allow rollingstock built for Soviet broad gauge to be tested. After German reunification in 1990, this section was no longer useful and it was decommissioned on 20 February 1999. The Wensickendorf–Schmachtenhagen section was reactivated in 2000 and transferred in 2001 to the Niederbarnimer Eisenbahn, which had taken over the Berlin-Karow–Basdorf route on 1 July 2000.

=== Passengers ===
Several sections of the line, which was for freight, also carried scheduled passenger services for a time.

In 1946–47, long-distance services from the Anhalt and Dresden railways ran over the Outer Freight Ring between Teltow and Eichgestell, where they joined the Berlin–Wrocław railway.

Berlin-Grünau–Schönefeld–Großziethen–Lichtenrade

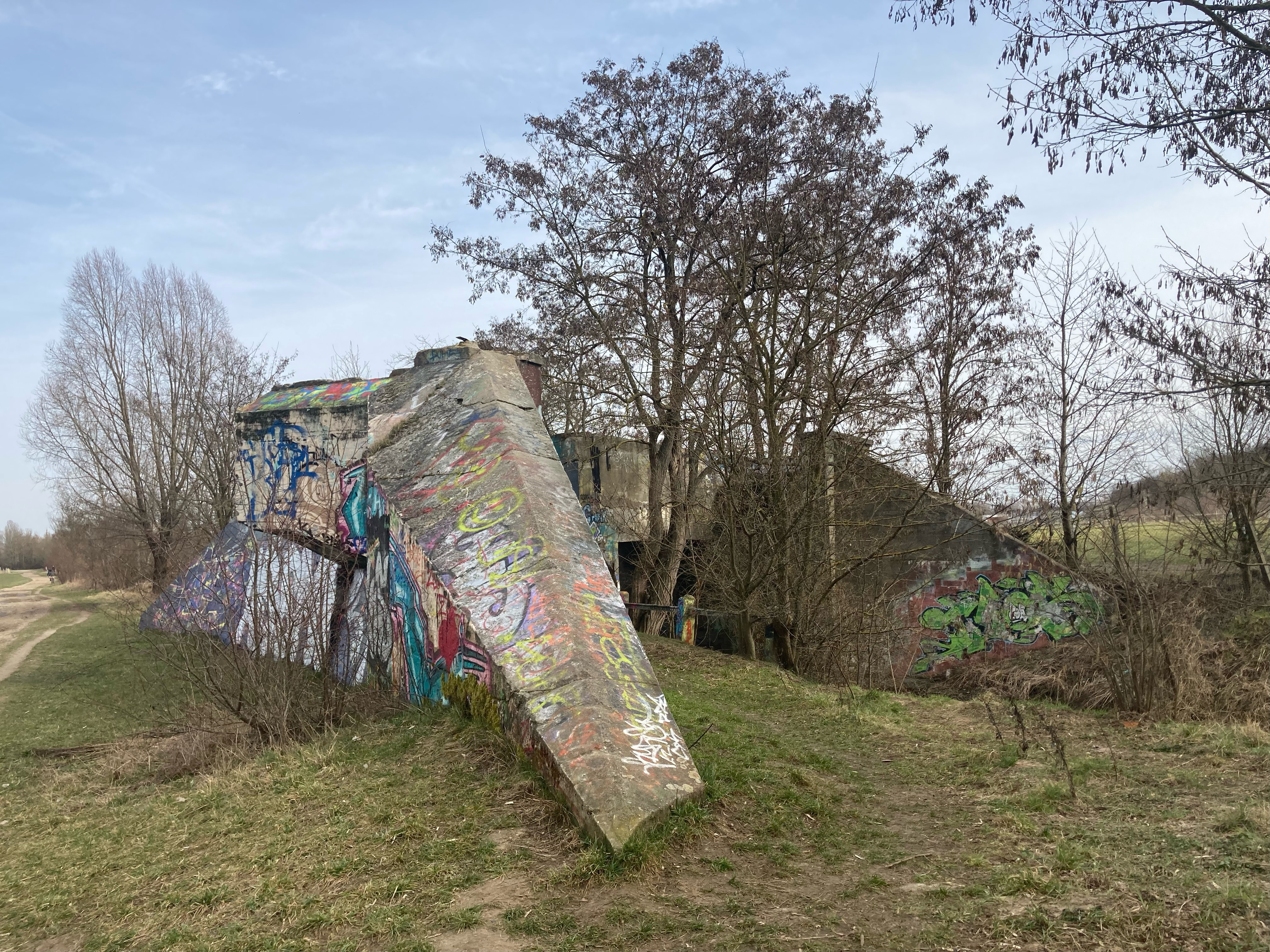
Bridge remnant near Großziethen, towards Berlin-Rudow.

Services operated with railcars (approximately hourly) from Grünau towards Lichtenrade via Schönefeld and Großziethen were introduced on 26 July 1948. With the reopening of limited cross-border traffic to West Berlin after the end of the Berlin Blockade, it was discontinued on 21 March 1951. Services were restored to Großziethen, but running over the newly built Berlin Outer Ring, first to Schöneweide from 1952 and to Grünau from 3 October 1954. Traffic ended on 31 May 1958. S-Bahn services continue on the GAR between Grünau Cross and Schönefeld.

Berlin-Grünau–Berlin-Kaulsdorf

Services were also introduced on 26 July 1948 in the east of Berlin that ran from Grunau towards Kaulsdorf via Wuhlheide. A number of stops were established. This traffic ended in March 1949.

Berlin-Karow–Basdorf

With the building of the Wall in 1961, the connection of the Heidekraut Railway to Wilhelmsruh was cut. After that, the trains ran from Basdorf via Schönerlinde to Berlin-Karow (until 1976 to Berlin-Blankenburg).

Wensickendorf–Fichtengrund

The Wensickendorf–Fichtengrund section was used occasionally for diversion of trains coming from Neustrelitz. In the 1987/88 timetable, several scheduled expresses ran on this route instead of via Oranienburg. Since 30 June 1992, there has been no freight traffic on this line. In the summer of 2000 the Niederbarnimer Eisenbahn reactivated the Wensickendorf–Schmachtenhagen section. Since then, some services have been extended from Wensickendorf to serve the farmer’s market in Schmachtenhagen at the weekend.

== Sources ==
- Bernd Kuhlmann (1997). Der Berliner Außenring (in German). Nordhorn: Kenning. ISBN 3-927587-65-6.
- Bernd Kuhlmann (1996). Eisenbahn-Größenwahn in Berlin. Die Planungen 1933 bis 1945 und deren Realisierung (in German). Berlin: GVE. ISBN 3-89218-035-0.
- Michael Braun (1989). "Zur Frühschicht nach Hennigsdorf. Vorgeschichte, Bau und Betrieb der ehemaligen Nebenbahn Velten–Oranienburg". Verkehrsgeschichtliche Blätter (in German). Berlin: 30ff. ISSN 0232-9042.
