= Teltow station =

Railway station in Teltow, Germany

Teltow
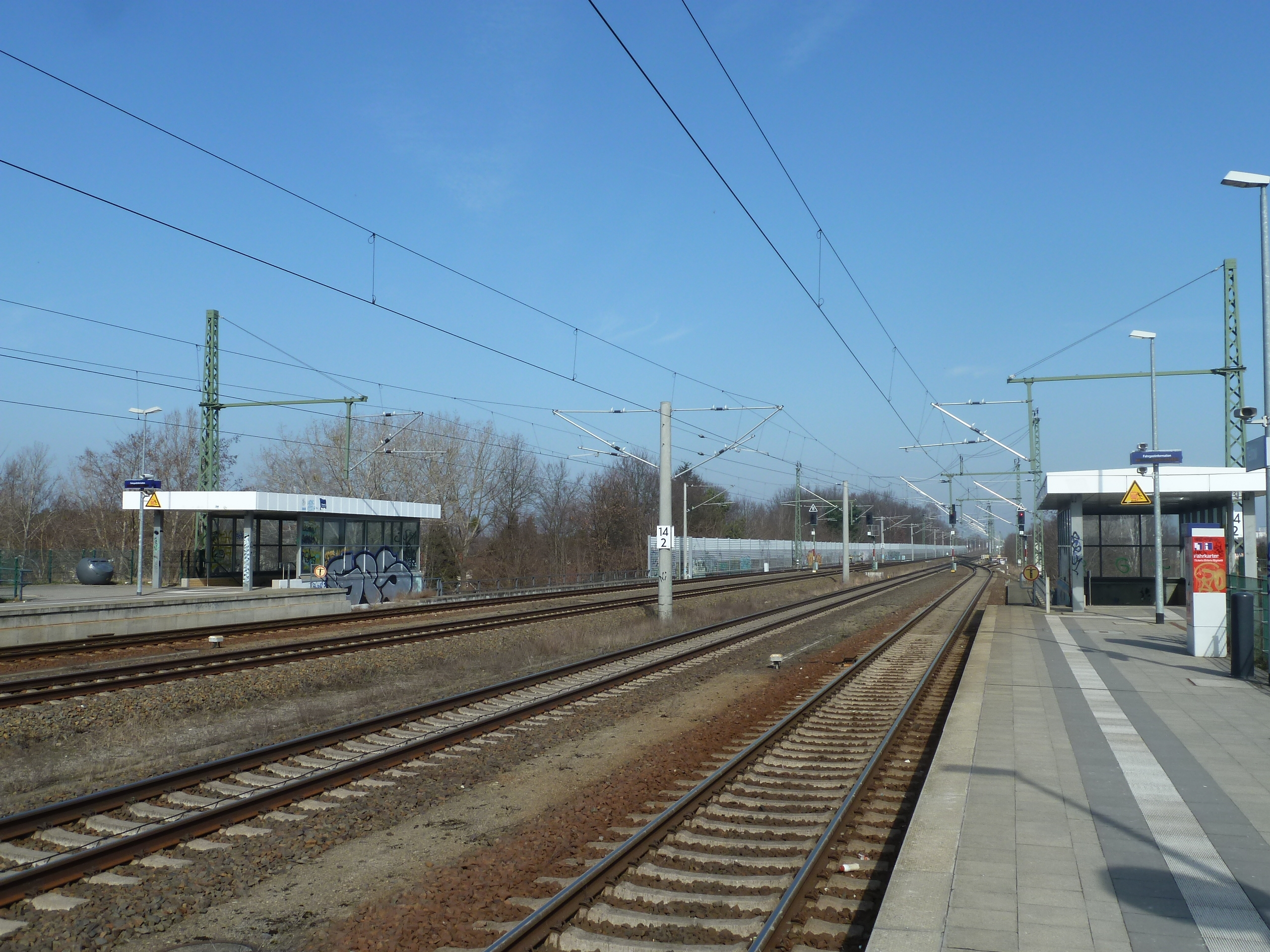
- Teltow railway station

General information
- Location: Mahlower Str 231, Teltow, Brandenburg; Germany
- Coordinates: 52°23′17″N 13°17′58″E
- Owner: DB Netz
- Operator: DB Station&Service
- Lines: Anhalt Railway; Anhalt Suburban Line (dismantled); Outer Freight Ring (dismantled); Teltow Railway (dismantled)
- Platforms: 2
- Tracks: 4

Construction
- Accessible: Yes

Other information
- Station code: 6165
- DS100 code: BTL
- IBNR: 8013100
- Category: 6
- Fare zone: VBB: Berlin C and Potsdam C/5953
- Website: www.bahnhof.de

History
- Opened: 1 October 1901; 124 years ago
- Closed: 13 August 1961; 65 years ago
- Electrified: 7 July 1951; 75 years ago main line: 10 December 2005; 20 years ago

Services
Preceding station	Ostdeutsche Eisenbahn	Following station
Berlin-Lichterfelde Ost towards Rathenow	RE 4	Großbeeren towards Falkenberg (Elster)
Location
- Location within Brandenburg Location within Germany Location within Europe

Teltow station is located in the town of Teltow on the Anhalt Railway south of Berlin and was opened in 1901. Since then, the station has been repeatedly remodelled. The station served regional passenger and freight traffic and was the terminus of a Berlin S-Bahn service from 1950 to 1961. The direct connection to Berlin was lost with the construction of the Berlin Wall in 1961. It was restored in 2006.

Teltow Station should not be confused with Teltow Stadt (town) station, which opened in 2005 and is near the centre of the town at the end of a branch line of the S-Bahn and about 2 kilometres to the north-west of Teltow station.

== Location ==
The railway station is located south of Berlin at the intersection of Berlin–Halle railway with Mahlower Straße (the road to Mahlow) about three kilometres east of central Teltow in the district of Potsdam-Mittelmark in the state of Brandenburg. Originally, the station was built far outside the town in open fields, but the area between the town and the station is now occupied by housing estates. The locality of Heinersdorf lies two kilometres to the east on the boundary of the Teltow-Fläming district and is part of the Teltow settlement of Sigridshorst, which lies about one kilometre further north.

== History ==
The town of Teltow initially had no connection to the Anhalt Railway, which was opened in 1840 and ran a few kilometres to the east of the town. A passenger and postal service was subsequently established towards Zehlendorf station on the Berlin–Magdeburg railway. In 1872 the Berlin-Anhalt Railway Company planned a connection from Lichterfelde via Teltow and Stahnsdorf to Potsdam, but this project was not realised. A steam tramway called the Dampfstraßenbahn Gross-Lichterfelde (Anhalter Bahnhof)–Seehof–Teltow was opened in 1888; this became part of the Teltow District Railway (Teltower Kreisbahnen) in 1906 and was electrified in the following year. In 1889 there were again plans for a railway from Potsdam via Teltow to Köpenick, which were also not realised. Later separate sections of the Brandenburg Bypass Railway (Umgehungsbahn) were built that did not run directly to Teltow.

In the second half of the 1890s a bigger effort was made to connect the town of Teltow with a fully developed railway. Applications were sent to the Königliche Eisenbahn-Direktion Halle (Royal Railway Division of Halle), which was responsible for the Anhalt Railway. Once part of the required land was handed over by the town and of the surrounding landowners to the railway company free of charge, construction work could begin.

=== Teltow station ===
Teltow station was opened for all traffic on 1 October 1901. The volume of traffic developed well with freight rising especially quickly. The station was served from the beginning by all passenger trains operating on the line, which amounted to ten to twelve trains in each direction in 1904. The Teltower Industriebahn (Teltow Industrial Railway, later the Teltower Eisenbahn—Teltow Railway) was opened in 1909, connecting the station to various industrial companies in the town and to the port opened in 1906 on the Teltow Canal. In the early 1910s, the station trackwork and the station building were extended. In 1923, responsibility for the railway facilities in Teltow was transferred from the Reichsbahn railway division (Reichsbahndirektion) of Halle to the railway division of Berlin. Moreover, there were plans for the quadruplication of the Anhalt Railway in the Teltow area in order to create separate suburban tracks.

The town of Teltow gradually developed towards Teltow station, which it reached by the 1930s. Berlin suburb fares were extended to Teltow in 1938.

=== Conversions in 1940 ===
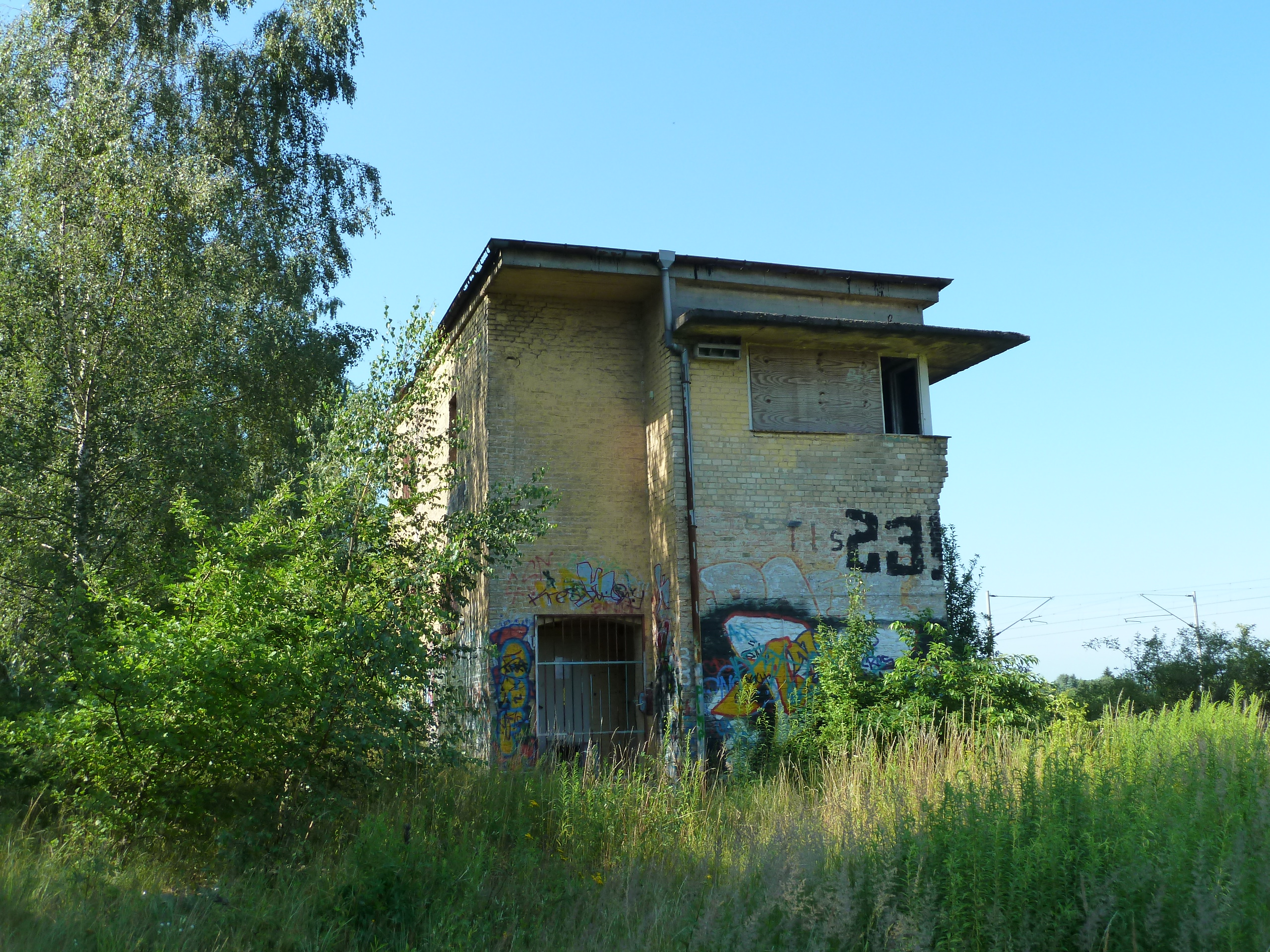
Former Tls signalbox at the junction to the Großbeeren auxiliary marshalling yard

As part of the Nazis' Welthauptstadt Germania plan, which was partly based on earlier plans, there were a variety of plans in the 1930s to transform the railway yards in the Berlin area, some affecting the Teltow area. Some of these projects were approved for construction. A new marshalling yard was planned in Großbeeren, which would extend between Großbeeren station and Teltow station on the east side of the tracks of the Anhalt Railway. Instead of implementing old plans for a bypass railway south of Berlin, it was planned to build the Outer Freight Ring (Güteraußenring) on a route that ran further north than the Outer Ring (Außenring) that was built later. The provisional Outer Freight Ring between Teltow station and Biesenhorst (west of Kaulsdorf station on the Eastern Railway) was opened on 16 December 1940. Construction started in 1939 on a railway that ran to Tempelhof from Großbeeren station and was used for the construction of Großbeeren marshalling yard and the planned locomotive depot at Lichterfelde Süd. The Hilfsrangierbahnhof (auxiliary marshalling yard) Großbeeren was opened in 1941. As a result of the war these projects were implemented on a temporary basis; more construction projects such as the western extension of the outer freight ring north from Teltow via Stahnsdorf to Potsdam were omitted except for a few early works.

Further work was carried out on the Anhalt Railway. Here the local and long-distance tracks were separated in conjunction with the transfer of the tracks from ground level on to an embankment. As early as 1919 there were plans for the building of earthworks to raise the Anhalt Railway between Lichterfelde and Großbeeren. This work, however, was delayed for nearly 20 years until it was resumed in 1938. In 1943, the separate suburban tracks from Berlin-Lichterfelde Ost to Ludwigsfelde were put into operation, but electric S-Bahn operations from central Berlin ended at Lichterfelde Süd station. Teltow was subsequently served only by suburban trains as the through passenger trains on the Anhalt Railway had resumed stopping only in Ludwigsfelde.

=== After the end of the Second World War ===
The suburban traffic from Lichterfelde to Ludwigsfelde was resumed after the war on 24 December 1945. The border between the Soviet occupation of Berlin and the American zone, which later became the border between East Germany and West Berlin. ran north of Teltow station.

Much of the trackwork of the station and the mainline tracks near the station were dismantled as war reparations to the Soviet Union or were used to substitute for other dismantled tracks. From 1950, passengers on trains to Berlin stopped in Teltow station, for which a low-quality track was rebuilt. On 7 July 1951, the DC operations of the Berlin S-Bahn were extended from Lichterfelde Süd to Teltow. In this context, the separate suburban tracks from Teltow went to Ludwigsfelde were taken out of service. On 18 May 1952, long-distance transport towards West Berlin was abandoned and the tracks were dismantled. Teltow station was only accessible—except for the S-Bahn tracks—in both directions via the former construction railway which had been provided during the war with a temporary platform. In addition, since 1951, the suburban trains that had previously run to Ludwigsfelde ended in Teltow. Until the mid-1950s, occasional freight traffic operated towards West Berlin. By 1960, it was clearly established that no more freight traffic would run to West Berlin via Teltow.

The DC line of the S-Bahn was powered from a mobile rectifier plant at Berlin-Lichterfelde. A stationary rectifier plant at Teltow station was under construction and was planned to become operational in 1961.

=== After the building of the Wall ===
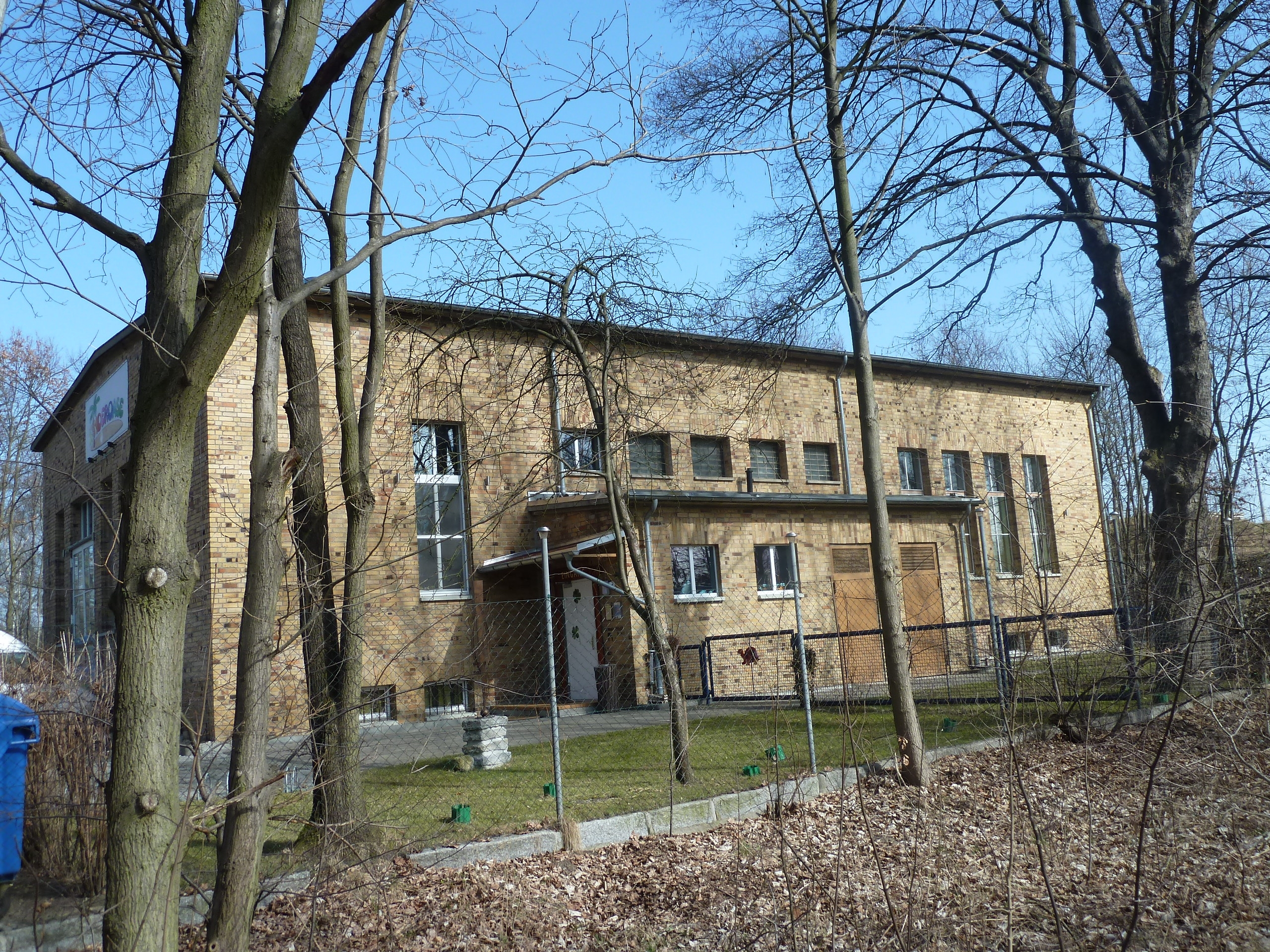
The rectifier unit for the S-Bahn was taken out of operation in 1961. The building is heritage-listed.

The Berlin Wall completely severed the railway line between Teltow and Lichterfelde. The remaining tracks of the S-Bahn line and the freight railway were blocked and the bridge of the S-Bahn line over the Machnower Straße was dismantled. The rectifier plant was taken out of operation.

Teltow station was thus accessible only from Ludwigsfelde and by a connecting curve at Genshagener Heide station from the Outer Ring coming from the west. Its use for passenger services declined sharply as both Berlin and Potsdam could only reached by train with substantial detours. It remained active at first, but trains towards Ludwigsfelde were later thinned (1962: 14 trains; 1989: 6-8 trains per day in each direction), with some trains continuing directly towards Jüterbog. Immediately after the Wall was built, there were two pairs of trains during peak hour running via Genshagener Heide to Berlin. In 1963 they were discontinued, but a pair of early trains continued to operate to Genshagener Heide until 1983. The majority of passengers used buses that connected Potsdam via Teltow town centre and Teltow station with Berlin Schönefeld Airport station. In the 1980s, it operated every 30 minutes and between Teltow and Potsdam station it ran every 15 minutes on weekdays.

Electrification of the line through Teltow station was completed on 30 July 1982.

=== Development after 1990 ===
Soon after the fall of the Berlin Wall there were requests for the resumption of S-Bahn services to Teltow. However, there were long discussions about whether such a service should run to Teltow station, which was far from the centre of the town, or whether planning started in the 1930s for a new line and a station closer to central Teltow should be resumed. The Federal Ministry of Transport finally agreed in 1997 to finance this line. The Berlin-Lichterfelde Süd–Teltow Stadt railway and the Teltow Stadt station opened on 24 February 2005.

The old Teltow station was still exclusively served in passenger operations by regional trains from Ludwigsfelde, but the service frequency was increased to provide an hourly service from May 1993. Passenger traffic in Teltow was closed on 24 May 1998 because work had begun to rebuild the Anhalt Railway to Berlin; the overhead wire had been dismantled a year earlier.

The reconstructed route and the rebuilt Teltow station returned to operation on 28 May 2006. It was rebuilt in an elevated position with parts of the old station retained for freight.

Teltow station is served by the RE 4 service from Ludwigsfelde via Berlin to Rathenow every hour. At the beginning and ends of the day this service does not operate, but trains of the RE 5 services, which normally pass through without stopping, stop in Teltow at those times.

== Infrastructure ==
Initially, the station had two outside platforms on the two through tracks and some tracks for freight on the west side. A small building made of timber and bricks served as an entrance building. Later sidings were added, first one towards Halle, then one towards Berlin in 1920. In 1931 there were extensive freight facilities on the west side of the tracks. The freight shed was located next to the entrance building. To the south, there were a number of sidings, to which the Teltow Industrial Railway was connected. The Tlo signalbox was on the eastern side of the tracks next to Machnower Straße.

=== After 1940 ===
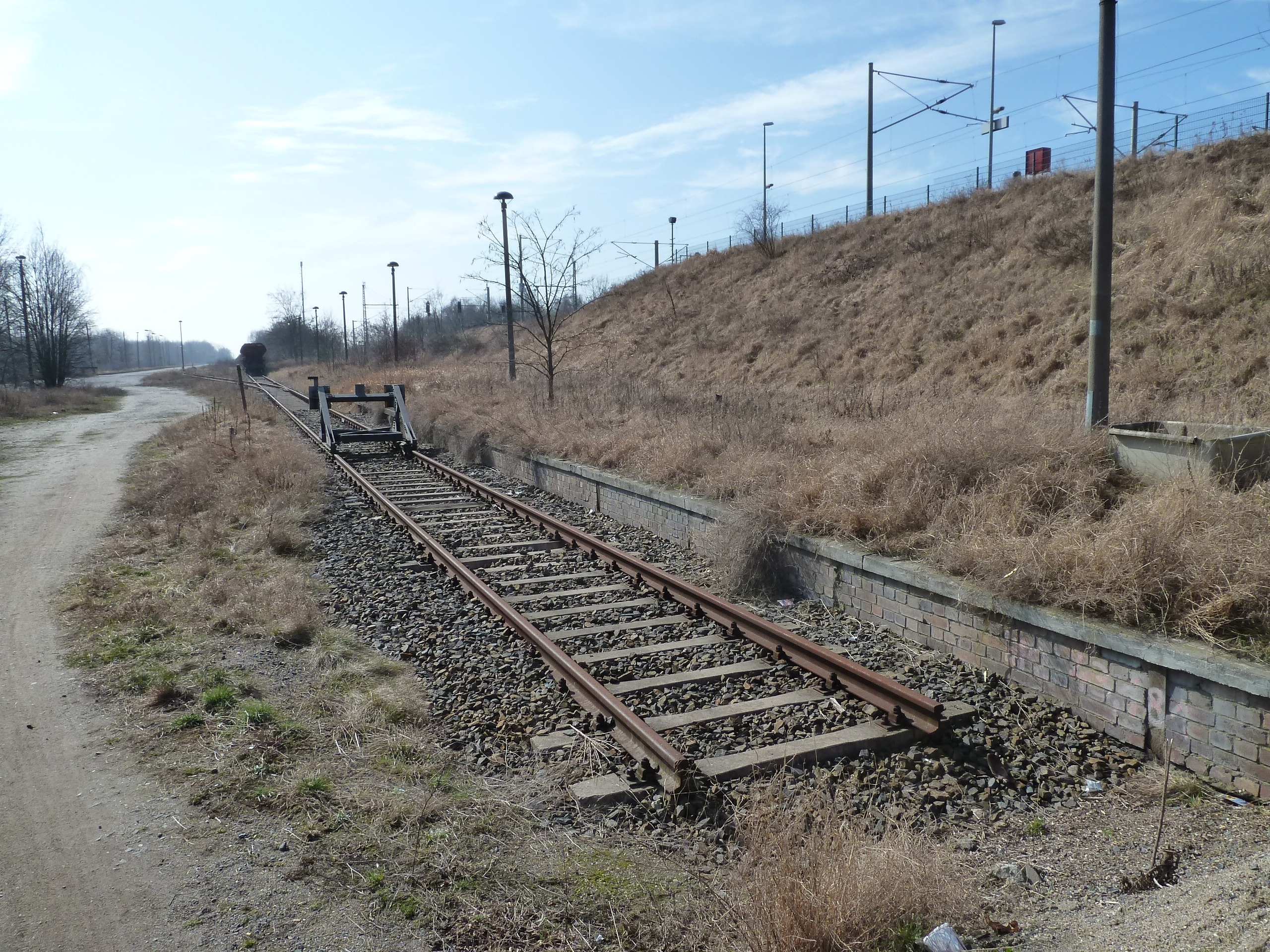
Freight tracks; to the right are the remains of the platform unused since 1998

The embankment for local and long-distance tracks was built on the west side of the railway tracks through the site of the former freight facilities and entrance building. A construction operations station, where freight was handled, was built east of it at ground level. The suburban platform was accessed via a tunnel which initially had one exit on the western side. Once the new works were completed after the Second World War, trains running towards Ludwigsfelde stopped at the former construction operations station. In 1952, the tunnel was extended to the eastern side of the tracks. A small, barracks-like station building was built on the entrance to the lower platform.

After the construction of the Berlin Wall, the S-Bahn tracks and the bridge over Machnower Straße were dismantled. The embankment and the tunnel remained until the next station reconstruction in the late 1990s.

The station then had a platform with two platform edges for passenger trains. The freight operations area, which had two loading tracks, was located to the east.

=== Current situation ===
The through station is elevated above Machnower Straße, where it is crossed by the railway tracks. It consists of two platform tracks outside the through tracks, which extend south of the road on both sides and have external platforms. East of the through tracks there are some tracks for freight at ground level. These are connected to Anhalt Railway only in Großbeeren station and the freight yard is considered part of the precincts of Großbeeren station. Southwest of the station there are still some remnants of the tracks of the Teltow Railway, which are no longer connected to the main line.

=== Access to the Teltow Railway ===
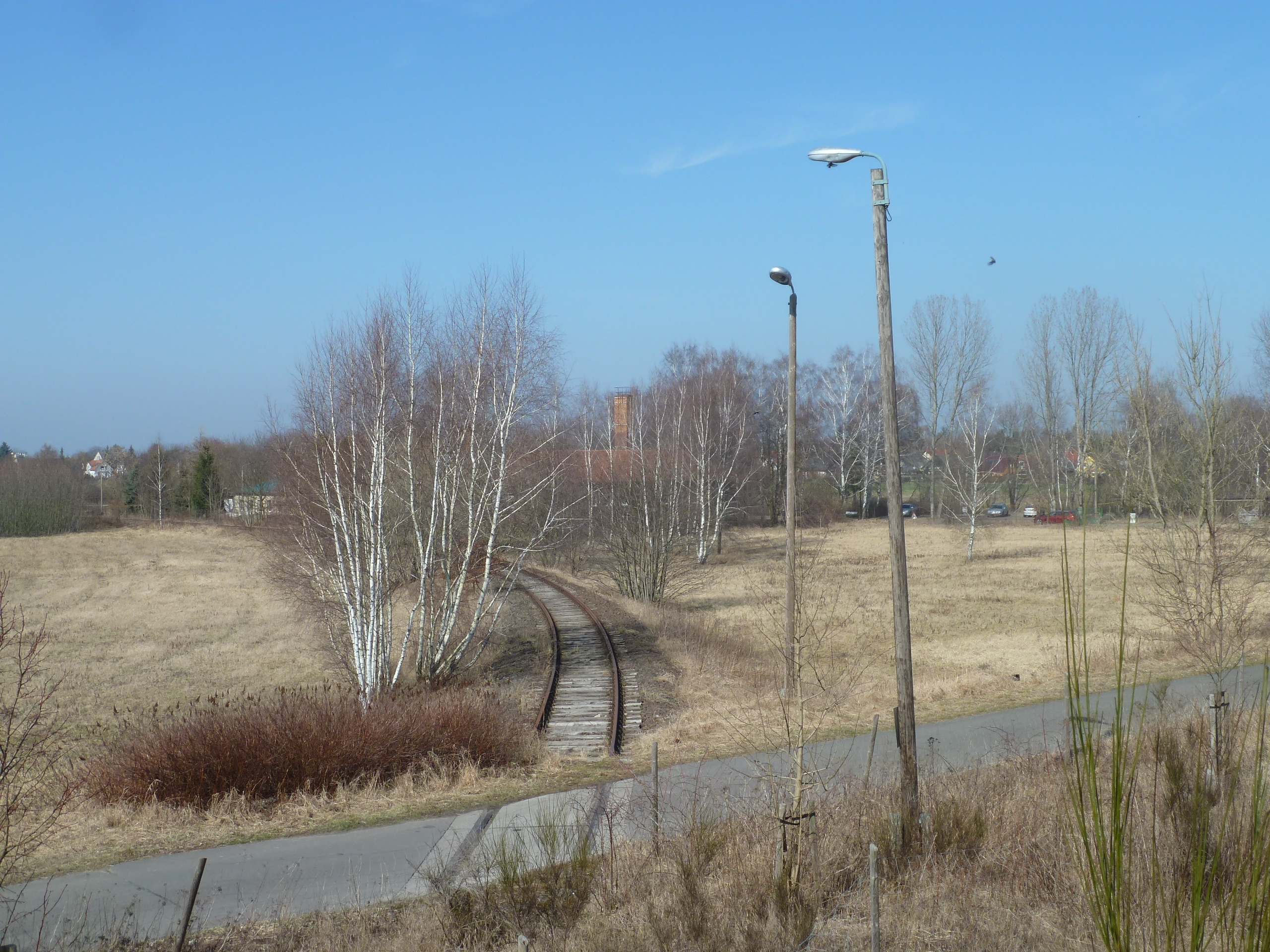
Beginning of Teltow Railway to the south of Teltow station, seen from the embankment of the former suburban tracks.

The route of the Teltow Railway ran from Teltow station to the south and west of the town of Teltow to Teltow port on Oderstraße on Teltow Canal. The connection of this freight line to the station has been repeatedly changed. Originally it branched off the Anhalt line at the south end of the station and ran to the southwest. However, the embankment built in 1940 for the planned suburban and long-distance tracks severed this connection. Therefore, a new route was built that branched off to the north of the station and ran to the northwest and under the tracks of the mainline to Berlin. In Sigridshorst, it connected to a western extension from the Outer Freight Ring. The trains of the Teltow Railway reversed in Sigridshorst and ran west of Teltow station along the railway line until they reached the original route. After the Second World War, the railway embankment south of Teltow was no longer needed and partially removed. Since the through connection from Teltow to the north was limited by the new border, it became no longer usable and the Teltow Railway was reconnected at the south end of Teltow station to run towards Großbeeren station.

=== Rectifier installation ===
The "rectifier installation with courtyard paving and access road and the associated paved section of Bahnstraße" is heritage-listed. It is located on the western side of the railway tracks. It was built around 1960 and was almost completed in the summer of 1961. Because of the building of the Wall, the S-Bahn line was disrupted and thus the rectifier installation became superfluous. As a result, the technical facilities were dismantled. The construction of the installation has been preserved and is now used as part of a children's playground.

== Train services ==
The station is served by the following service(s):

- Regional services RE 4 Rathenow - Berlin - Ludwigsfelde - Jüterbog
