= Jüterbog–Nauen railway =

Railway line in Germany

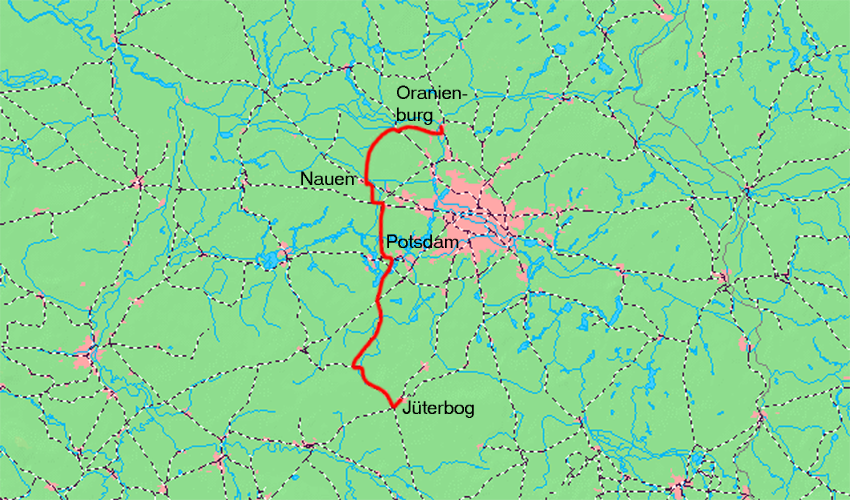
- The Jüterbog–Nauen railway and the Nauen–Oranienburg railway of the freight bypass

Overview
- Line number: 6511 Jüterbog–Beelitz Stadt; 6115 Beelitz Stadt–Golm; 6068 Golm–Priort; 6105 Priort–Nauen
- Locale: Brandenburg, Germany

Service
- Route number: 209.21, 209.22, 209.33

Technical
- Line length: 90.1 km (56.0 mi)
- Track gauge: 1,435 mm (4 ft 8 1/2 in) standard gauge
- Electrification: Wustermark–Ferch-Lienewitz: 15 kV/16.7 Hz AC overhead catenary

The Jüterbog–Nauen railway is a line that runs to the west of Berlin through the German state of Brandenburg. It runs from Jüterbog via Treuenbrietzen, Beelitz, Potsdam, Wustermark to Nauen. The line is a part of the Bypass Railway (Umgehungsbahn), which was primarily designed to relieve congestion on the railways in Berlin. The Wustermark–Nauen section has been closed, the Golm–Priort section is now a part of the Berlin outer ring and has been rebuilt as a double-track main line.

== History ==
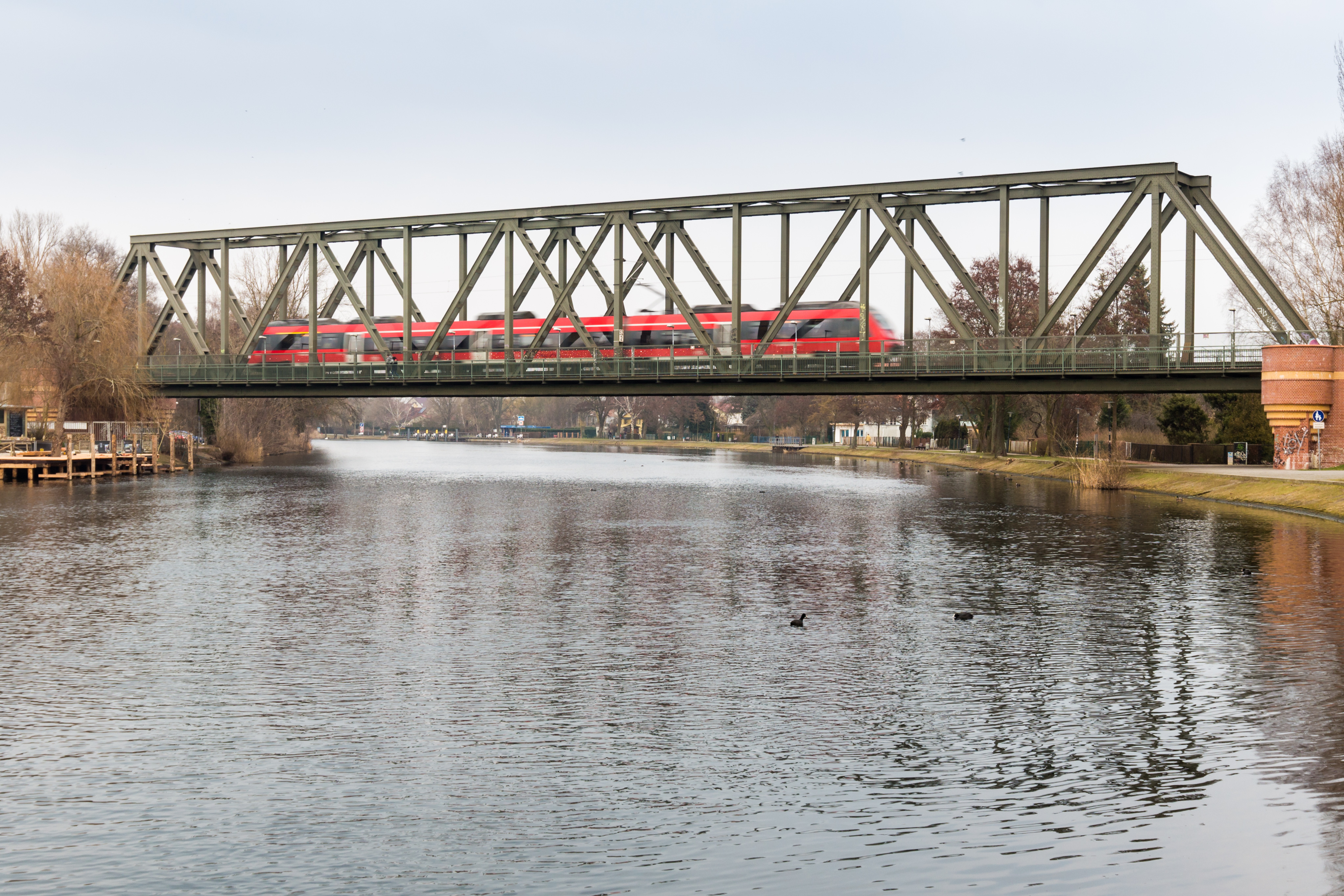
Havel bridge near Caputh

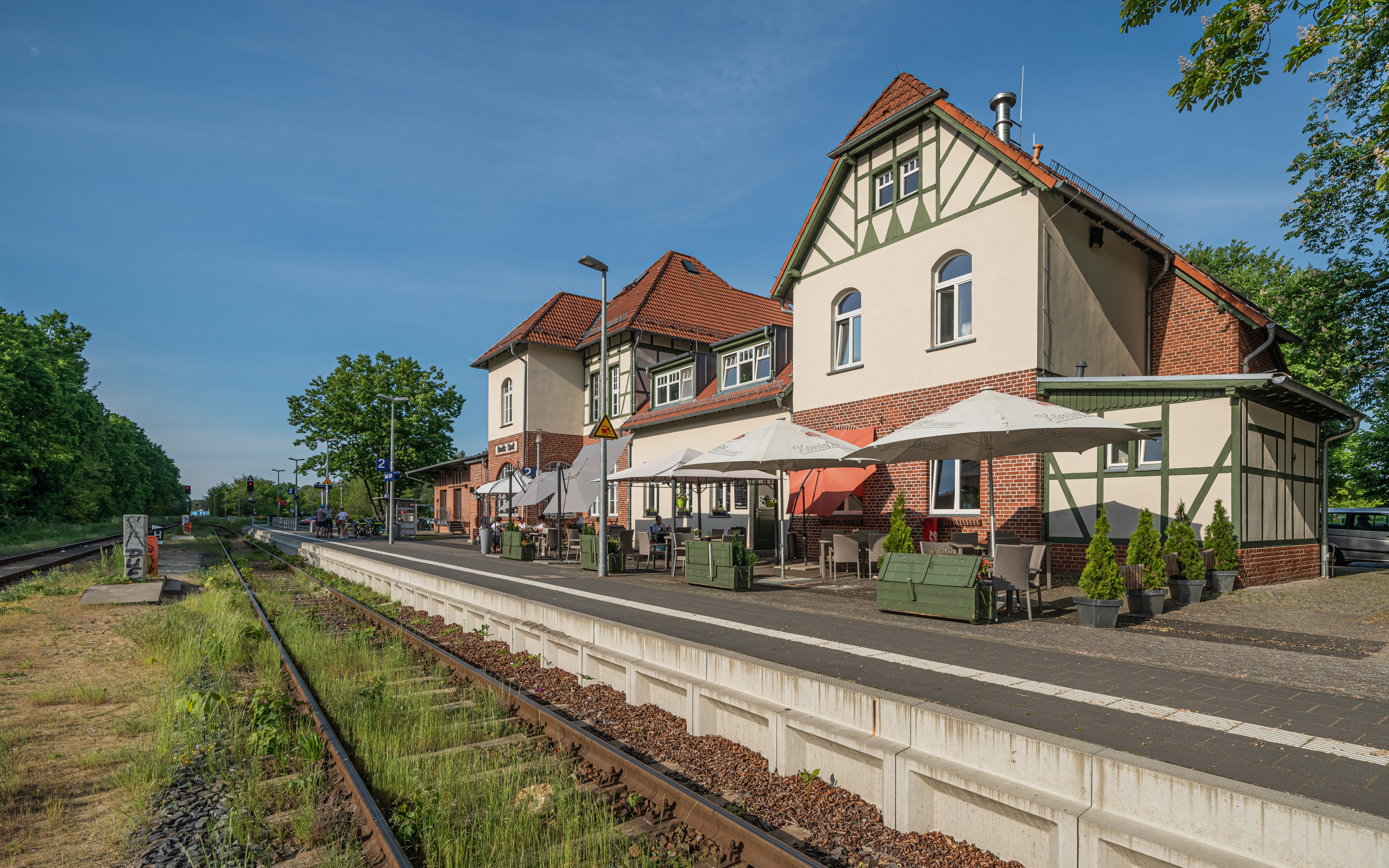
Beelitz Stadt station

At the turn of the 20th century, the railway network in Berlin increasingly developed into a bottleneck for the growing freight traffic. A bypass around the capital was considered for strategic military reasons. A line that had been opened from Jüterbog to Treuenbrietzen in 1894 was extended via Potsdam to Nauen on the Berlin–Hamburg Railway (Treuenbrietzen–Beelitz Stadt opened in 1904, Beelitz Stadt–Wildpark in 1908 and Wildpark–Nauen in 1902). Grade-separated junctions were built with the existing main lines north of Beelitz on the Berlin–Blankenheim railway, in Wustermark station on the Berlin–Lehrte railway and at Potsdam Wildpark Station (now Potsdam Park Sanssouci station) on the Berlin–Magdeburg railway. With the construction of the Wustermark shunting yard (Verschiebebahnhof Wustermark) on the Berlin–Lehrte railway east of its crossing of the freight bypass, it was connected by a two-track line branching off the line from Wildpark north of Priort and running to the east. In addition, the section from Wustermark to Nauen was duplicated for the construction of the shunting yard.

The extension from Nauen via Kremmen to Oranienburg (the Nauen–Oranienburg railway) was opened in 1915 during the First World War. In the course of the opening of the Seddin marshalling yard in the first half of the 1920s, connecting curves were built from it towards Ferch-Lienewitz and Beelitz Stadt. In the following years the network of the Berlin bypass railways were further developed with the construction of a connecting line from Seddin towards Großbeeren and the Outer Freight Ring (Güteraußenring).

Passenger services on the line mainly served local traffic.

After the Second World War and the division of Germany, the bypass of the West Berlin area had become particularly important for East Germany (GDR). Near Altes Lager station a connecting curve was built to the Anhalt Railway (Berlin–Halle railway) running south. It went into provisional operation on 20 March 1950 and was officially opened on 1 April. The volume of traffic on the line increased in subsequent years and in the mid-1950s it was also used by express trains from Saxony to the Baltic Sea. The Berlin outer ring (Berliner Außenring) was developed in the second half of the 1950s as an important bypass, which included the section of the Jüterbog–Nauen railway between Golm and Priort. Potsdam Süd (south) station was inaugurated in 1958 at the intersection of the Jüterbog–Nauen line and the outer ring in the woods west of Potsdam. A few years later it was renamed Potsdam Hauptbahnhof and it is now called Potsdam Pirschheide.

After the construction of the Berlin Wall and the closure of the Berlin–Hamburg railway at the border in December 1961, Berlin–Hamburg trains used the section of the line between Wustermark and Nauen, which was known as the Bredower Kurve (Bredow curve). The line was an important supplementary route for freight transport, mainly running to/from the nearby Seddin marshalling yard. Occasionally, Transitzüge (transit trains that ran non-stop between West Berlin and West Germany) diverted via this route.

== Developments in recent years ==
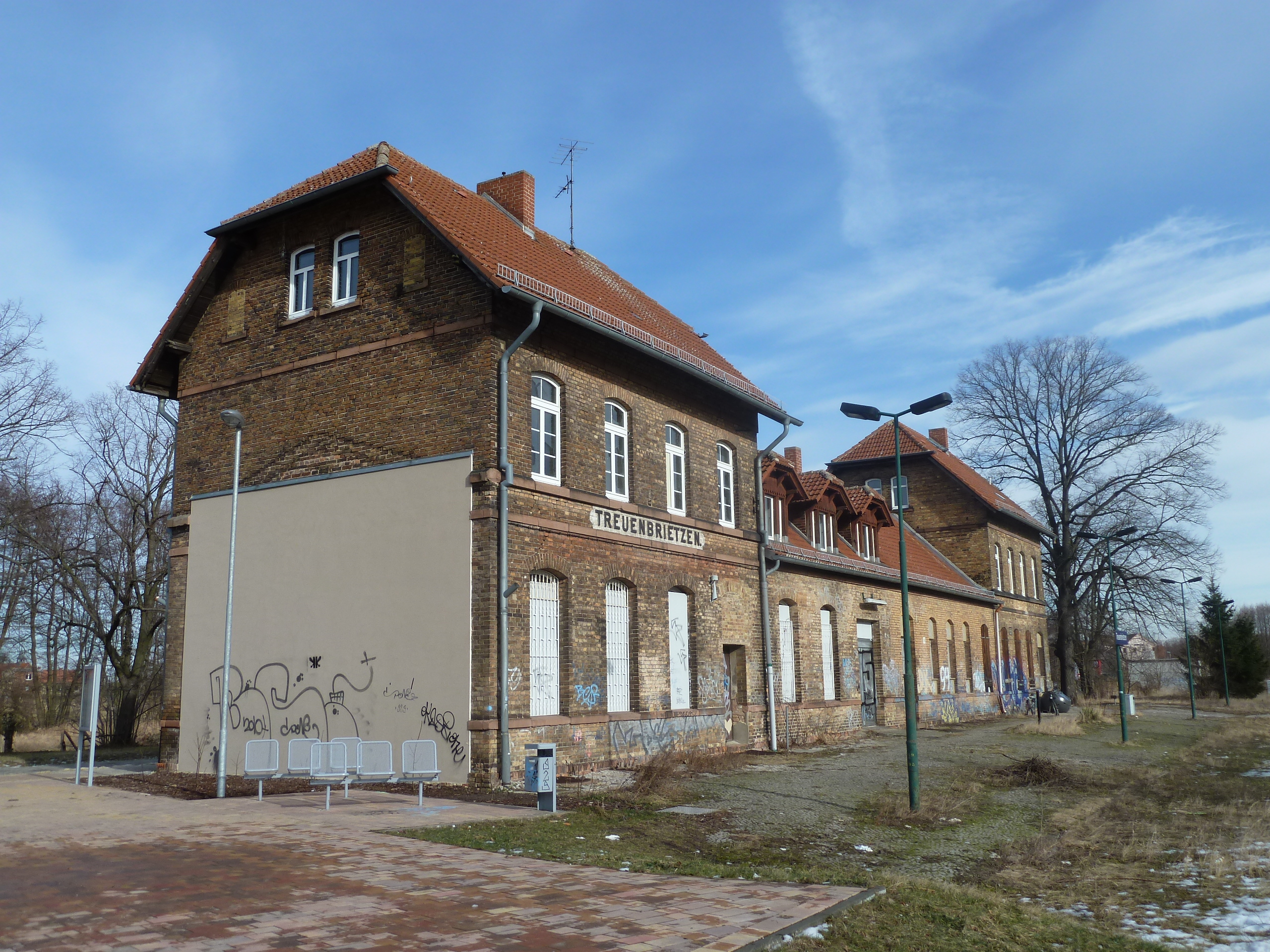
Heritage listed station building at Treuenbrietzen, 2012

On 30 April 1996, the Wustermark–Bredow–Nauen section was closed following the reopening of the direct Berlin–Hamburg line to Berlin.

The Regionalbahn RB21 service now runs every one to two hours on the Wustermark–Golm–Potsdam section and the section of the line that is now part of the outer ring is also used by the RB20 service and dense freight traffic. The passenger service between Wildpark (now Potsdam Sanssouci Park) and Potsdam Pirschheide was abandoned in 1994; instead trains now run to Potsdam Hauptbahnhof.

In 1998, the bridge of the freight bypass over the Berlin–Blankenheim railway at Beelitz was closed. Instead of through trains from Potsdam to Jüterbog, trains subsequently ran between Potsdam and Ferch-Lienewitz and via Michendorf to Berlin-Schönefeld as the RB22 service.

Beelitz Stadt, Treuenbrietzen and Jüterbog have since been served by the RB33 service from Berlin-Wannsee via Michendorf. After 2000, there was an attempt to abandon passenger services on the section between Beelitz Stadt and Jüterbog, which has relatively weak demand, but instead this line was upgraded for 100 km/h operations in 2006/07. The attractiveness of the service has increased due to the shorter travel time and better connections in Berlin-Wannsee and, since the end of 2007, in Jüterbog. The contract for the operation of the RB33 service was awarded to Veolia Verkehr and its subsidiary Ostseeland Verkehr (OLA) at the timetable change in December 2007, initially for two years, following an expressions of interest process. The line was operated under the brand name of Märkischen Regiobahn (MR33) with Siemens Desiro Classic diesel multiple units. From Monday to Friday there were approximately hourly services between Beelitz Stadt and Berlin-Wannsee.

With the timetable change in December 2011, Ostdeutsche Eisenbahn (ODEG) took over operation of the Berlin-Wannsee–Jüterbog route. Class 646 (Stadler GTW) articulated railcars are used on the service, which was designated as OE33. Trains run over the whole line at hourly intervals from Monday to Friday, crossing in Treuenbrietzen, and every two hours on weekends. Also since December 2011, the RB 22 service has operated directly over the Berlin outer ring in preparation for the much-delayed opening of the Berlin Brandenburg Airport. The RB 23 (Potsdam Hauptbahnhof–Michendorf) service now runs on the Jüterbog–Nauen railway in the Caputh area.

At the timetable change on 9 December 2012, the line numbers were standardised, so that the designation of the OE33 service was changed to RB33.

Various buildings standing next to line are heritage-listed: the stations buildings of Potsdam Sanssouci Park and Jüterbog, which were originally built for other lines, the station buildings in Tiefenbrunnen, Treuenbrietzen, Buchholz (Zauche) and Caputh-Geltow and a signalman's house in Priort.
