= Großbeeren station =

Railway station in Großbeeren, Brandenburg state, Germany

Großbeeren
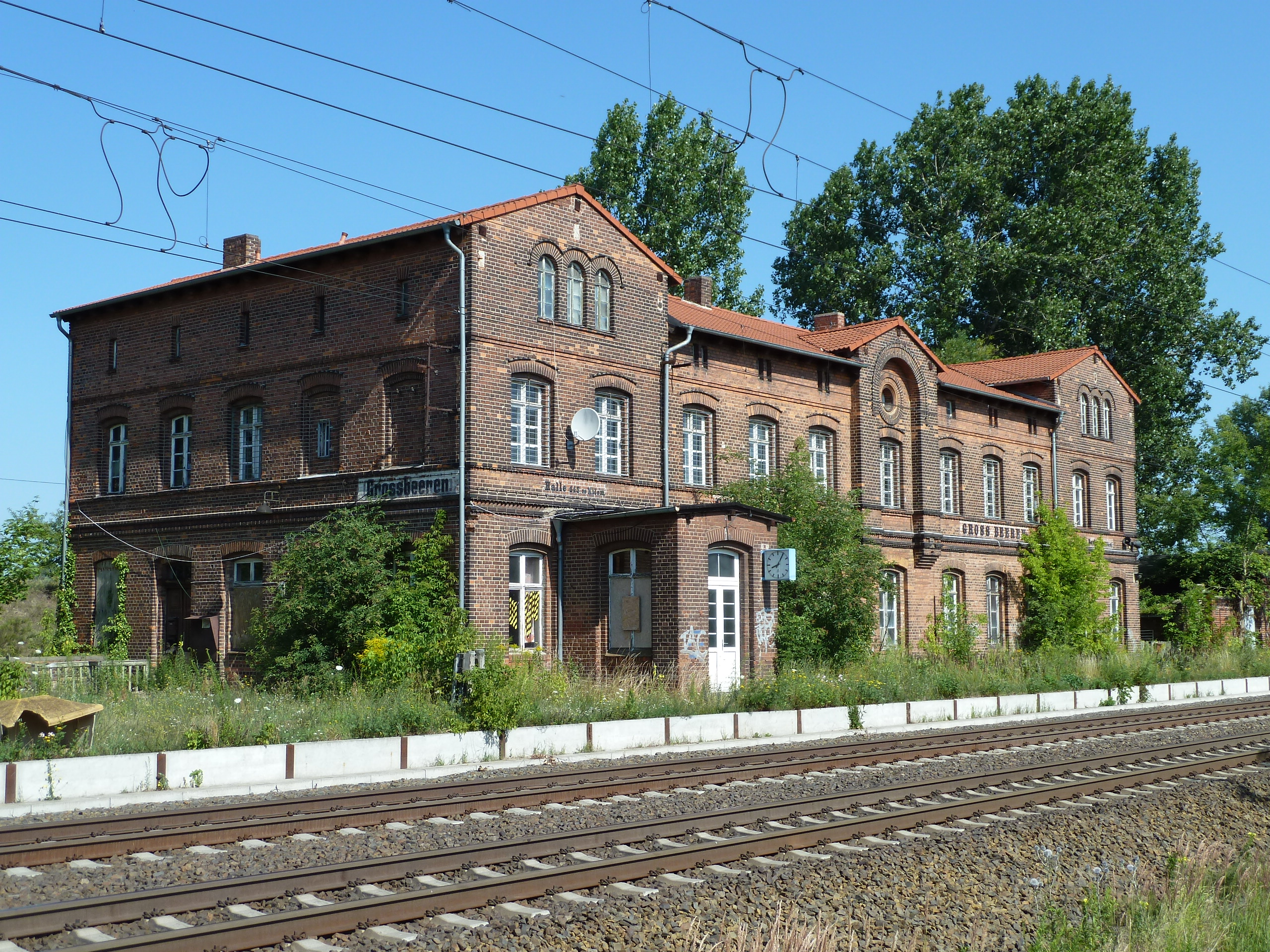
- Heritage-listed station building

General information
- Location: Am Bahnhof 6, Großbeeren, Brandenburg; Germany
- Coordinates: 52°21′03″N 13°17′05″E
- Line: Anhalt Railway
- Platforms: 2
- Tracks: 3

Construction
- Accessible: Platform 1 only

Other information
- Station code: 2325
- DS100 code: BGSB
- IBNR: 8011740
- Category: 7
- Fare zone: VBB: Berlin C/5954
- Website: www.bahnhof.de

History
- Opened: 16 October 1841

Services
Preceding station	Ostdeutsche Eisenbahn	Following station
Teltow towards Rathenow	RE 4	Birkengrund towards Falkenberg (Elster)
Location

Großbeeren station is a station in the town of Großbeeren on the Anhalt Railway south of Berlin. The station, which was inaugurated in 1841, is one of the oldest railway stations in the state of Brandenburg. The now disused station building is a listed building.

== Location ==
The station is located south of Berlin on the Berlin–Halle railway about two kilometres west of Großbeeren. It is connected by connecting curves to the Berlin Outer Ring. Federal highway 101 and the Berliner Ring run nearby.

== History ==
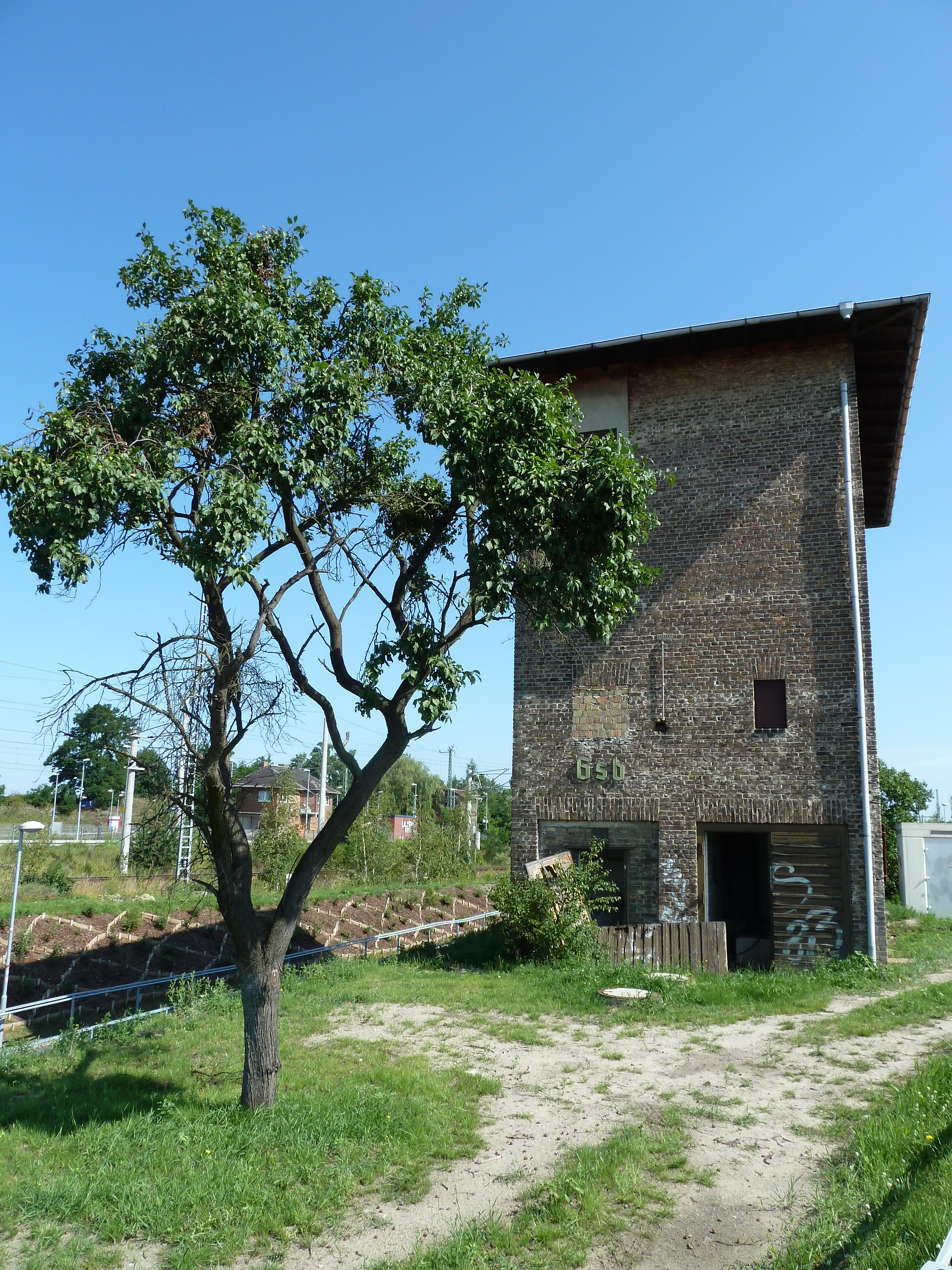
Signal box built in about 1940

At the establishment of the Anhalt line, Großbeeren was only a stop for steam locomotives so that they could be resupplied with water. However, from the beginning there was interest in establishing a stop for passengers.

Just a few months after the opening of the line, Großbeeren station was put into operation on 16 October 1841. Before that, on 29 August, there had been special services there to mark the anniversary of the Battle of Großbeeren. The station opened at the same time as the start of freight operations on the line. In the early years the nearby Ludwigsfelde station, which was opened at the same time as Großbeeren, was served during the day by just one freight train that also carried passengers; it could be used to travel to Berlin in the morning and to return in the afternoon. In 1849, Großbeeren was initially only served in the summer timetable, but soon passenger trains were stopping throughout the year. Initially, the station was called Großbeeren, although for several decades from the later 1840s the name was written as Groß-Beeren.

The original station building was south of the road to Neubeeren. In 1868, the large station building that still exists was built to the north of the road, but like its predecessor it was built on the west side away from the tracks and sidings. The original building was preserved as a residence and was probably demolished during the construction of additional tracks in 1940.

For the extension of the railway station in 1867–68, part of the Großbeeren estate had to be expropriated because its owner, von Briesen, had refused to sell the land. Previously he had been listed as an opponent of the railway.

On 1 December 1926, as part of the development of the Bypass Railway, the Michendorf–Großbeeren railway was opened, connecting the Berlin–Halle railway to the Seddin marshalling yard. Plans to extend the Bypass Railway from Großbeeren to the east were not realised initially.

=== Reconstruction around 1940 ===
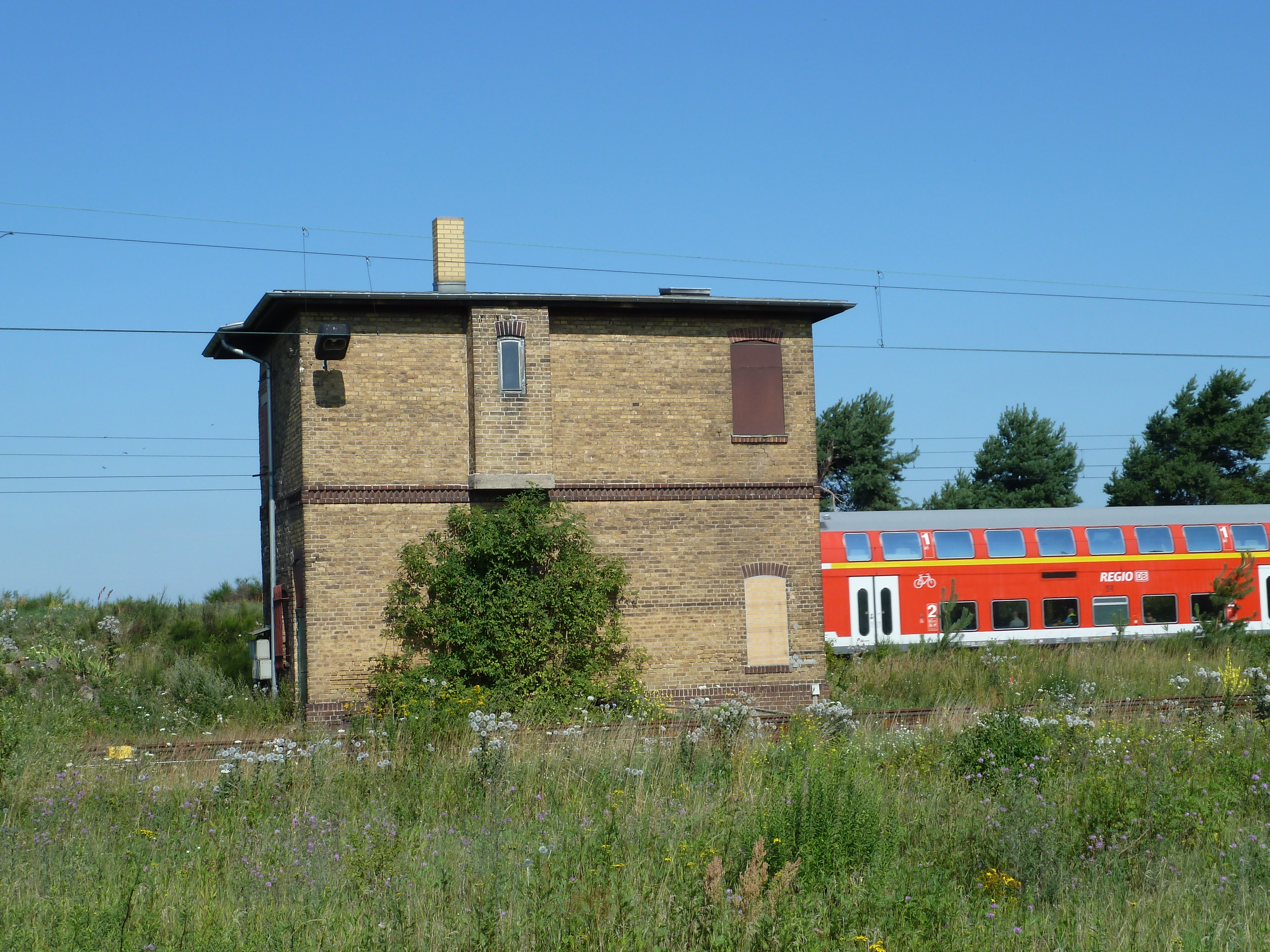
Former signal box in the marshalling yard

After the coming to power of the Nazis, the government planned as part of the planning for the World Capital Germania, a great transformation of the railways in the Berlin area. Components of this project included a large marshalling yard at Großbeeren and new links for freight from there to the northeast (the Outer Freight Ring—Güteraußenring) and to the southeast to the Dresden railway near Zossen. These projects were delayed by the outbreak of war and only small parts of them were built. The marshalling yard was opened on a much reduced scale on 15 August 1941 as Hilfsrangierbahnhof (auxiliary marshalling yard) Großbeeren; the Outer Freight Ring was also provisional opened on 16 December 1940 with a single track as the Vorläufiger Güteraußenring (interim outer freight ring). Only some preliminary construction of the planned line towards Zossen was completed in 1940. Other projects in the area of Großbeeren were a locomotive depot (Bahnbetriebswerk), a local freight yard and a line to the west as an extension of the Outer Freight Ring via Seehof and Stahnsdorf to Potsdam with access to Großbeeren marshalling yard.

In order to relieve the Anhalt railway of freight, a freight line was planned to be built parallel with it to Tempelhof marshalling yard. First, a construction track was built, which was later used for regular freight operations. The infrastructure of the marshalling yard was extended to the east of the Anhalt Railway for five kilometres as far as Teltow station.

For passenger operations, the largest transformations were planned in the area of Großbeeren. Among other things, local and long-distance traffic would be separated. New tracks were opened in 1943 to the west of the station for the Anhalt Suburban Line running on an embankment, which were provided with temporary platforms. The original plans envisaged an extension of the Berlin S-Bahn to Ludwigsfelde. This, however, did not eventuate and the S-Bahn was extended only as far as Lichterfelde Süd.

=== After the Second World War ===
After the war, the tracks of the auxiliary marshalling yard and a number of other tracks were dismantled for war reparations. The Anhalt Railway was divided by the establishment of a border between West Berlin and East Germany. Until 1952, through trains ran from Berlin on the Anhalt Railway and until 1961 it was still possible to interchange between the S-Bahn and trains on the Anhalt Railway at Teltow station. Until 1951, local services used the suburban tracks of the 1940s, after that they changed in Großbeeren from the tracks originally built for the construction of rail infrastructure to the long-distance tracks of the Anhalt Railway towards Teltow. The tracks on the embankment west of the station were dismantled.

The construction of the Berlin Wall created a break in the line for a long time. Großbeeren and Teltow were only accessible from the south. From the early 1950s, long-distance passenger services and freight from Berlin to the Anhalt Railway used the Berlin Outer Ring and did not pass Großbeeren station. The section of the line that was still open to Teltow and passed through Großbeeren station was electrified on 30 July 1982.

=== Since German reunification ===
After fall of the Berlin Wall in 1989, the lines in the Berlin area were restored. The Anhalt Railway was substantially rebuilt. The Großbeeren intermodal freight depot (Güterverkehrszentrum, GVZ) has been built on parts of the site of the former rail yard since 1994; its transfer facility went into operation in September 1998. In the same year passenger services between Ludwigsfelde and Teltow via Großbeeren were discontinued because of construction work to restore the connection to Berlin. In 2006, the newly built line was restored for through traffic. Großbeeren station was reclassified as a halt during the establishment of the GVZ. New platforms were built further south at the small signal box of the former marshalling yard, replacing the old platforms at the station building.

=== Passenger services ===
In the first years of operation, Großbeeren was served each day in both directions by one freight train that had some passenger accommodation. In subsequent years, services gradually increased. In 1905, nine or ten passenger trains, depending on direction, stopped in the station, mostly running to Dresden, Leipzig and Halle. Express trains did stop in Großbeeren. By 1943, some of the long-distance passenger trains stopped in Großbeeren, others ran through. Of those terminating in Trebbin or Jüterbog, most stopped at the station. With the separation of the suburban services, Großbeeren was served from 1943 approximately every 30 minutes by suburban trains between Berlin and Ludwigsfelde, sometimes more frequently during the peak hour; trains on longer routes no longer stopped there. Passenger services towards Berlin ended in 1952 as the Berlin S-Bahn service had been extended to Teltow in 1951.

In 1961 with the establishment of the Berlin Wall, the importance of the station for passengers was reduced significantly. The service was usually limited to six or seven pairs of trains between Teltow and Ludwigsfelde via Großbeeren, some of which continued to Jüterbog. After the fall of the Wall the number of train services increased. In 1992, trains ran between Ludwigsfelde and Teltow every two hours and from 1993 they ran hourly. In 1998, passenger services stopped for the reconstruction of the line and were replaced by buses.

Since 2006, Großbeeren has had a direct hourly service to Berlin. Since the 2011/12 timetable, hourly services of the RE 4 Regional-Express service running from Rathenow via Berlin to Ludwigsfelde (during peak hour to Jüterbog) stop in Großbeeren. In the evenings, this service does not operate, but then RE 5 services stop in the station.

== Infrastructure ==
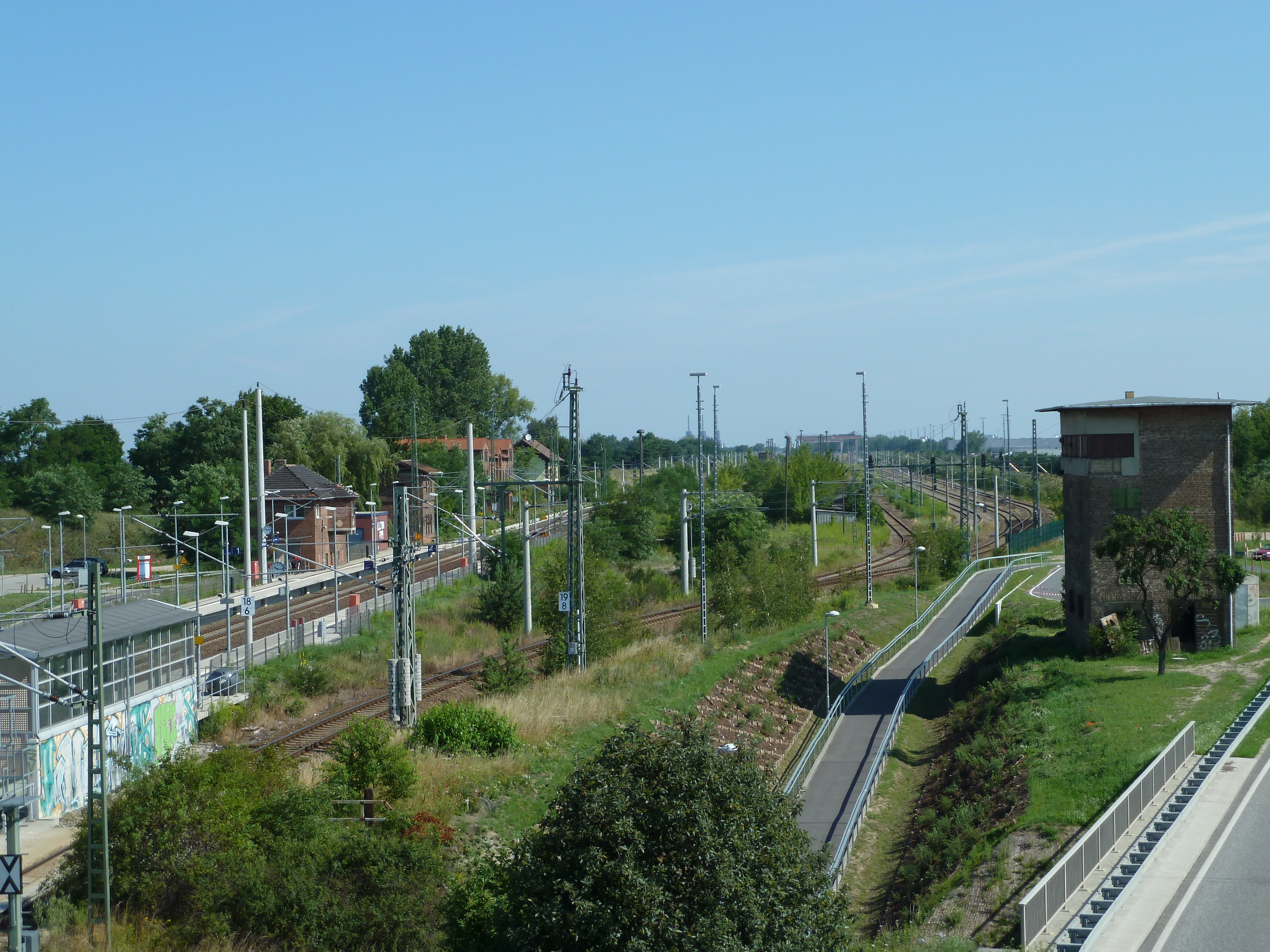
On the left: the new platforms and the old station building. Behind: the former embankment of the suburban railways in 1940. On the right: a former signal box and the tracks to the GVZ.

The station building of 1868 is located west of the tracks. It is no longer used and it is heritage-listed along with an outbuilding. Before the remodelling, the station had a platform next to the station building and an island platform, which was offset to the north. On the east side of the tracks, there were facilities for freight transport. For a short time in the 1940s there was a suburban platform on the west side of the station built on an embankment.

=== Current station and junction ===
The tracks of the old station are no longer used. A new station for passenger services has been built south of the station building, which is classified operationally as a halt (Haltepunkt, meaning that it has no sets of points). Großbeeren has two external platforms that are 140 m long and a height of 76 cm above the top of the rail. This is served hourly by Regional-Express service RE 4 (Rathenow–Berlin–Ludwigsfelde). In the evening peak hour, when the RE 4 is no longer running, Großbeeren is served by RE 5 services. South of the station is Großbeeren junction (official railway abbreviation: BGSBS). A branch runs off to the southwest over a connecting curve built in 2006 to Großbeeren West junction (BGBW), where a connecting loop built in the 1950s north from the former Genshagener Heide station connects to the Outer Ring in both directions. There is also a branch from Großbeeren Süd (south) junction to the northeast to the intermodal freight depot (GVZ), which passes to the east of the station. The old link from the Outer Ring to the east of the Anhalt Railway now leads directly to the GVZ.

=== Freight centre ===
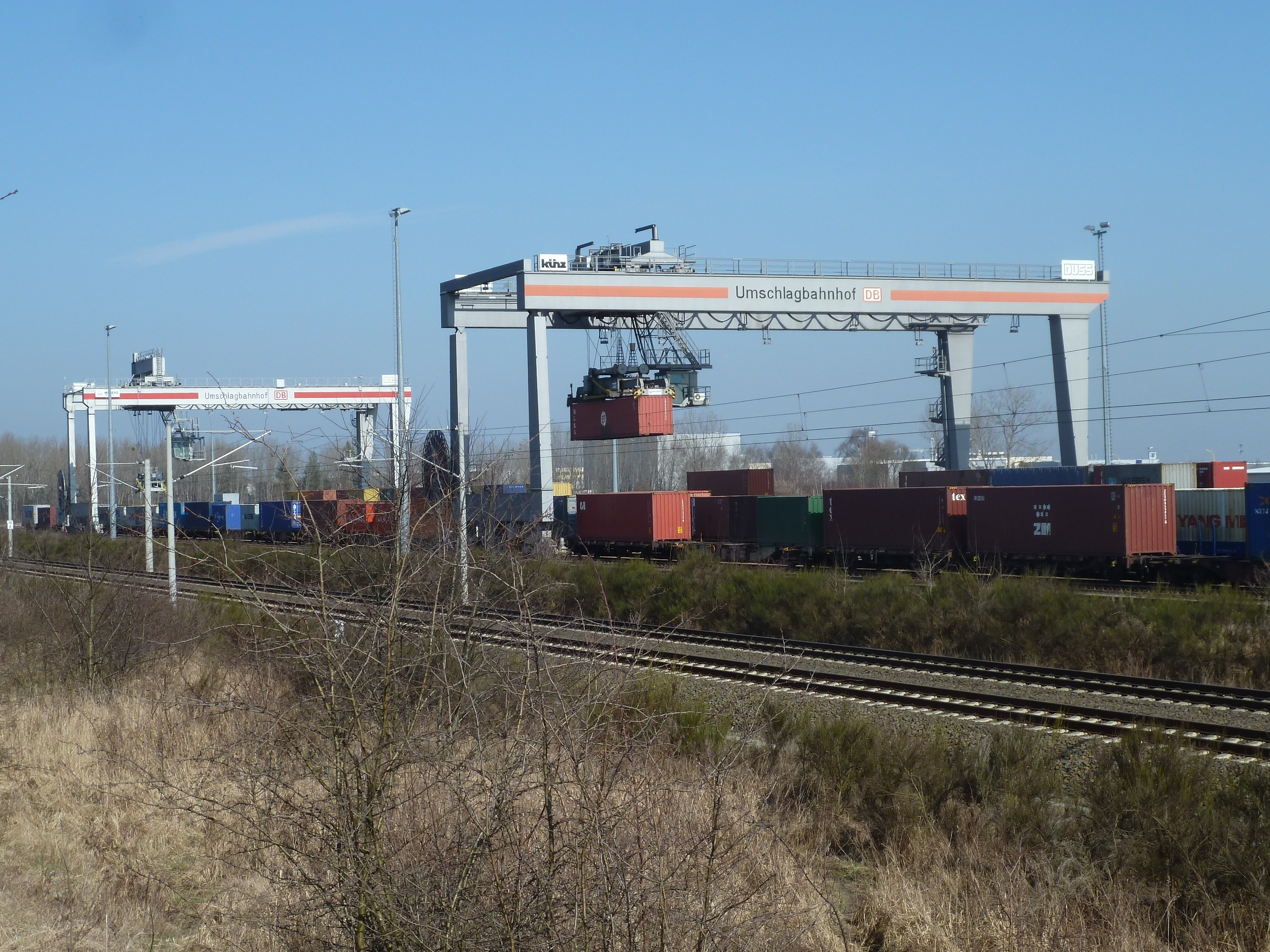
Intermodal freight centre

The Großbeeren intermodal freight centre (Güterverkehrszentrum, GVZ), which is of considerable importance for supplying Berlin, was built in 1998 and enlarged in 2005. Its terminal for combined transport is located east of the Anhalt Railway and consists of a container terminal with two gantry cranes, an access road for container trucks and a service centre for containers. There are two tracks with a usable length of 700 m and two tracks with a usable length of 350 m. Each year, up to 100,000 TEU can be handled at the centre. The operator is Deutsche Umschlaggesellschaft Schiene-Straße (DUSS), a Deutsche Bahn subsidiary.

Due to its high traffic, a 40-acre extension to the centre was completed in the "Am Lilograben" area to the west of the Anhalt Railway in 2014. To connect to the existing intermodal terminal, a road bridge was built over the railway line with funding from the European Regional Development Fund. Currently (as of 2014) 6,200 people work in the freight centre.
