= Wustermark station =

Railway station in Wustermark, Germany

Wustermark
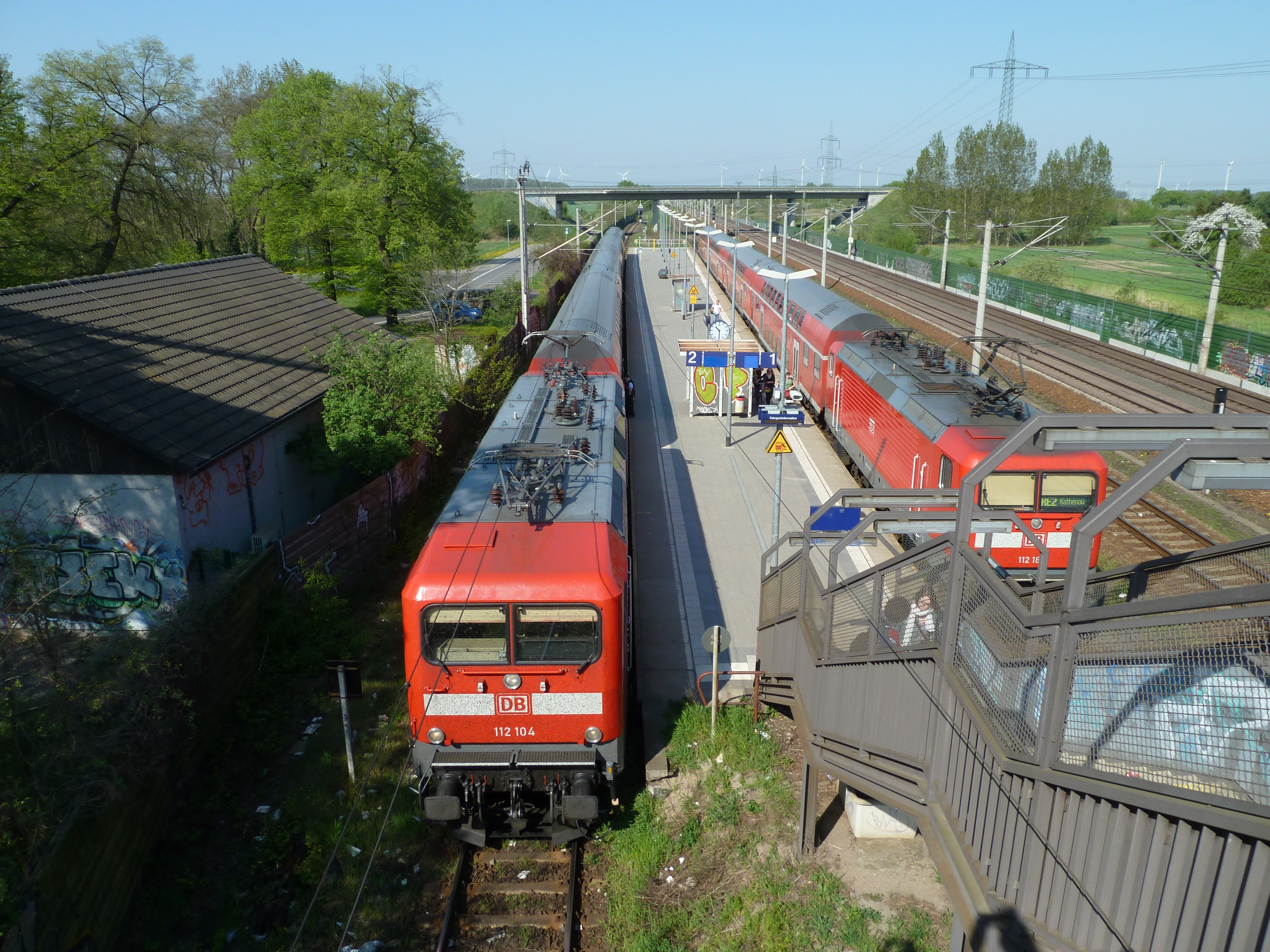
- Wustermark station

General information
- Location: Neue Bahnhofstraße, Wustermark, Brandenburg; Germany
- Coordinates: 52°33′05″N 12°56′43″E
- Lines: Berlin outer ring; Berlin–Lehrte railway (KBS 202); connecting to the Berlin outer ring; (Jüterbog)–Priort–Nauen
- Platforms: 2

Construction
- Accessible: Yes

Other information
- Station code: 6957
- DS100 code: BWUS
- Category: 5
- Fare zone: VBB: Berlin C/5448
- Website: www.bahnhof.de

History
- Opened: 1871

Passengers
- 51200

Services
Preceding station	DB Regio Nordost	Following station
Buschow towards Rathenow or Stendal Hbf	RE 4	Elstal towards Jüterbog or Falkenberg (Elster)
Priort towards Potsdam Hbf	RB 21	Elstal towards Berlin Gesundbrunnen
Location

Wustermark station is a railway station in the town of Wustermark in the Havelland region of the German state of Brandenburg, to the west of Berlin. The station is located on the Berlin–Lehrte railway and is connected with the Jüterbog–Nauen railway (originally built as part of a freight bypass), part of which became part of the Berlin outer ring in the 1950s. It is classified by Deutsche Bahn as a category 5 station.

== Location ==
The station is located at the km 30.5 of the Berlin–Lehrte railway on the northern outskirts of Wustermark, about 500 metres north of the centre of the town. About two kilometres to its east the Berlin outer ring crosses the Lehrte railway. Four kilometres to the east, beyond the outer ring, is the Wustermark marshalling yard (Rangierbahnhof), which is often colloquially referred to as "Wustermark", but it is not to be confused with Wustermark station.

== History ==
The station was opened in 1871 with the Lehrte railway. The section of the Jüterbog–Nauen railway from Nauen to Wildpark (part of an early freight bypass railway around Berlin), which used part of the Lehrte railway through Wustermark station, was opened in 1902, making the station into a small junction. The large Wustermark marshalling yard to the east of Wustermark went into operations in 1909. In order to cope with the traffic to the new yard, the Lehrte railway from Spandau to Wustermark was quadrupled and the railway between Wustermark and Nauen was duplicated as far as the Berlin–Hamburg Railway.

After the Second World War, passenger services on the Lehrte railway to West Berlin was first partially and later completely stopped. Both the Lehrte railway and the Jüterbog–Nauen railway were reduced to only one track to provide material for war reparations. A section of the Berlin outer ring, which was built as a ring around West Berlin, was built on a viaduct over the Lehrte Railway near the station in 1953 and the two lines were connected via connecting curves. Wustermark became a point for transferring between the passenger trains on the outer ring and the Lehrte railway. In 1983, the Berlin outer ring and the two branches from the ring to Wustermark station and the Wustermark marshalling yard were electrified. Subsequently, electric and diesel locomotives were exchanged at Wustermark station on express trains between Berlin and Stendal.

The section of the line between Wustermark and Nauen was electrified in 1993 and used for several years by long distance traffic between Berlin and Hamburg, as the direct route of the Berlin–Hamburg railway, which was broken by the building of the Berlin Wall in 1961, had still not been restored. After the reopening of the missing section of the Berlin–Hamburg line in 1995, passenger traffic between Wustermark and Nauen ended and the section of line was closed in 1996 and partially dismantled. In the second half of the 1990s the Lehrte railway was partially rebuilt as the Hanover–Berlin high-speed railway. As a result, Wustermark station was rebuilt. The earthworks of the line to Nauen were completely eliminated.

Today the station is primarily used for regional traffic towards Berlin, Rathenow and Potsdam.

=== Passenger services ===
The station was originally a passenger stop for trains on the Lehrte railway between Berlin, Rathenow and Stendal. Express and semi-fast trains did not stop at the station. In 1905 the station was served by seven pairs of passenger trains which usually ran from Berlin to Hanover stopping at all or almost all stations.

After the First World War a denser suburban service was introduced between Berlin and Wustermark with trains on this section running about every half-hour. In addition, through passenger trains between Berlin and Rathenow stopped at the station. Since 1921, Berlin suburban fares have extended to Wustermark.

Suburban trains were not restored at the end of the Second World War. The rail service to Berlin was interrupted in Staaken at the city limits, but until the construction of the Berlin Wall in 1961 it was still possible to change to the Berlin S-Bahn. After the construction of the Wall, Wustermark became a transfer point for tourist traffic towards East Berlin. Train services from 1960 to 1990 continued to be approximately constant. For example, the 1985/86 timetable was as follows:

Train class	Route	Frequency
Express	Stendal – Rathenow – Wustermark – Potsdam Hauptbahnhof – Flughafen Berlin-Schönefeld – Berlin-Schöneweide	3 pairs daily
Local	(Stendal) – Rathenow – Wustermark – Wustermark Rangierbahnhof	11 pairs daily
Local	Nauen – Wustermark – Priort – Potsdam Hauptbahnhof (or Potsdam Stadt)	Nauen – Wustermark ca. 15 pairs daily (some to Staaken); Wustermark – Priort 5–7 pairs daily, some with change in Priort
Local	Falkenhagen (Kr Nauen) – Wustermark – Wustermark Rangierbahnhof – Staaken	approximately every hour

After German reunification in 1990, direct services to West Berlin were resumed. From 1991 a service ran between Nauen and Berlin, which stopped at Wustermark station every two hours. There was also a service between Nauen and Potsdam, also running every two hours, and some services each day to Rathenow. The express service from Berlin on the Lehrte Railway was also resumed, but the trains passed through Wustermark station without stopping. Services towards the northern half of the Berlin outer ring were abandoned.

Construction began on the Hanover–Berlin high-speed railway in 1995. During its construction, passenger services was suspended towards Rathenow and Nauen and replaced by buses running every two hours towards Berlin from December 1995. Passenger services on the Lehrte Railway were resumed in 1998 and services to Nauen were permanently discontinued. The station is served by the following services as of 2026:

Service	Route	Frequency
RE 4	(Stendal –) Rathenow – Wustermark – Dallgow-Döberitz – Berlin Jungfernheide – Berlin Südkreuz – Ludwigsfelde – Jüterbog (– Falkenberg)	Hourly
RB 21	Berlin Gesundbrunnen – Berlin Jungfernheide – Berlin-Spandau – Dallgow-Döberitz – Wustermark – Priort – Golm – Potsdam Park Sanssouci– Potsdam Hbf	Hourly

== Infrastructure ==
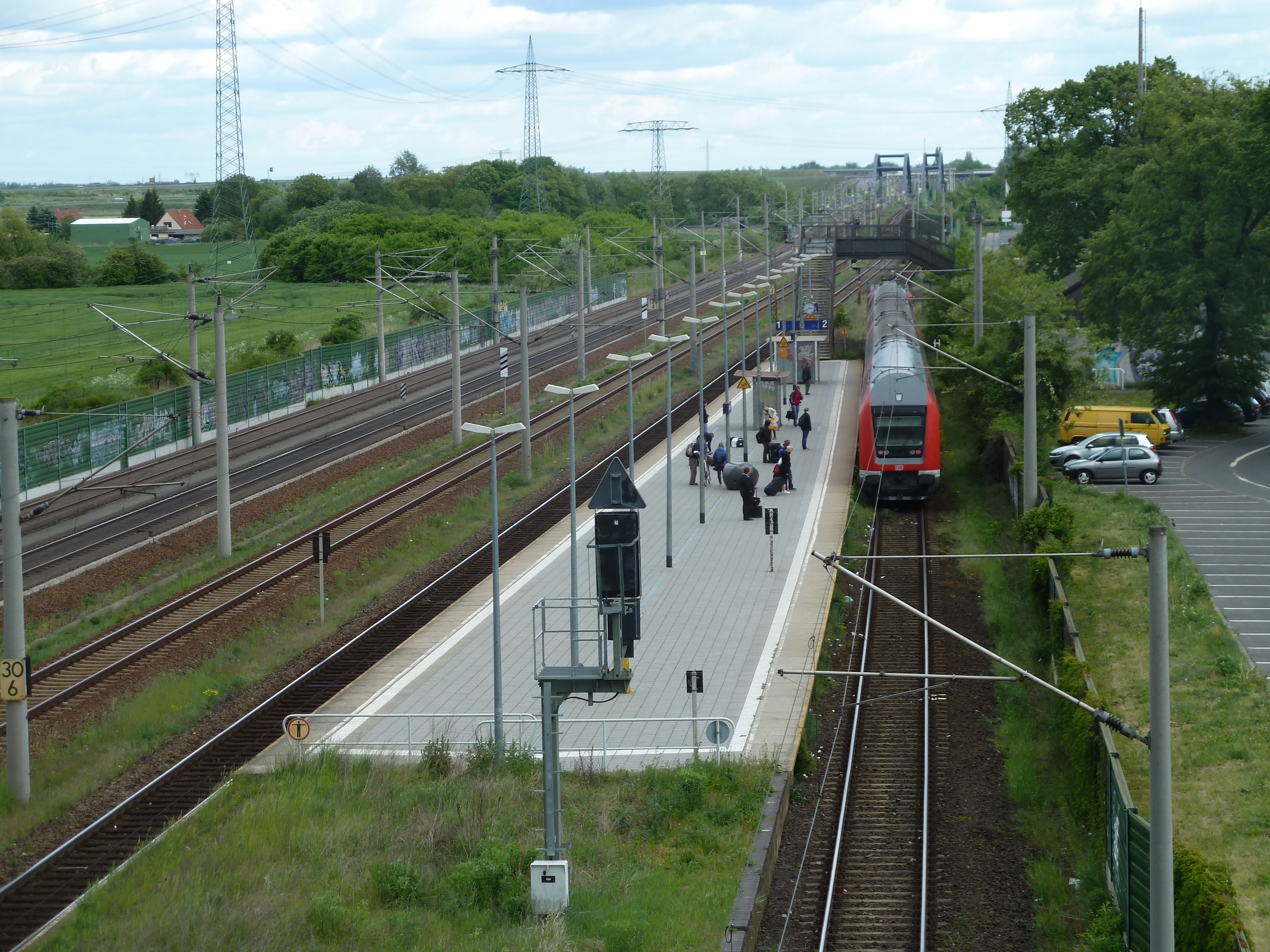
View of the facilities of the station from the bridge of Bundesstraße 5

The station building on the Lehrte Railway was south of the tracks. The line from Nauen that opened in 1902 passed under the Lehrte Railway about two kilometres east of the station and then ran parallel with it to Wustermark station; the junction between two lines was originally in the eastern part of the station. After the Second World War, a connecting curve was built from the Nauen line towards Rathenow. The Berlin outer ring built in 1953/54 had both northbound and southbound connecting curves to/from Wustermark. East of the platform on the Lehrte Railway were tracks for local freight traffic. The Nauen line had a separate platform on the northern side of the tracks which was connected by a pedestrian bridge. Immediately afterwards, the Nauen line separated from the Lehrte Railway towards Nauen. Thus, while the platform of the Lehrte Railway was to the west of the bridge, the platform on the Nauen line was to the east of it.

With the construction of the high-speed line after 1995, the station was completely rebuilt and the infrastructure of the bypass railway including the link towards Nauen were demolished. The connection to the outer ring to the north was also taken out of use and dismantled.

Today the station is located on the original tracks of the Lehrte Railway and consists of an island platform with two tracks; it also has a through track without a platform. To the north lies the double-track of the high-speed line. West of the station there is a connection between the old tracks and the high-speed line. The Regional-Express services stopping at Wustermark station change tracks on to the high-speed line, since the old line is not electrified west of Wustermark. East of the station, the old line is single track to the Havel Canal out and then branches to form two separate parallel tracks towards Wustermark marshalling yard and has a connection to the outer ring running south.

The platform can be reached via a pedestrian bridge from the forecourt to the south of the tracks, but it no longer has a station building.

At the end of 2013, two lifts were put into operation on the pedestrian bridge so that the platform is accessible for the disabled. The construction cost of around €1 million was mainly financed from the federal infrastructure acceleration program.

== See also ==
- List of railway stations in Brandenburg
