= Berlin outer ring =

Railway line in Germany

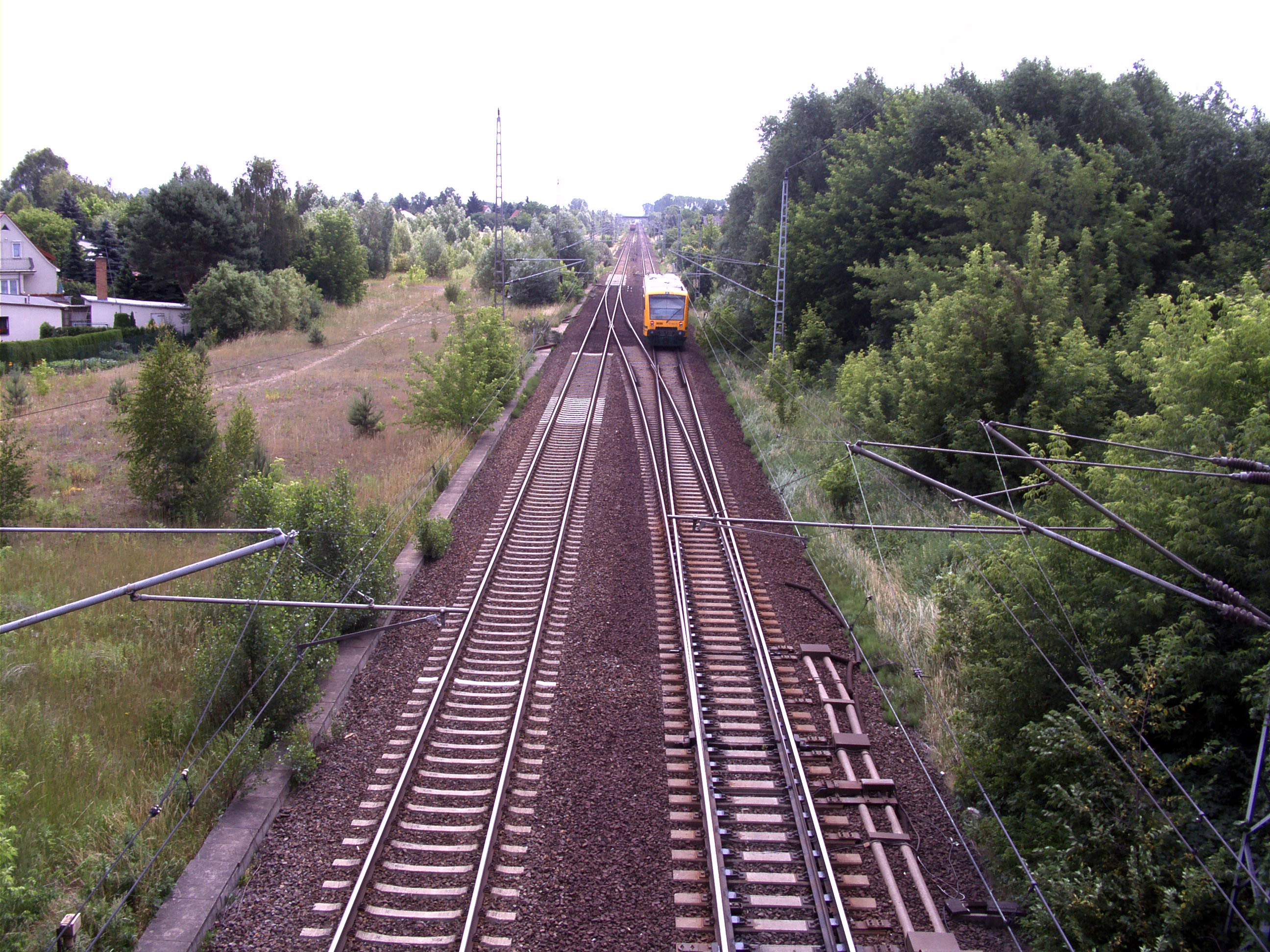
- The outer ring near Sellheimbrücke, on the left is the route of the planned S-Bahn

Overview
- Native name: Berliner Außenring
- Line number: 6126 Saarmund–Eichgestell; 6080 Eichgestell–Biesdorfer Kreuz; 6067 Biesdorfer Kreuz–Karower Kreuz; 6087 Karower Kreuz–Priort; 6068 Priort–Golm; 6116 Golm–Saarmund; 6011 Biesdorfer Kreuz–Springpfuhl (S-Bahn); 6012 Springpfuhl–Wartenberg (S-Bahn); 6009 Karower Kreuz–Bergfelde (S-Bahn)
- Locale: Berlin, Brandenburg, Germany

Service
- Route number: 207, 209.12, 209.20, 209.21, 209.22

Technical
- Line length: 125 km (78 mi)
- Track gauge: 1,435 mm (4 ft 8 1/2 in) standard gauge
- Electrification: S-Bahn: 750 V third rail; main line: 15 kV/16.7 Hz AC overhead catenary
- Operating speed: 160 km/h (99.4 mph) (maximum)

The Berlin outer ring (BAR; German: Berliner Außenring) is a 125 km (78 mi) long double track electrified railway located in Berlin and Brandenburg, Germany. Its route forms a ring around the former West Berlin, and includes parts of some older lines such as the Outer Freight Ring, Jüterbog–Nauen railway, and Michendorf–Großbeeren railway.

The BAR was originally built by the German Democratic Republic (East Germany) between 1950 and 1961 to bypass West Berlin for political, economic, and military reasons. It allowed East Germany to seal off West Berlin without disrupting its transport links, in preparation for the building of the Berlin Wall during the division of Germany, by encircling West Berlin through East Berlin and the suburbs in Bezirk Potsdam. The BAR was integrated into the Deutsche Bahn railway system in the 1990s after German reunification.

The term Outer ring is used to distinguish the line from the Ringbahn of inner Berlin.

== Route ==
Starting at the Anhalt line in the south, the outer ring runs from Genshagener Heide to Schönefeld Airport, Grünau Cross, Wuhlheide, Schönfließ, Golm, Potsdam Pirschheide, Saarmund, and back to Genshagener Heide.

== History ==
In the late 19th century the military sought an outer connection between the railway lines radiating out of Berlin. Such a line also had advantages for freight traffic. In 1902, the Bypass Railway (Umgehungsbahn) was opened connecting the Magdeburg railway, the Lehrte Railway and the Hamburg Railway between Wildpark station (now Potsdam Park Sanssouci station) via Wustermark and Nauen. In the following years, the line was extended to Jüterbog on the Anhalt line and Oranienburg on the Prussian Northern line. In the 1920s, the Seddin marshalling yard was built on the Berlin-Blankenheim line and subsequently connected via Saarmund to Großbeeren on the Anhalt line. In the early 1930s a continuation of this link to the east via Schönefeld to Wuhlheide was planned, which would have approximated the route of the current outer ring. During the Nazi period the Berlin Outer Freight Ring (Güteraußenring) was built in 1940/1941 to create a provisional connection from Teltow on the Anhalt line via Schönefeld to eastern Berlin, linking with the Stettin Railway at Berlin-Karow. It was significantly closer to Berlin’s southern outskirts that the previous plan and the current outer ring.

The division of Germany and Berlin after World War II caused the Soviet zone administration and later the East German government to build an efficient bypass of West Berlin. The first steps were the construction in 1948 of connecting curves to the outer freight ring between Werder and Golm and between the Berlin–Görlitz line and the north at Berlin-Grünau. In 1950, a connection was built at Berlin-Karow to link with Basdorf on the Heidekraut Railway, connecting with the Northern Railway via Wensickendorf to Oranienburg.

=== Construction of the outer ring ===
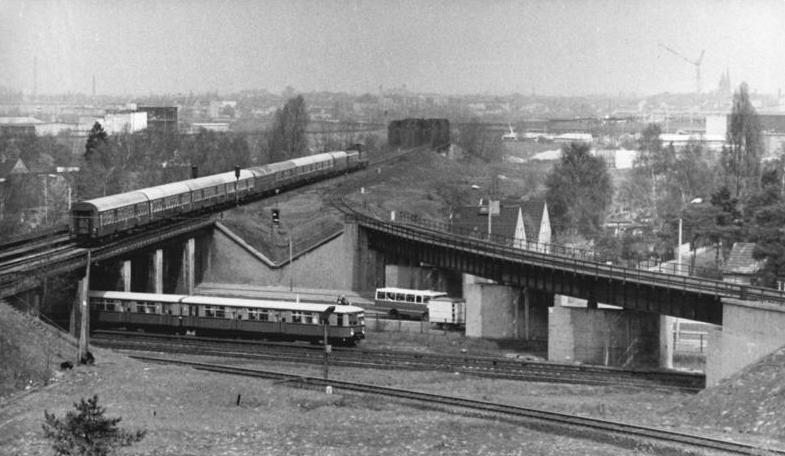
Grunau Cross in 1980

On 8 July 1951, the section between Genshagener Heide and Schönefeld was opened along with the connecting curves between Genshagener Heide east and Ludwigsfelde and between Glasower Damm east and Blankenfelde. This was followed by the opening of the Schönefeld–Grünau Cross section on 12 August 1951 and its extension to Wendenheide on 2 December of that year. On 22 November 1952 the opening of the section from the Outer freight ring at today’s Karow cross and Bergfelde and the connecting curve from Bergfelde junction to Birkenwerder. The next steps were the opening of the connecting curve from Karow West junction to Blankenburg (1953), the Wuhlheide marshalling yard (1 October 1953) and, simultaneously, the section from Bergfelde to Falkenhagen and Brieselang, initially as a single track. This was followed between 1953 and 1955 with the opening of a connection curve between Karow west junction and Karow north junction, the doubling of the former Brandenburg Ring line between Saarmund and Genshagener Heide, and the opening of several connecting curves: between Hennigsdorf west junction and Hennigsdorf, Hennigsdorf east and Hennigsdorf, between Hohen Neuendorf west and Birkenwerder and between Falkenhagen and Finkenkrug and Brieselang. On 2 October 1955, the section between Falkenhagen junction and Wustermark was opened along with the connection curves to Wustermark freight yard and Wustermark. On 11 December 1955 the line from Wustermark Junction to Elstal Junction was opened, completing the connection with the Brandenburg Ring line between Golm and Elstal.

The last section of the line was the difficult section between Saarmund and Golm across the Templiner See. On 30 September 1956, the connecting curve between Potsdam south and Werder was opened to traffic, completing the ring. This was followed by several connecting curves: Nesselgrund east to Wilhelmshorst and Golm to Wildpark (28 September 1957), Genshagener Heide to Birkengrund (north-west curve, 1 June 1958), Werder to Golm (6 February 1959) and finally Glasower Damm - Blankenfelde (south-west curve, 25 May 1961).

In 1958, passenger trains began running on the outer ring as part of the Berlin S-Bahn fare scheme. As this followed the launch of the first Soviet satellite, these trains, which ran partly on a circular orbit around West Berlin, were commonly called "Sputniks”.

=== Further upgrades ===
On 13 August 1961, the Berlin Wall was built closing East Germany’s border with West Berlin. This made necessary the construction of an S-Bahn connection between Berlin-Blankenburg and Hohen Neuendorf towards Oranienburg. In 1962 separate S-Bahn tracks between Schönfließ and Bergfelde were put into operation (on the rest of the section S-Bahn and mainline trains shared tracks) and the connection between Bergfelde/Bergfelde East and Birkenwerder were built. Also in 1962 an S-Bahn line from Adlershof station to Berlin-Schoenefeld Airport was opened and this line also made available for long-distance trains. Previously, it had served only as a station for border checkpoint purposes.

In the same year track was completed on the connection between Hasselberg and Brieselang, and the Hennigsdorf–Wustermark section were electrified experimentally with the 25 kV/50 Hz system. Class E 251 locomotives built in the Lokomotivbau Elektrotechnische Werke in Hennigsdorf (now owned by Bombardier) were used on the line. In 1973, the catenary was removed, although some masts were preserved and reused for the 15 kV electrification in 1983.

In 1982, the Saarmund–Glasower Damm section and the connection to Blankenfelde was electrified, including the Saarmund–Michendorf connecting line and the Genshagen Heath/Genshagen Heath east–Ludwigsfelde curves as well as the Priort–Saarmund section. In 1983 this was followed by the electrification of several sections: Wustermark/Wustermark marshalling yard–Priort, Berlin-Schönefeld Airport–Grünau Cross, Birkenwerder junction (near Hohen Neuendorf West)–Wustermark South junction as well as the connecting curves at Golm/Wildpark west junction–Werder, Wustermark north junction–Wustermark marshalling yard/Wustermark and Falkenhagener cross.

On 17 May 1983, the third track—and on 26 September 1986 the fourth track—was opened between Glasower Damm junction and Berlin-Schönefeld Airport. Between Karow Cross and Schönfließ two separate tracks were brought into operation on 2 September 1984 as part of the planned electrification of long-distance tracks.

As a result of the decline in freight traffic after German reunification, the Wuhlheide marshalling yard was decommissioned on 10 June 1994 and later abandoned completely.

With the opening of the North-South mainline on 28 May 2006, its southern connection to the Anhalt Railway was re-opened, but not to the Dresden line. Since then, trains to Dresden have run on the outer ring between Genshagener Cross and Glasower Damm. These trains use a connecting curve from the direction of Teltow and Berlin and use a newly built curve.

As part of the western rail link to Berlin-Brandenburg International Airport, the third and fourth tracks between Glasower Damm east junction and Berlin-Schönefeld Airport station were taken out of service in early 2008. From Schönefeld, the route of the new S-Bahn to the airport lies on the subgrade of these tracks up to the vicinity of Waßmannsdorf, There, the S-Bahn leaves the outer ring and runs in a semicircular curve to the long-distance railway tracks. These branch off at grade from the outer ring to the east at the new Selchow junction east of Glasower Damm. The S-Bahn and long-distance trains then reach the airport station in parallel from the west. A total of 15 km (9.3 mi) of new track were built for long-distance and regional traffic and 8 km (5.0 mi) for the S-Bahn. The S-Bahn line from Schönefeld to Berlin Brandenburg station and the long-distance line from Glasower Damm Ost via the airport station to the Görlitzer Bahn were put into operation on 30 October 2011, but were not used for public transport for a long time due to delays in the construction of BER airport.

With the timetable change on 9 December 2012, Genshagener Heide station (near Ludwigsfelde) was closed for passenger traffic, and the new Ludwigsfelde-Struveshof station, located 2 km (1.2 mi) further west, with two 140 m (460 ft)-long side platforms, was put into operation. In 2013, the station was completed with a pedestrian bridge and a park and ride area. This work cost a total of €3.9 million.

In November 2019, the electronic interlocking for the S-Bahn area went into operation at the Biesdorfer Kreuz, as did the equipping of the S-Bahn line between Biesdorfer Kreuz and Wartenberg with the Zugbeeinflussungssystem S-Bahn Berlin (ZBS) train control system. A similar interlocking for the long-distance tracks followed at the beginning of 2021.

== Passenger services ==
There is no passenger service around the entirety of the outer ring, but a number of services serve it in part.

Route	Stations served	Frequency
RE 6	Berlin Gesundbrunnen – Spandau – Falkensee – Hennigsdorf – Pritzwalk – Wittenberge	Peaks only
RE 7	Dessau – Belzig – Wannsee – Berlin Hbf – Berlin Ostbahnhof – Königs Wusterhausen – Senftenberg	Hourly
RB 12	Lichtenberg – Hohenschönhausen – Oranienburg – Templin Stadt	Hourly
RB 20	Potsdam – Golm – Hennigsdorf – Hohen Neuendorf West – Oranienburg	Hourly
RB 21	Potsdam – Golm – Marquardt - Priort - Wustermark - Berlin Gesundbrunnen	Every half hour
RB 22	Potsdam – Golm – Berlin BER Airport	Hourly
RB 23	Golm – Berlin Hbf - Berlin Ostkreuz - Berlin BER Airport	Hourly
RB 32	Oranienburg - Lichtenberg - Berlin Ostkreuz - Schönefeld (bei Berlin)	Hourly

== See also ==
- Potsdam-Schönefeld Expressway
