= Potsdam Park Sanssouci station =

Railway station in Potsdam, Germany

Potsdam Park Sanssouci
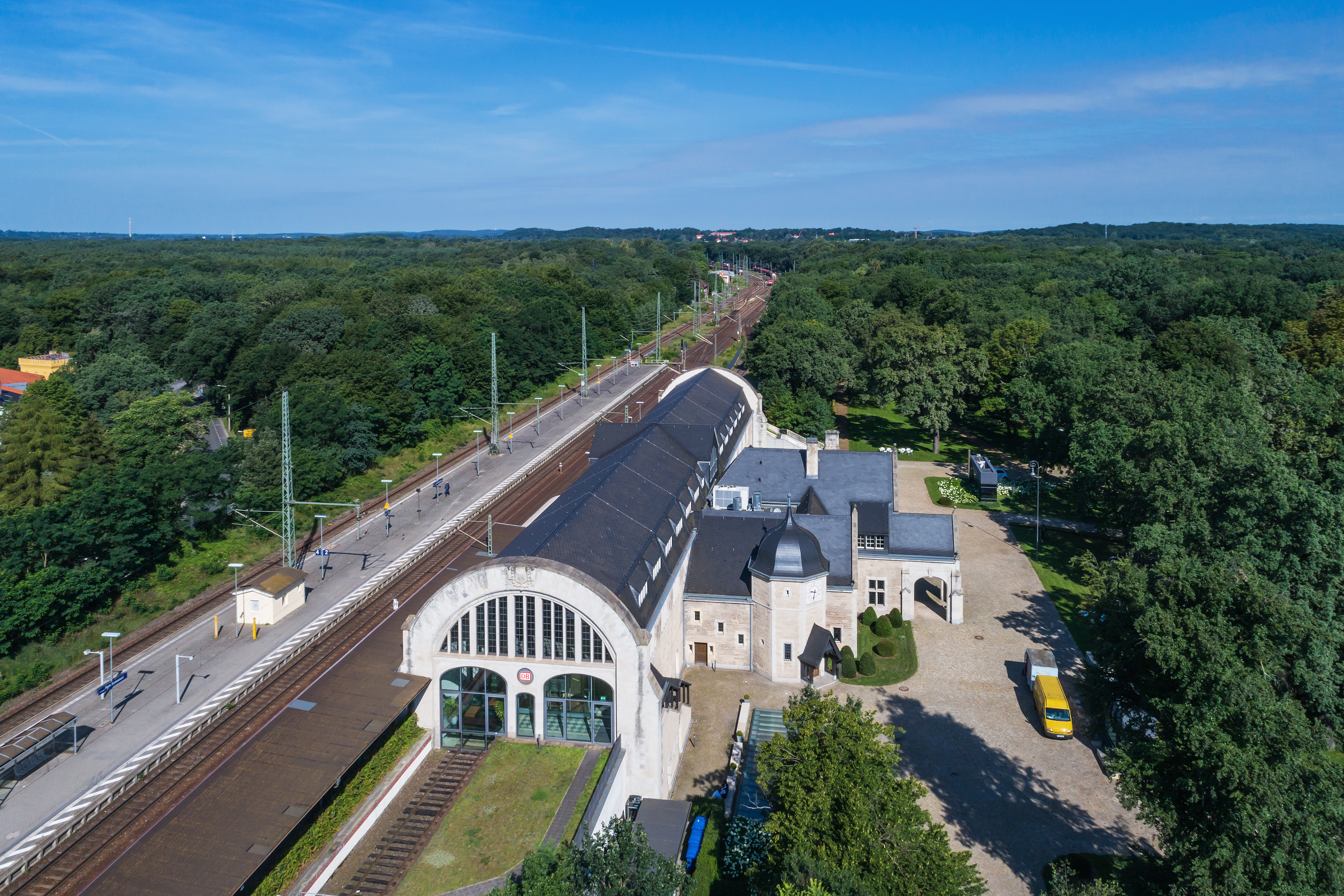
- The Kaiserbahnhof hall and the platforms

General information
- Location: Am Neues Palais, 14401 Potsdam, Brandenburg; Germany
- Coordinates: 52°23′40″N 13°0′50″E
- Owner: DB Netz
- Operator: DB Station&Service
- Lines: Berlin–Magdeburg (km 30.1) (KBS 201 / 260); Jüterbog–Nauen (km 58.8) (KBS 209.20 / 209.21)

Construction
- Accessible: Yes

Other information
- Station code: 5015
- DS100 code: BWP
- IBNR: 8010377
- Category: 4
- Fare zone: VBB: Berlin C and Potsdam B/5851
- Website: www.bahnhof.de

Services
Preceding station	Ostdeutsche Eisenbahn	Following station
Werder (Havel) towards Brandenburg Hbf	RE 1	Potsdam Charlottenhof towards Frankfurt (Oder)
Preceding station	DB Regio Nordost	Following station
Golm towards Oranienburg	RB 20	Potsdam Charlottenhof towards Potsdam Griebnitzsee
Golm towards Berlin Gesundbrunnen	RB 21	Potsdam Charlottenhof towards Potsdam Hbf
Golm towards Königs Wusterhausen	RB 22	Potsdam Charlottenhof towards Potsdam Griebnitzsee
Golm Terminus	RB 23	Potsdam Charlottenhof towards Potsdam Griebnitzsee or Berlin Ostbahnhof
Location

Potsdam Park Sanssouci is a German railway station located in Potsdam, the capital city of Brandenburg, on the Berlin–Magdeburg railway. Named Potsdam Wildpark until 1999, it serves the Sanssouci Park and is famous for the Kaiserbahnhof building.

== History ==
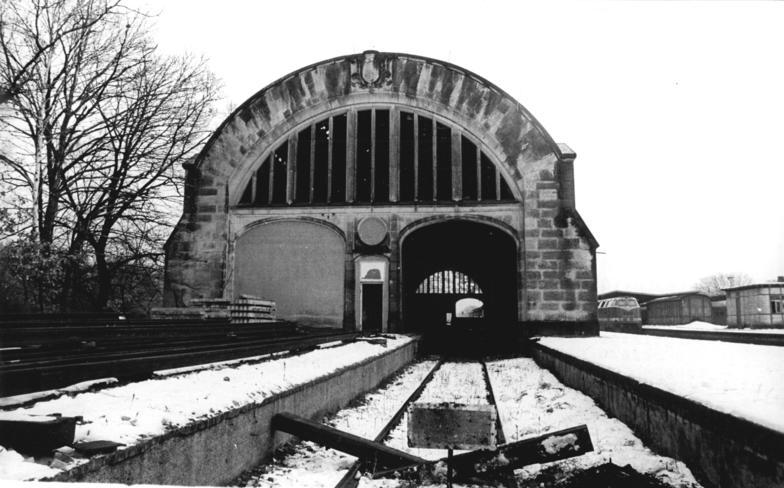
The Kaiserbahnhof and the rail hub in 1990

The Wildpark station was built in 1868 on the new line linking Berlin to Magdeburg. At the beginning of the 20th century, after the opening of the bypass lines to Nauen (1902) and Jüterbog (1904), it was built a small rail hub. In 1909 the Kaiserbahnof (see the section below) was inaugurated for the private use of Kaiser Wilhelm II. From 1950, after the division of Germany, the station functioned in the Berlin outer ring (Berliner Außenring), and for some years was served by a holiday express train from Saxony to the Baltic Sea. After the completion of the Golm-Potsdam Pirschheide bypass of the Außerring, the station remained part of a short line to Potsdam Hauptbahnhof (in that period Potsdam Stadt), although still linked to Magdeburg and the ring. This line continued to Potsdam Babelsberg, but service to West Berlin was interrupted due to the construction of The Wall.

In the middle of the 1990s, some years after German reunification and the opening of the line Potsdam-Wannsee, the station was rebuilt and renewed. The old platforms and the little rail hub, built in the early 20th century, were demolished. In 1999, the new name "Park Sanssouci" initially applied for tourist traffic only, but took the place of "Wildpark" about one year later.

== Structure ==
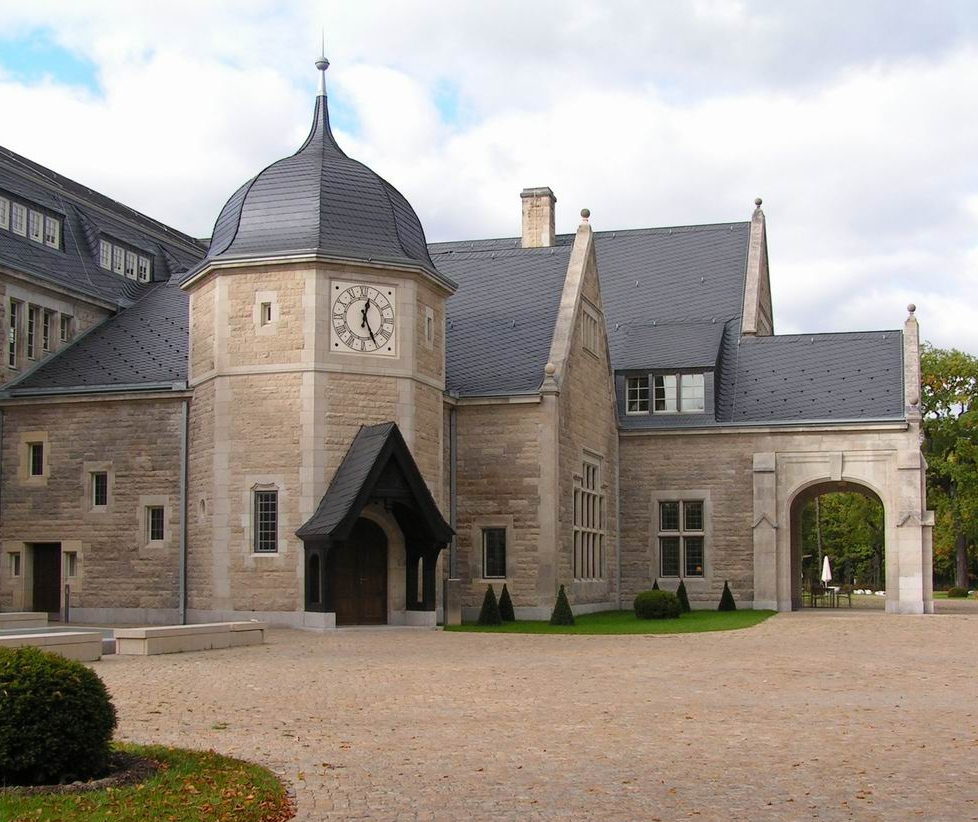
The Kaiserbahnof building

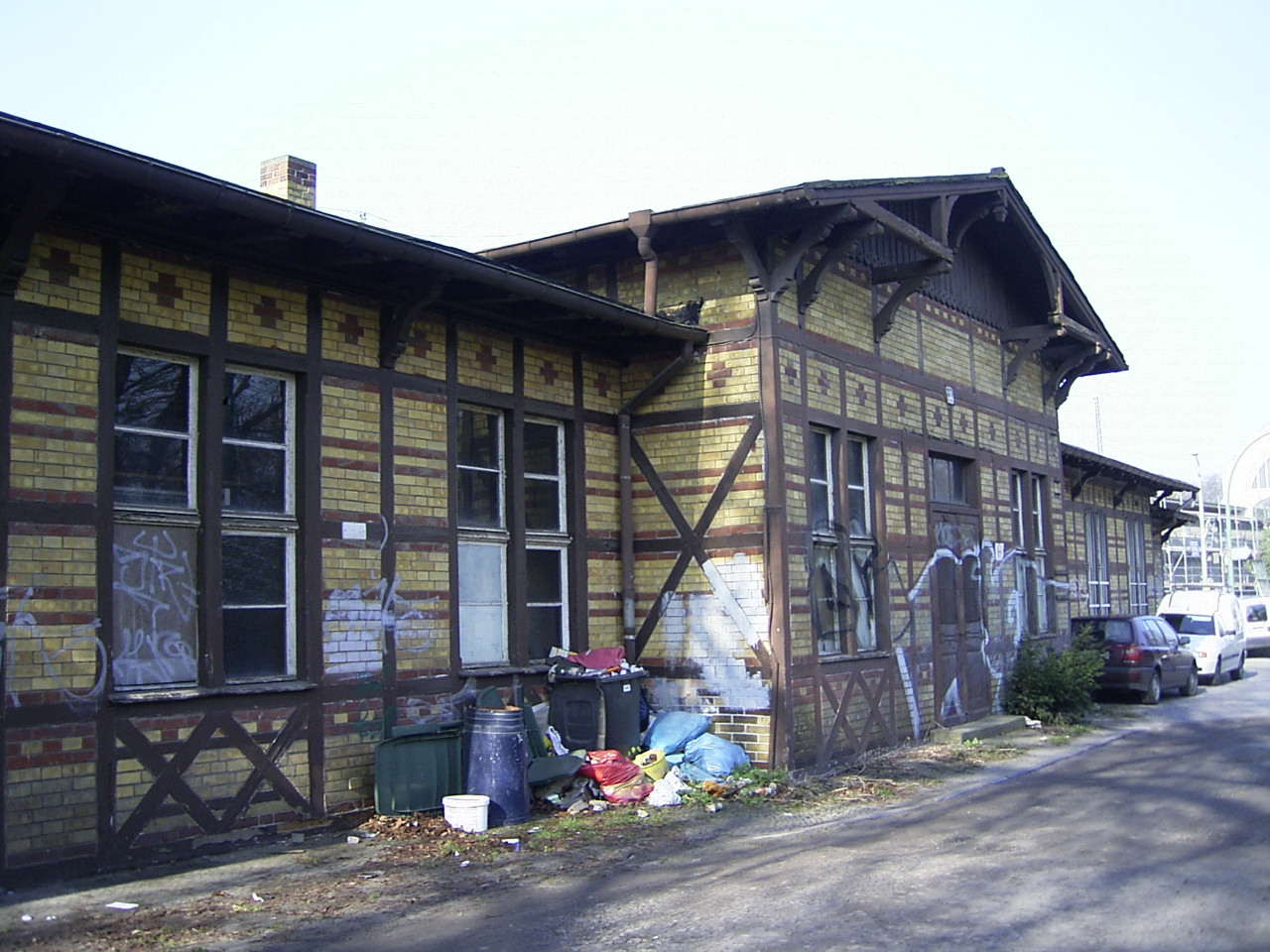
The Bürgerbahnhof building

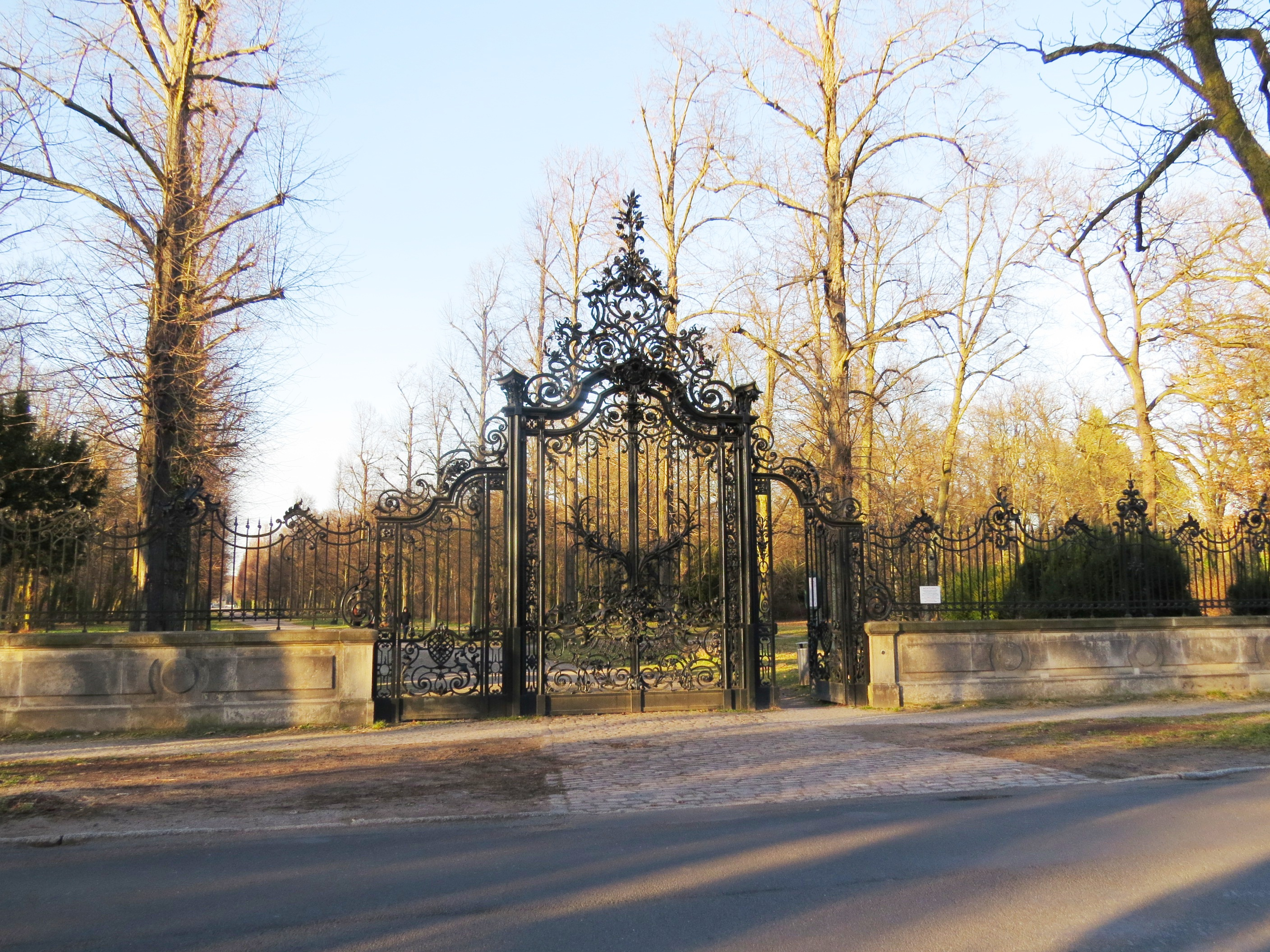
The Posttor gate, in front of the station

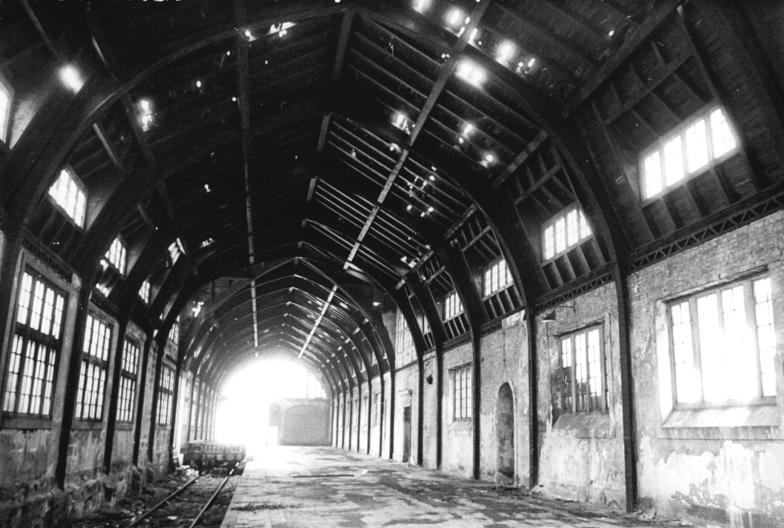
Interior view of the Kaiserbahnhof in 1990

The station is on an electrified line with two platforms serving three tracks.

=== Kaiserbahnhof ===
The Kaiserbahnhof Potsdam is a railroad station near the New Palace (Neues Palais). Its construction was initiated in 1905 by German Emperor (Kaiser) Wilhelm II, and it was used as his private station. The first official guests were Theodore Roosevelt in 1910 and Tsar Nicholas II of Russia.

From 1939 it was used by the high command of the Luftwaffe and, during the Second World War, for the special train of Hermann Göring, who was Luftwaffe chief. After 1945, it was the terminus station of the Blue Express, a train used by the Soviet military command on the route Moscow–Berlin.

Beginning in 1952, it was owned by the East German state railway company (Deutsche Reichsbahn) and subsequently used as a political school and cultural venue and for Transport Police (Transportpolizei) until its closure in 1977 due to deterioration.

In 1999, the building was added to the list of UNESCO World Heritage Site.

On 16 June 2005, the station was reopened after restoration. The building is used as an academy for senior executives of the German national railway Deutsche Bahn and is usually not publicly accessible.

=== Bürgerbahnhof ===
Apart from the Kaiserbahnhof, Park Sanssouci station has a second, minor building, the Bürgerbahnhof, used as a passenger reception hall. This wooden structure is a rare representative of station architecture from the 1860s. In front of it there is an entrance gate to Posttor park.

== Train services ==
Located on the Berlin-Potsdam-Magdeburg line and in a junction linking Potsdam to the Berlin outer ring, the station is served by regional trains linking it to Berlin and to several towns in Brandenburg, such as Brandenburg an der Havel, Frankfurt (Oder) and Fürstenwalde.

In the 2026 timetable the following lines stop at the station:

Line	Route
RE 1	Magdeburg Hbf – Brandenburg Hbf – Werder (Havel) – Pdm.-Park Sanssouci – Pdm.-Charlottenhof – Potsdam Hbf – Wannsee – Charlottenburg – Zoologischer Garten – Berlin Hbf – Ostbahnhof – Ostkreuz – Erkner – Fangschleuse – Hangelsberg – Frankfurt (Oder)
RB 20	Oranienburg – Birkenwerder – Hohen Neuendorf West – Hennigsdorf – Golm – Pdm.-Park Sanssouci – Pdm.-Charlottenhof – Potsdam Hbf – Potsdam Griebnitzsee
RB 21	Potsdam Hbf – Pdm.-Charlottenhof – Pdm.-Park Sanssouci – Golm – Marquardt – Priort – Wustermark – Elstal – Dallgow-Döberitz – Staaken – Berlin-Spandau – Berlin Jungfernheide – Berlin Gesundbrunnen
RB 22	Potsdam Griebnitzsee – Potsdam Hbf – Pdm.-Charlottenhof – Pdm.-Park Sanssouci – Golm – Potsdam Pirschheide – Saarmund – Ludwigsfelde-Struveshof – Airport – Königs Wusterhausen
RB 23	Golm – Pdm.-Park Sanssouci – Pdm.-Charlottenhof – Potsdam Hbf – Potsdam Griebnitzsee (– Wannsee – Charlottenburg – Zoologischer Garten – Berlin Hbf – Friedrichstraße – Ostbahnhof)

Potsdam Park Sanssouci is included in fare zone "B" (Tarifbereich B) of the Potsdam public transport network and in fare zone "C" (Tarifbereich C) of the Berlin public transport network. Not part of the S-Bahn network, it is involved in a feasibility project regarding the extension of the S7 line from Potsdam Hauptbahnhof to Golm and/or Werder stations.

While the station is not served by the Potsdam Tramway, the nearest stop is Schloß Charlottenhof, less than 1 km away.
