= Potsdam Pirschheide station =

Railway station in Potsdam, Germany

Potsdam Pirschheide
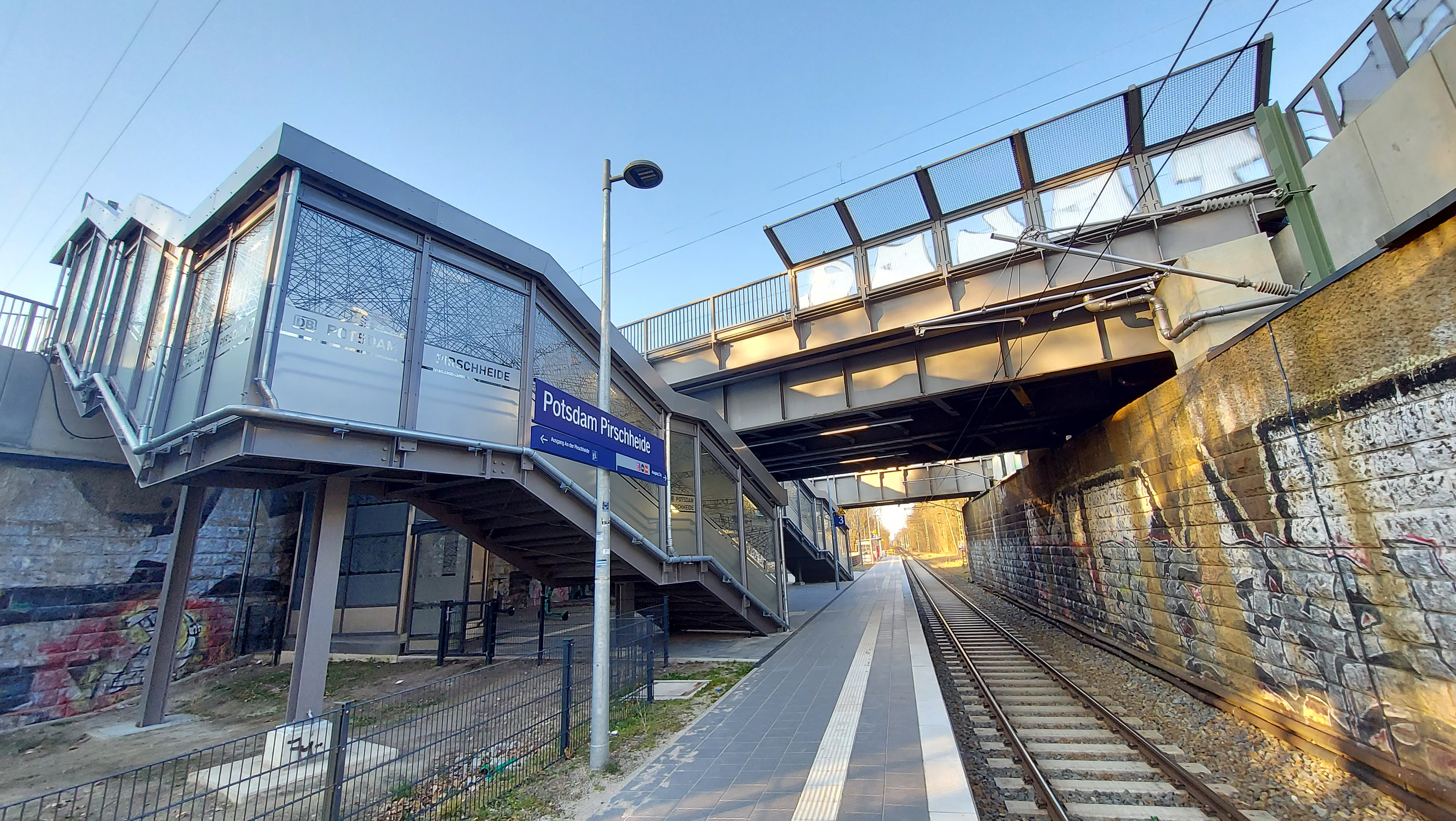
- The low level in 2025

General information
- Location: Drewitz, Potsdam, Brandenburg; Germany
- Coordinates: 52°22′22″N 13°0′40″E
- Lines: Berlin outer ring; Jüterbog–Nauen railway (KBS 209.22)
- Platforms: 3 (formerly 6)

Construction
- Accessible: Yes
- Architect: Wolfgang Dreßler, Walter Mempel

Other information
- Station code: 5011
- DS100 code: BPDP
- IBNR: 8010279
- Category: 6
- Fare zone: VBB: Berlin C and Potsdam B/5851
- Website: www.bahnhof.de

History
- Opened: 18 January 1958
- Closed: 28 May 1999 (upper station)
- Former names: Potsdam Süd (1958–1961); Potsdam Hauptbahnhof (1961–1993)

Passengers
- 500/day

Services
Preceding station	DB Regio Nordost	Following station
Saarmund towards Königs Wusterhausen	RB 22	Golm towards Potsdam Griebnitzsee
Preceding station	Ostdeutsche Eisenbahn	Following station
Potsdam Charlottenhof towards Potsdam Hbf	RB 33	Caputh-Geltow towards Jüterbog
Location

Potsdam Pirschheide station is a station on the Berlin outer ring. It was opened in 1958 as Potsdam Süd (south) station and was called Potsdam Hauptbahnhof (main station) from 1961 to 1993. In this period it was the most important station on the outer ring after Berlin Schönefeld Flughafen station.

Although the station is far from the centre of Potsdam on the Pirschheide (Pirsch heath) to the southwest of the town, in its heyday as the main station it had substantial passenger traffic and often reached its capacity limit. With reunification, however, the station rapidly lost importance and was almost completely closed except for a single platform in the lower part of the station.

A renovation of the station was completed in April 2024. For the first time in 25 years, regional trains began stopping at the upper level of the Pirschheide station. It is classified by Deutsche Bahn as a category 6 station.

== History ==
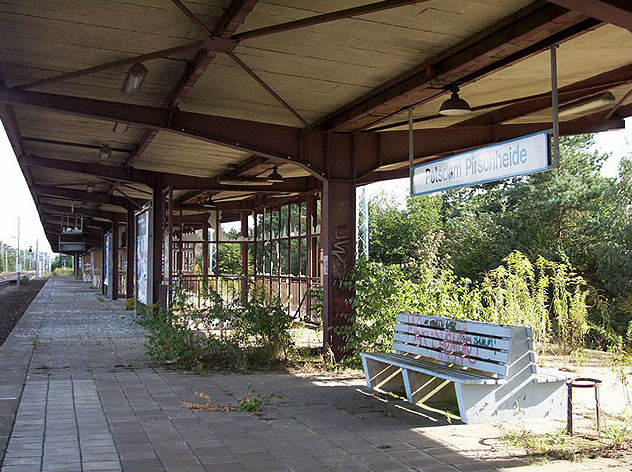
One of the upper platforms, when closed

As a result of the four-power status of the former capital of Germany and the deepening division of Berlin and Germany, the operation of railway traffic in and around West Berlin became complicated for Deutsche Reichsbahn (DR), which now operated railways in East Germany (GDR). To solve this problem, it was planned to build a bypass that would connect the northwest, west and southwest of the Berlin region to the reorganised capital of the GDR, East Berlin, bypassing West Berlin. By 1954, large parts of the new outer ring were completed and on 30 September 1956, the last section of the ring between Golm and Saarmund, including the crossing of the Templiner See (lake), on the outskirts of Potsdam was taken into operation.

=== Construction and commissioning ===
The station at the junction of the Berlin outer ring with the Jüterbog–Nauen railway (which connected Potsdam Stadt—now Potsdam Hauptbahnhof—via Seddin freight yard and Seddin to Michendorf) was built in 1956/57 and officially inaugurated on 18 January 1958 as Potsdam Süd (south). It is in a wooded area called Pirschheide ("Deerstalking heath"), about 0.8 km from the southern end of the Potsdam built-up area and about 3 km from the city centre.

The station was designed in the design office of Deutsche Reichsbahn. The architects were Wolfgang Dressler and Walter Mempel. The building was designed as a two-level interchange station (known in German as a Turmbahnhof, literally a "tower station") at the junction of the two railway lines and set out as a lower level with an island platform with two platform faces and an upper level with two island platforms, four platform faces and two through tracks for the (very heavy) freight traffic. All platforms were interconnected with stairs and tunnels. A large station building was built in the typical architectural style of the late 1950s. A tunnel ran from the station hall to the lower platform and another tunnel ran to the stairs leading to the upper platforms. The building housed, along with the ticket office, typical station facilities for retail and hospitality as well as facilities for railway employees.

=== Importance in the GDR ===
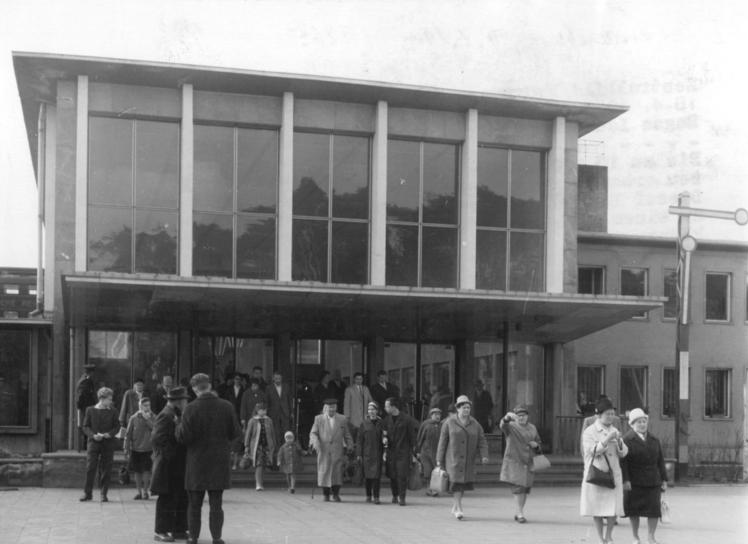
The station then called Potsdam Hauptbahnhof (1963)

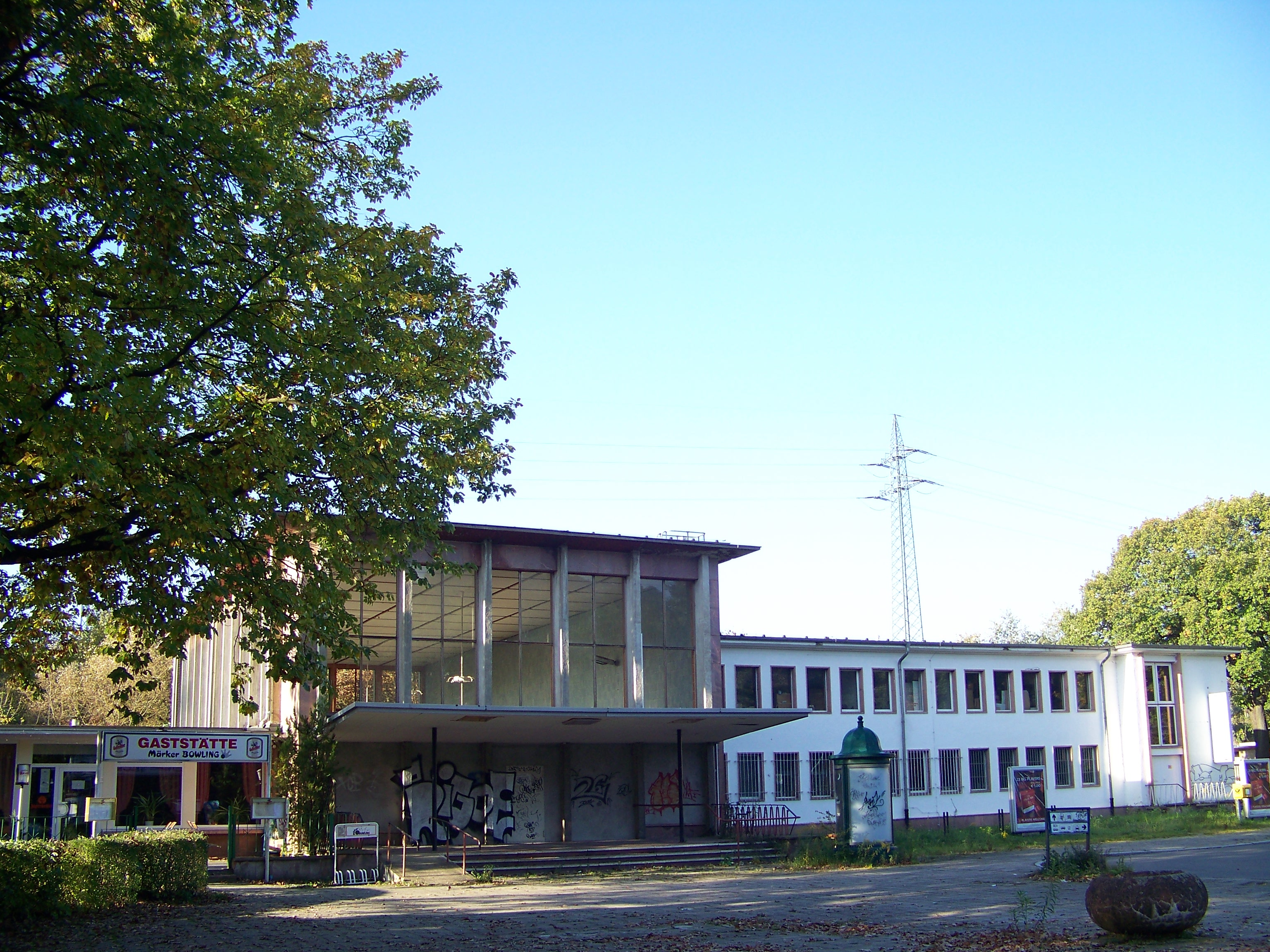
The station forecourt in 2010

The station was renamed Potsdam Hauptbahnhof on 2 October 1960. All long-distance trains and Interzonal trains (on the Aachen/Cologne–Görlitz and Rostock–Munich routes) passing through Potsdam stopped here. The local express trains between East Berlin and Potsdam, operated with double-deck carriages (initially painted dark green, later red-beige) were known unofficially as Sputnik trains. The upper level tracks were often congested, so that trains often had to wait outside the station. The old Potsdam station, which was closer to the city centre, was named Potsdam Stadt (city) and, from the establishment of the Berlin Wall until 1990, it was served by local diesel trains only. Commuter trains ran from the lower platforms of the Hauptbahnhof to Babelsberg via Potsdam Stadt and towards Wildpark or Beelitz and Jüterbog.

A new route of the Potsdam tramway was opened on 11 January 1958 to a terminus at the station. In addition, a bus station, a taxi rank, a petrol station and parking for bicycles were provided.

=== Effects of unification from 1990 ===
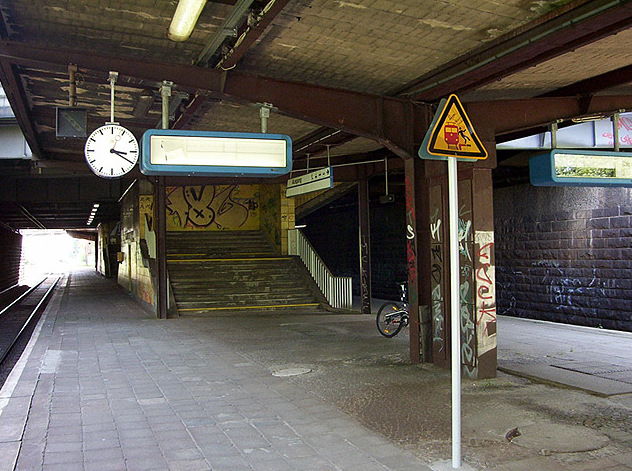
The low level in 2005

With German reunification, the station lost its importance as long-distance passenger trains again ran over the Berlin Stadtbahn instead of the Berlin outer ring. Since 1991, no long-distance trains have stopped at the station, which was renamed Potsdam Pirschheide in 1993. The Potsdam Stadt station once again became Potsdam’s main station and was renamed Potsdam Hauptbahnhof in 1999. Pirschheide Station initially remained important for regional traffic. In addition to the Sputnik trains to Werder (Havel) or Berlin Schönefeld Flughafen and Berlin-Karlshorst, trains still ran hourly on the western section of the outer ring to Falkenhagen until 1994 or temporarily on a through route between Oranienburg and Ludwigsfelde. In the mid-90s, there was a brief attempt to establish a Regional-Express service from Potsdam to Finsterwalde and Cottbus. Despite a direct tram connection in Pirschheide, this service had no success and it was abandoned in 1997. From the lower level of the station, services ran every two hours towards Beelitz and Jüterbog in one direction and Potsdam Stadt in the other. The ticket counter at the station was closed in 1994 because of lack of demand.

In 1998, the direct service to Schönefeld was rerouted and has since run through the lower level of the station. The platform on the upper level continued to be served until 1999 by a single daily pair of trains from Strausberg to Golm. In 1999, this part of the station was closed. Only the two through freight tracks remained open.

=== Development after the closure of the upper platforms ===
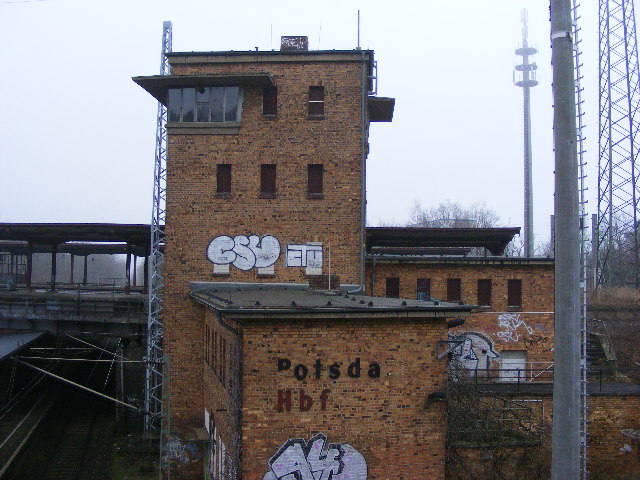
The former signalbox and part of the upper platform in 2009

After years of closure, the facilities resembled a ghost station that had been left to decay. Weeds on the platforms, the shattered panes of the sealed-off stairwells and boarded-up waiting rooms characterised this image. All the walls were covered with graffiti and only the platform roof was still intact. The tracks on the platforms of the upper station and all crossovers have been dismantled. Only the two main-line through tracks remain. The old information displays made in Czechoslovakia on the upper platforms are still present, although they are no longer functional. Since the electrification of the lower track in 1999, there is only one platform (platform 1, formerly platform 7) in operation. The exit signals of the crossing track are switched off, but are operational, the position of the points has been locked, but they still exist.

The lower platform is used by regional traffic. From 1998 to 2011, the Regionalbahn RB 22 service ran from Potsdam via Caputh to Schönefeld; since December 2011, service RB 23 has run from Potsdam to Michendorf via Pirschheide. Since then, the RB 22 line has been running again over the Berlin outer ring, but without stopping at the platforms of the former upper part of Pirschheide station. With the timetable change in December 2022, line RB 23 was discontinued so that only RB 33 line (Potsdam Hbf – Jüterbog) stopped in Pirschheide.

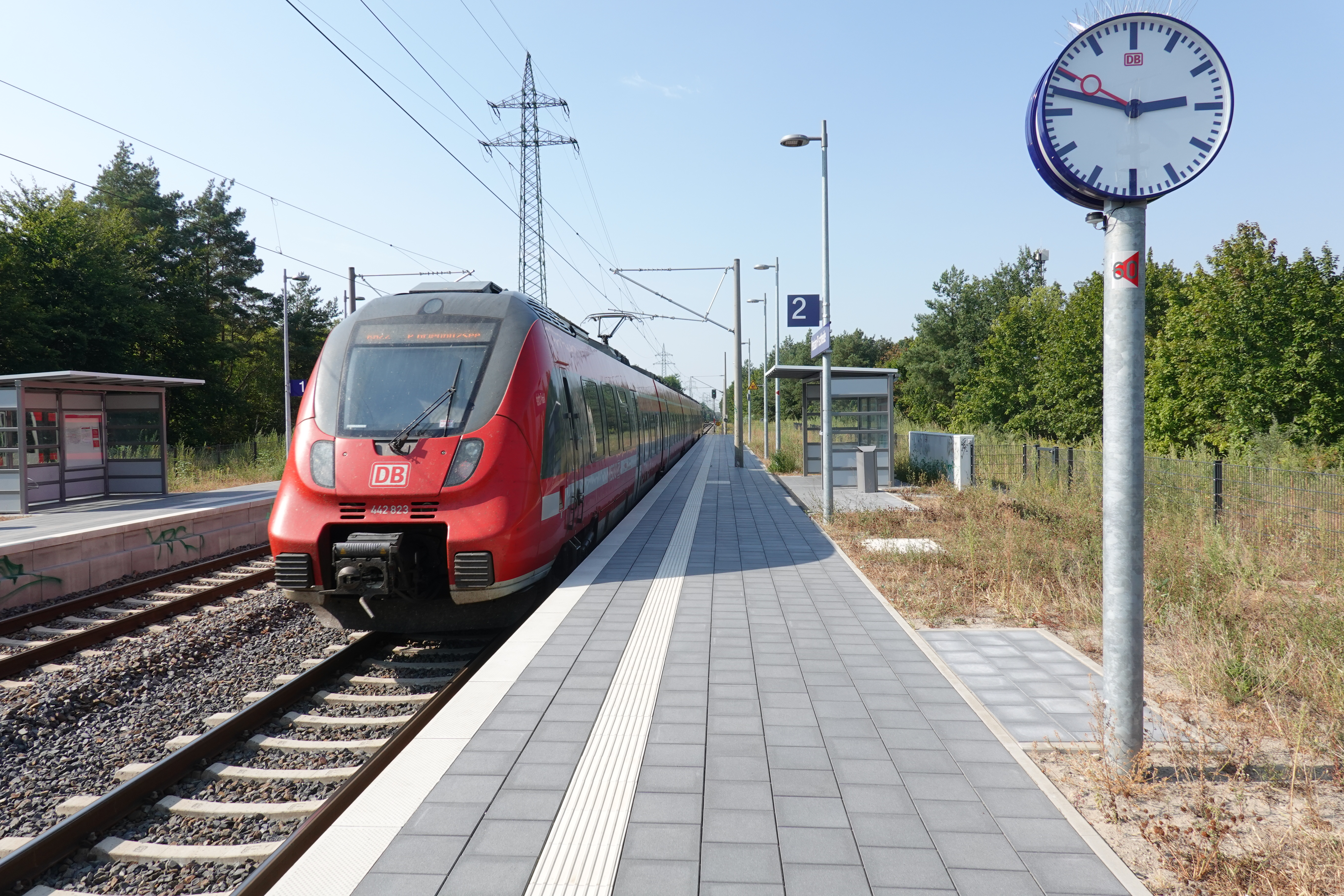
Newly built upper platform at the Berlin outer ring, 2024

A recommissioning of the upper platforms has been investigated since 2008 in order to link the lines RB 22 and RB 33 and thus enable a transfer option from Caputh and Michendorf towards Schönefeld (BER airport). Another reason for the planned reactivation of the stop was the interchange with the RB 22 to buses and trams to Potsdam and Werder.

Plans for platforms in the upper part of the station were revived again in 2016. The old platforms would no longer be put into operation, but new platforms would be built on the existing through tracks. In 2017, demolition work took place on the roofs of the upper platform. According to the plans at the time, both parts of the station were to be completely renovated by 2021 and 2022 respectively. At the end of 2022, it was said that work on the new construction of the upper platforms and the access to the lower platform should begin in the first quarter of 2023; some preparatory work had already taken place in autumn 2022. The new upper platforms were scheduled to be put into operation for the timetable change on 10 December 2023 at the beginning of December 2023, but the commissioning was briefly delayed until 2024. After there was initially talk of an opening on 9 March 2024. The official commissioning finally took place on 27 April 2024.

== Station area ==
In the immediate vicinity of the station are the Sparkassen (state savings bank) academy, several hotels and recreational areas of interest for hikers: the Templiner See and the Pirschheide. At the end of the 2010s, the development of a new urban district with several hundred new apartments was also planned in the area surrounding the station.

== Station building ==
The station building that was built in 1958 was closed in 2006/07. Since then, the lower platform can be reached from the station forecourt directly via the former platform 8 and from the bridge at the southern end of the platform. The tunnel from the upper station to the entrance building was demolished in 2012 and the stairs from the upper to the lower station have been closed. A bowling restaurant located in the building remained open. Other parts of the building were increasingly falling into disrepair. Proposals to demolish it have been precluded by its notable functionalist architecture in the style of the late 1950s, which would justify conversion for new uses.

In 2012, an entrepreneur from Werder (Havel) acquired the station building. Originally he planned to use the area for his company. Once a different solution was developed for the company’s premises, he considered using the building as a cultural centre. The Märker Bowling restaurant would remain in the building. In 2013, Potsdam Pirschheide station, including its paved forecourt, was heritage-listed by the state of Brandenburg. In spring 2017, the "Pirschheide" event location opened in the building's former entrance hall.

== Rail services ==
The station is served by Regionalbahn line RB 33 (lower part of the station) and, since 27 April 2024, also by the RB 22 line on the upper level of the station, which has previously passed through without stopping.

Tram lines 91 and 94 as well as bus line 697 of the Verkehrsbetrieb Potsdam (the Potsdam municipal transport company), as well as intercity bus lines 580 and 631 of Regiobus Potsdam-Mittelmark, stop at the station forecourt.

Line	Route	Frequency (min)	Operator
RB 22	(Potsdam Griebnitzsee –) Potsdam Hbf – Potsdam Charlottenhof – Potsdam Park Sanssouci – Golm – Potsdam Pirschheide – Saarmund – Ludwigsfelde-Struveshof – BER Airport – Königs Wusterhausen	60	DB Regio
RB 33	Potsdam Hbf – Potsdam Pirschheide – Ferch-Lienewitz – Beelitz Stadt – Treuenbrietzen – Jüterbog	60	Ostdeutsche Eisenbahn
As of 29 April 2024

== See also ==
- List of railway stations in Brandenburg
