= Potsdam Hauptbahnhof =

Railway station in Potsdam, Germany

Potsdam Hbf
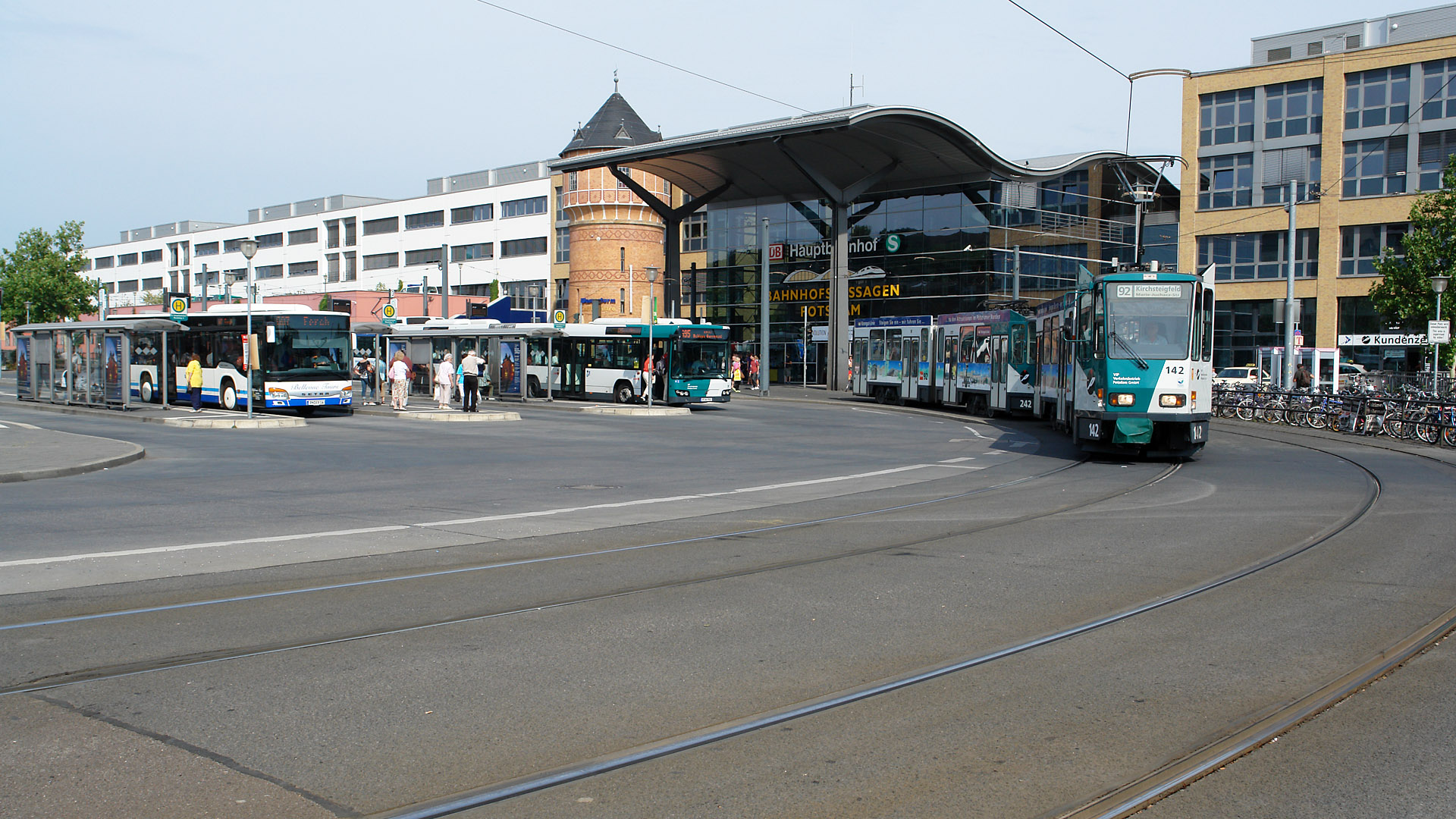
- Station forecourt south of the tracks with bus and tram stop and water tower

General information
- Location: Friedrich Engels Straße, 14401, Potsdam, Brandenburg; Germany
- Coordinates: 52°23′30″N 13°04′00″E
- Owner: Deutsche Bahn
- Operator: DB Netz; DB Station&Service
- Lines: Berlin–Magdeburg railway (km 26.1) (KBS 201 / 260); Wannsee Railway (km 33.1) (KBS 200.1)
- Platforms: 3
- Tracks: 6
- Train operators: DB Regio Nordost
- Connections: Tram interchange Bus interchange

Construction
- Accessible: Yes
- Architect: Gerkan, Marg and Partners

Other information
- Station code: 5012
- DS100 code: BPD
- IBNR: 8012666
- Category: 2
- Fare zone: : Berlin C and Potsdam A/5750
- Website: www.bahnhof.de

History
- Opened: 22 November 1838
Services
Preceding station	DB Fernverkehr	Following station
Brandenburg Hbf towards Köln Hbf	ICE 10	Berlin-Wannsee towards Berlin Ostbahnhof
Brandenburg Hbf towards Leipzig Hbf	IC 17	Berlin-Wannsee towards Ostseebad Binz
Brandenburg Hbf towards Magdeburg Hbf or Norddeich Mole	IC 56	Berlin-Wannsee towards Cottbus Hbf or Rostock Hbf
Preceding station	DB Regio Nordost	Following station
Potsdam Charlottenhof towards Oranienburg	RB 20	Terminus
Potsdam Charlottenhof towards Berlin Gesundbrunnen	RB 21	Terminus
Potsdam Charlottenhof towards Königs Wusterhausen	RB 22	Terminus
Potsdam Charlottenhof towards Golm	RB 23	Potsdam Griebnitzsee towards Potsdam Griebnitzsee or Berlin Ostbahnhof
Preceding station	Ostdeutsche Eisenbahn	Following station
Potsdam Charlottenhof towards Brandenburg Hbf	RE 1	Berlin-Wannsee towards Frankfurt (Oder)
Werder (Havel) towards Magdeburg Hbf	RE 1	Berlin-Wannsee towards Cottbus Hbf
Potsdam Charlottenhof towards Jüterbog	RB 33	Terminus
Preceding station	Berlin S-Bahn	Following station
Terminus	S7	Babelsberg towards Ahrensfelde
Location

Potsdam Hauptbahnhof is the main station in the German city of Potsdam, capital of the state of Brandenburg. It lies on the Berlin–Magdeburg railway and was founded in 1838. However, it has had this name only since 1999. It was originally called Bahnhof Potsdam (Potsdam station) and it was called Potsdam Stadt (city) station from 1960. The station is the terminus of line S7 of the Berlin S-Bahn, which comes from Ahrensfelde. It is also connected with the central bus station, which is a transfer point between Potsdam and the southwestern region of Berlin, and has a stop on the Potsdam tram network. It is classified by Deutsche Bahn as a category 2 station.

== History ==
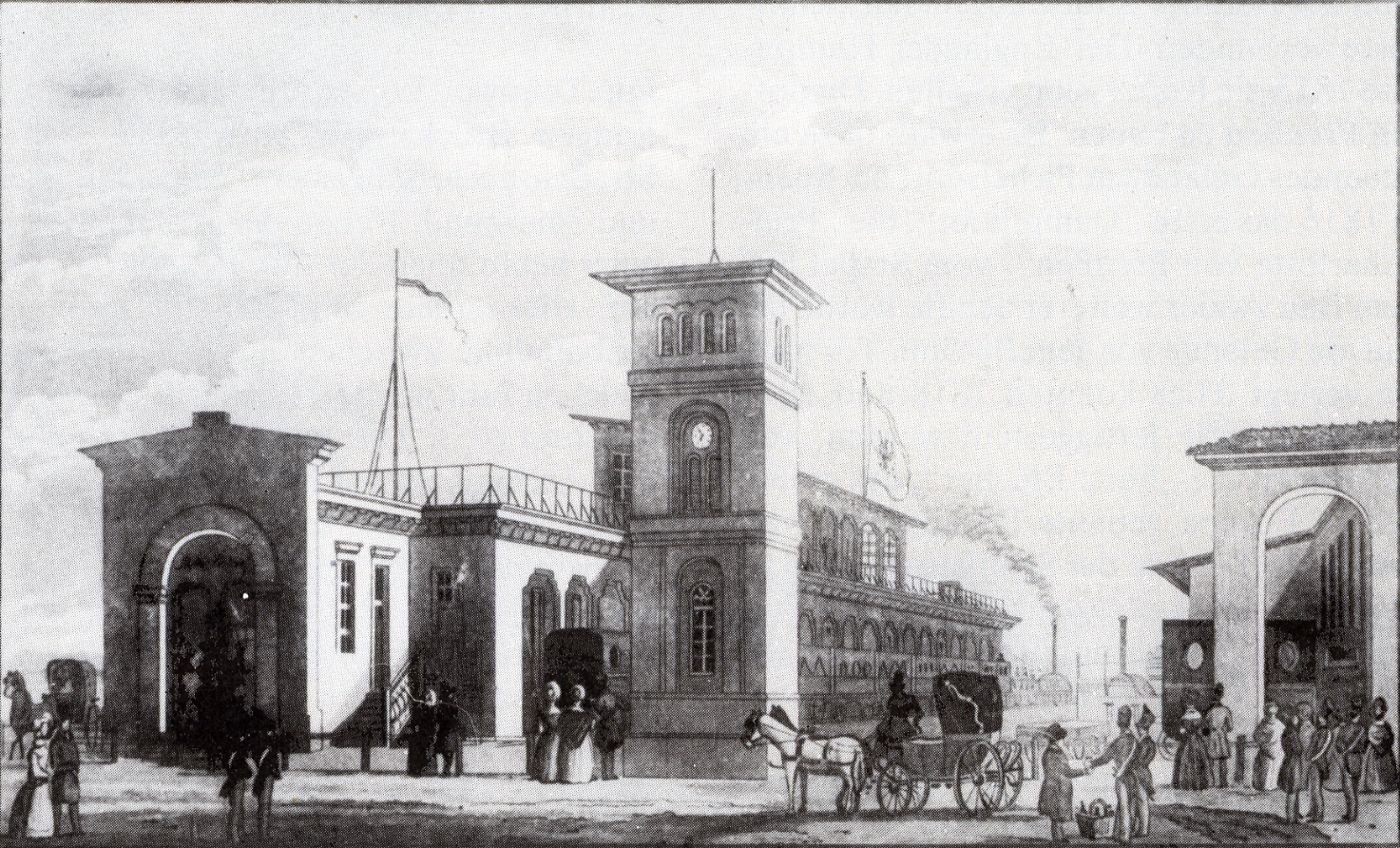
The first station on the site of current Hauptbahnhof in about 1840

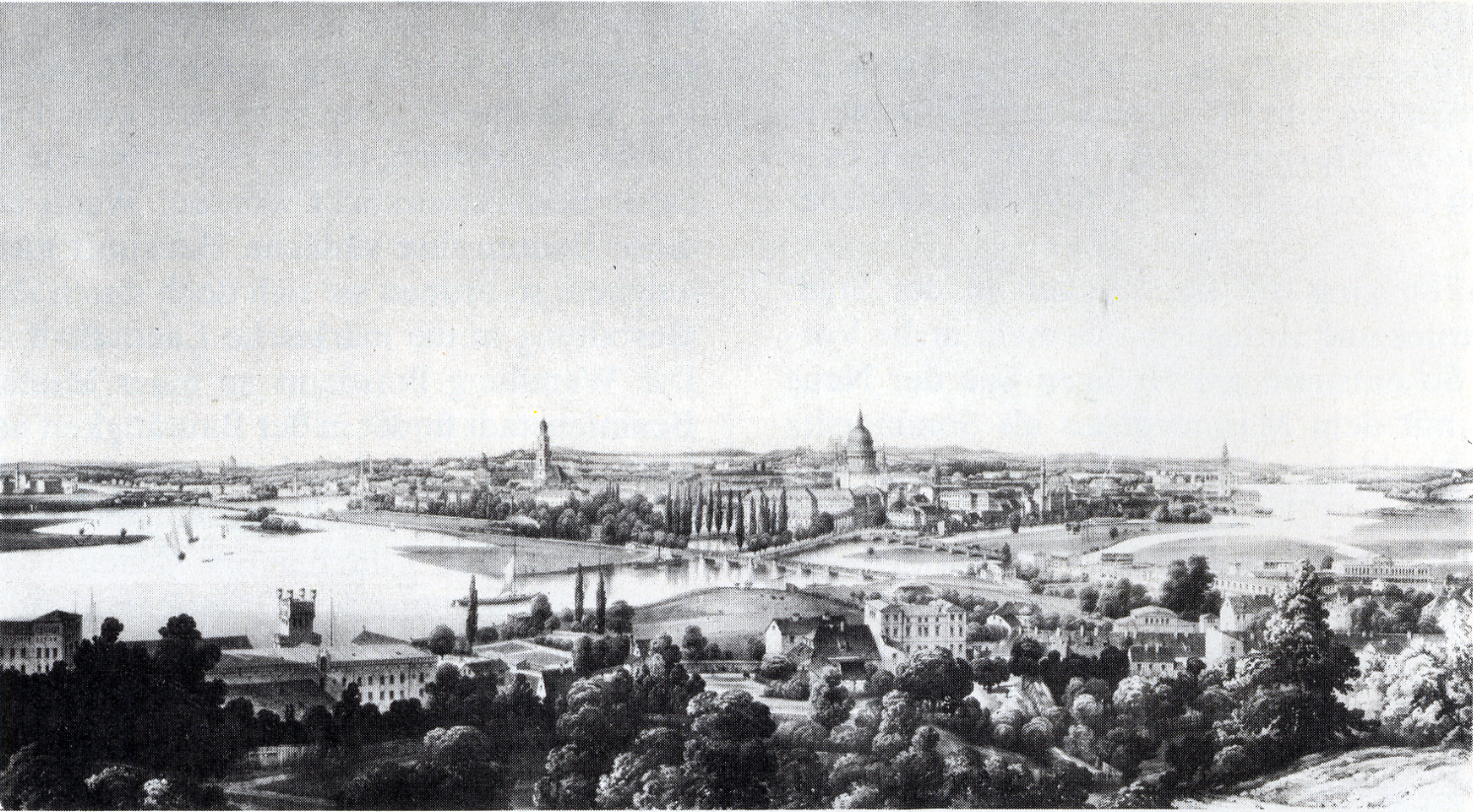
Potsdam in about 1850 with the rail bridge and the long bridge (Lange Brücke), the station was to the right just behind the trees

The first railway from Berlin to Potsdam was opened on 22 September 1838. It was the first railway in Prussia and is now one of the oldest railways in Germany still in operation. Its final stop was at the site of the current Potsdam station. From the station, a port track ran to a steam boat landing west of the Long Bridge (Lange Brücke). With the commissioning of the Potsdam Railway bridge over the Havel by the Potsdam-Magdeburg Railway Company (Potsdam-Magdeburger Eisenbahngesellschaft) on 7 August 1846, the former terminus became a through station. The station building was built in the neoclassical style. This and the station forecourt (Bahnhofsvorplatz) now lay north of the tracks. In 1928, it was connected to the Berlin S-Bahn network. The complete electrification of the suburban line lasted nearly a year. In World War II, the station was destroyed and a new station building was built after the war.

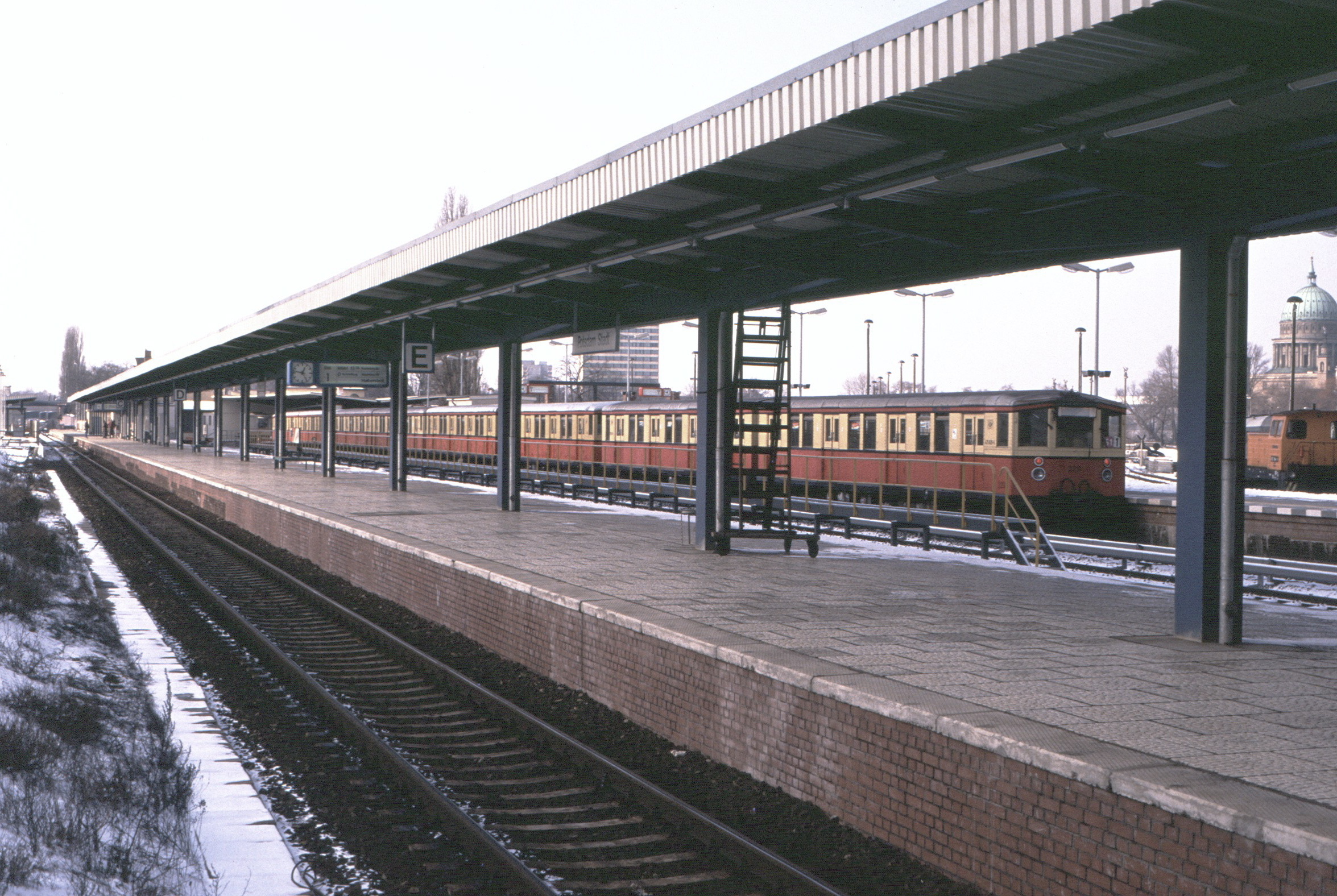
Potsdam Stadt station, 1993

From 1953 to 1958, it was connected to East Berlin by S-Bahn Durchläuferzüge ("through running trains"), which did not stop in West Berlin. From 1958, East Germany relocated internal traffic to the developing Berlin outer ring. After the commissioning of the outer ring so-called Sputnik trains ran from the new Potsdam Süd (south) station on the south-western outskirts (now called Potsdam Pirschheide station) via Schönefeld Airport to East Berlin. Long-distance trains on internal routes and later Interzone trains (Aachen–Görlitz and Munich–Rostock) also ran over the outer ring. The station was renamed Potsdam Stadt in 1960 and Potsdam Süd station was renamed Potsdam Hauptbahnhof in 1961. The electric S-Bahn service to Potsdam was disrupted by the construction of the Berlin Wall in 1961 and abandoned a few months later. The Potsdam Stadt and Babelsberg stations could only be reached by local trains from inter alia the old Potsdam Hauptbahnhof. The transit trains (Transitzügen) between West Berlin and West Germany passed through Potsdam Stadt and there were personnel to monitor boarding and disembarking passengers at Potsdam Griebnitzsee. Passengers could not board there until 1963.

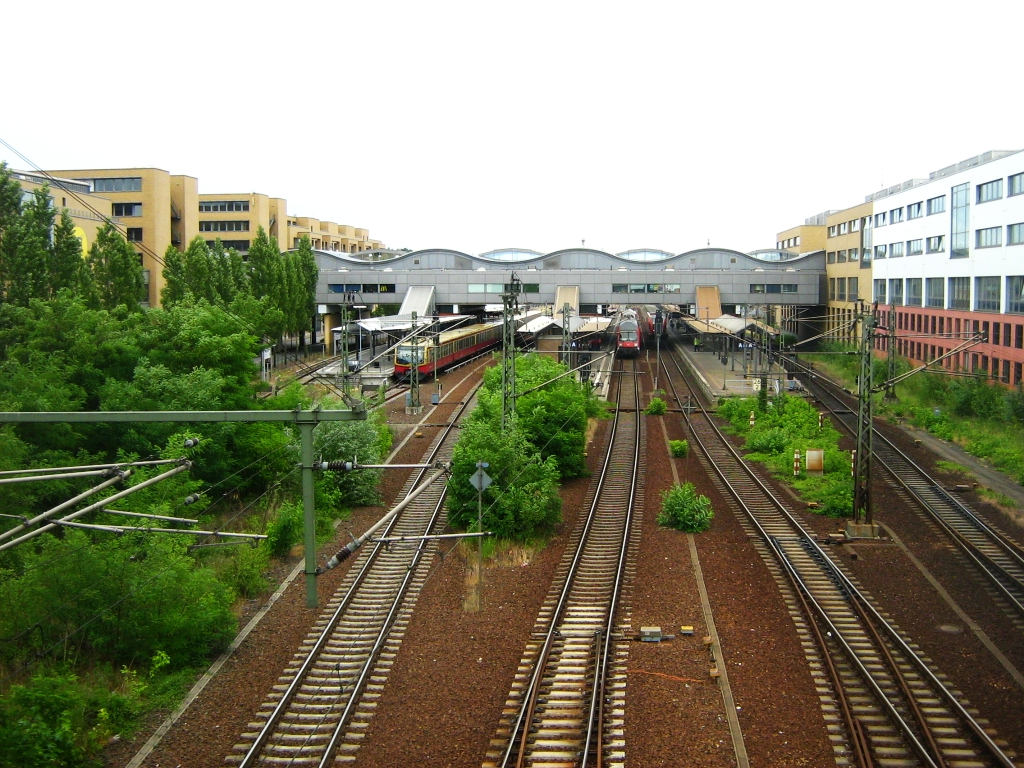
Track field of the Hauptbahnhof seen from the west

In January 1990, local services were re-established to Berlin-Wannsee and full S-Bahn services were re-established in 1992. In 1997, work began on demolishing the old Potsdam Stadt station, including its entrance building, the roundhouse and sidings, and replacing them with new buildings. The design for the new works were produced by the office of Gerkan, Marg and Partners. It consists of two long building complexes that are linked by a connecting structure topped by a wavy roof. The extensions to the platforms were integrated into the connecting structure. The S-Bahn platform was built new and a regional platform was upgraded. At the south entrance, a new station forecourt was built with bus and tram platforms and a bus parking area. A new shopping centre and a cinema was opened under the name of Bahnhofspassagen Potsdam (Potsdam station passages), along with office and commercial areas.

On 1 September 1999, Potsdam Stadt station was renamed as Potsdam Hauptbahnhof. Its DS-100 code is BPD and its station code is 5012.

The construction of the station was highly controversial and was discussed at length. A proposal for a facade with yellow brickwork was rejected and the dimensions of the building give the impression of office complexes, the scale of which—as the critics predicted—would be at odds with the historical city of Potsdam. UNESCO considered whether Potsdam should be added to the List of World Heritage in Danger because of the project. Subsequent changes during construction and the non-commencement of some parts of the construction, however, meant that this could be avoided.

Since December 2014, equipment has been in use at the platform allowing “train dispatch by the driver by cab monitor” (Zugabfertigung durch den Triebfahrzeugführer mittels Führerraum-Monitor, ZAT-FM).

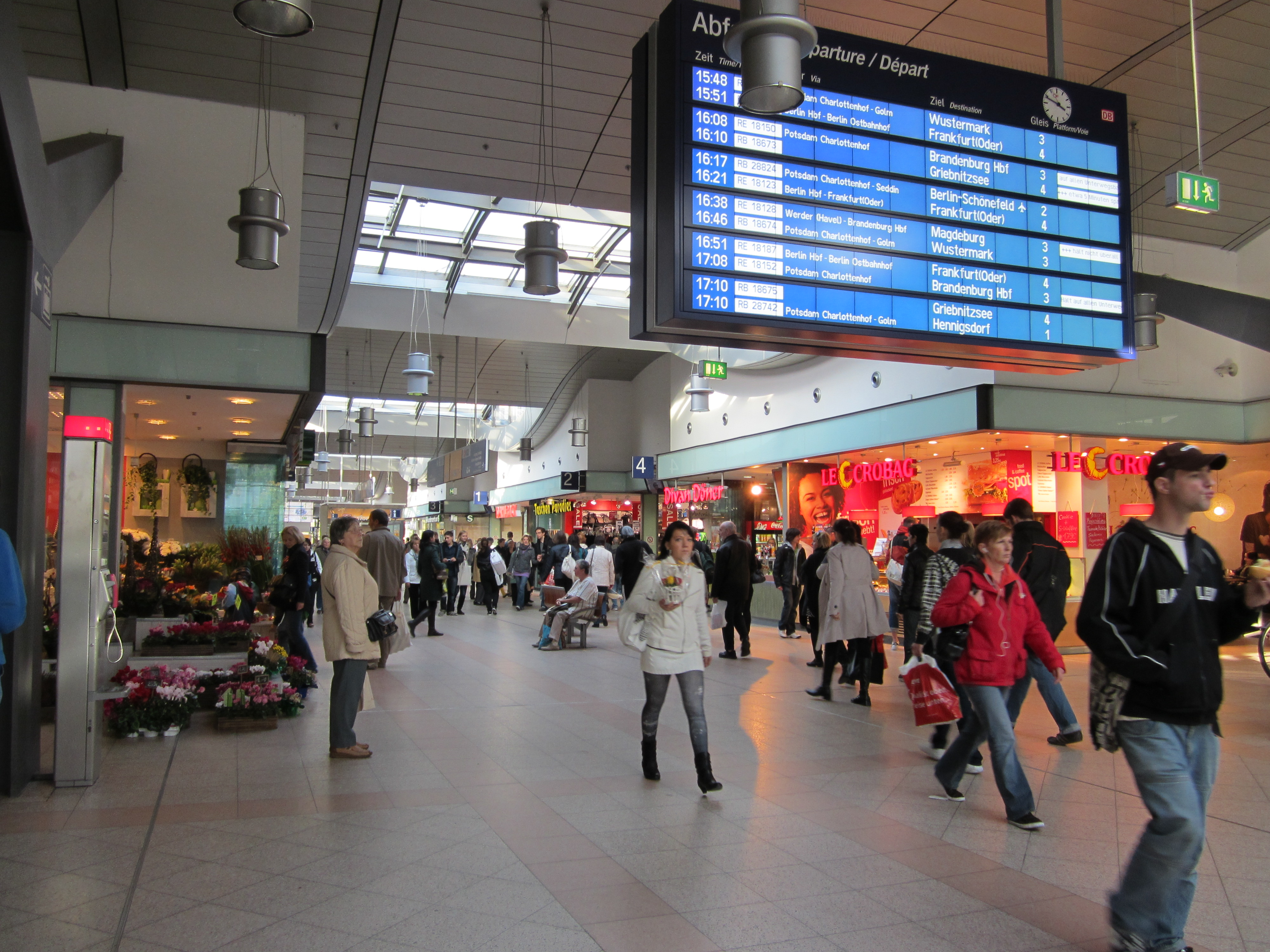
The station hall in October 2011

== Train services ==
At the May 2006 timetable change the last pair of Intercity-Express (ICE) services to stop at the station was removed. The reason was that all ICE and almost all Intercity services between Berlin and the western states operate over the Hanover–Berlin high-speed railway, and the journey from Potsdam to the western states is faster by taking a detour via Berlin than a route via Magdeburg would be.

The station is served by the following services:

Line	Route		Frequency
ICE 10	Cologne – Düsseldorf – Düsseldorf Airport – Duisburg – Essen – Dortmund – Hanover – Magdeburg – Brandenburg – Potsdam – Berlin Hbf – Berlin Ostbahnhof		One train pair
IC 56	Norddeich Mole / Emden Außenhafen – Oldenburg – Bremen – Magdeburg – Potsdam – Berlin	– Cottbus	Three train pairs
IC 56	Norddeich Mole / Emden Außenhafen – Oldenburg – Bremen – Magdeburg – Potsdam – Berlin	– Rostock – Warnemünde/Bergen auf Rügen	Three train pairs
IC 56	Dresden – Elsterwerda – Berlin Airport – Berlin – Potsdam	– Rostock – Warnemünde/Bergen auf Rügen	Three train pairs
RE 1	Magdeburg – Brandenburg – Potsdam – Wannsee – Charlottenburg – Zoologischer Garten – Berlin – Ostbahnhof – Ostkreuz – Erkner – Fangschleuse – Hangelsberg – Frankfurt		2-3 trains an hour
RB 20	Oranienburg – Birkenwerder – Hohen Neuendorf West – Hennigsdorf – Golm – Park Sanssouci – Charlottenhof – Potsdam – Potsdam Griebnitzsee		Hourly
RB 21	Potsdam – Charlottenhof – Park Sanssouci – Golm – Marquardt – Priort – Wustermark – Elstal – Dallgow-Döberitz – Berlin-Staaken – Berlin-Spandau – Berlin Jungfernheide – Berlin Gesundbrunnen		Hourly
RB 22	Potsdam Griebnitzsee – Potsdam – Charlottenhof – Park Sanssouci – Golm – Pirschheide – Saarmund – Ludwigsfelde-Struveshof – Airport – Königs Wusterhausen		Hourly
RB 23	Golm – Park Sanssouci – Charlottenhof – Potsdam – Griebnitzsee (– Wannsee – Charlottenburg – Zoologischer Garten – Berlin – Friedrichstraße – Alexanderplatz – Ostbahnhof)		Hourly
RB 33	Potsdam – Charlottenhof – Pirschheide – Caputh-Geltow – Caputh Schwielowsee – Ferch-Lienewitz – Beelitz Stadt		Hourly
S7	Potsdam – Wannsee – Westkreuz – Hauptbahnhof – Alexanderplatz – Ostbahnhof – Lichtenberg – Ahrensfelde		10 min

== See also ==
- List of railway stations in Brandenburg
- Potsdam Tramway
- Berlin S-Bahn
- Rail transport in Germany
