= Golm station =

Railway station in Potsdam, Brandenburg, Germany

Golm
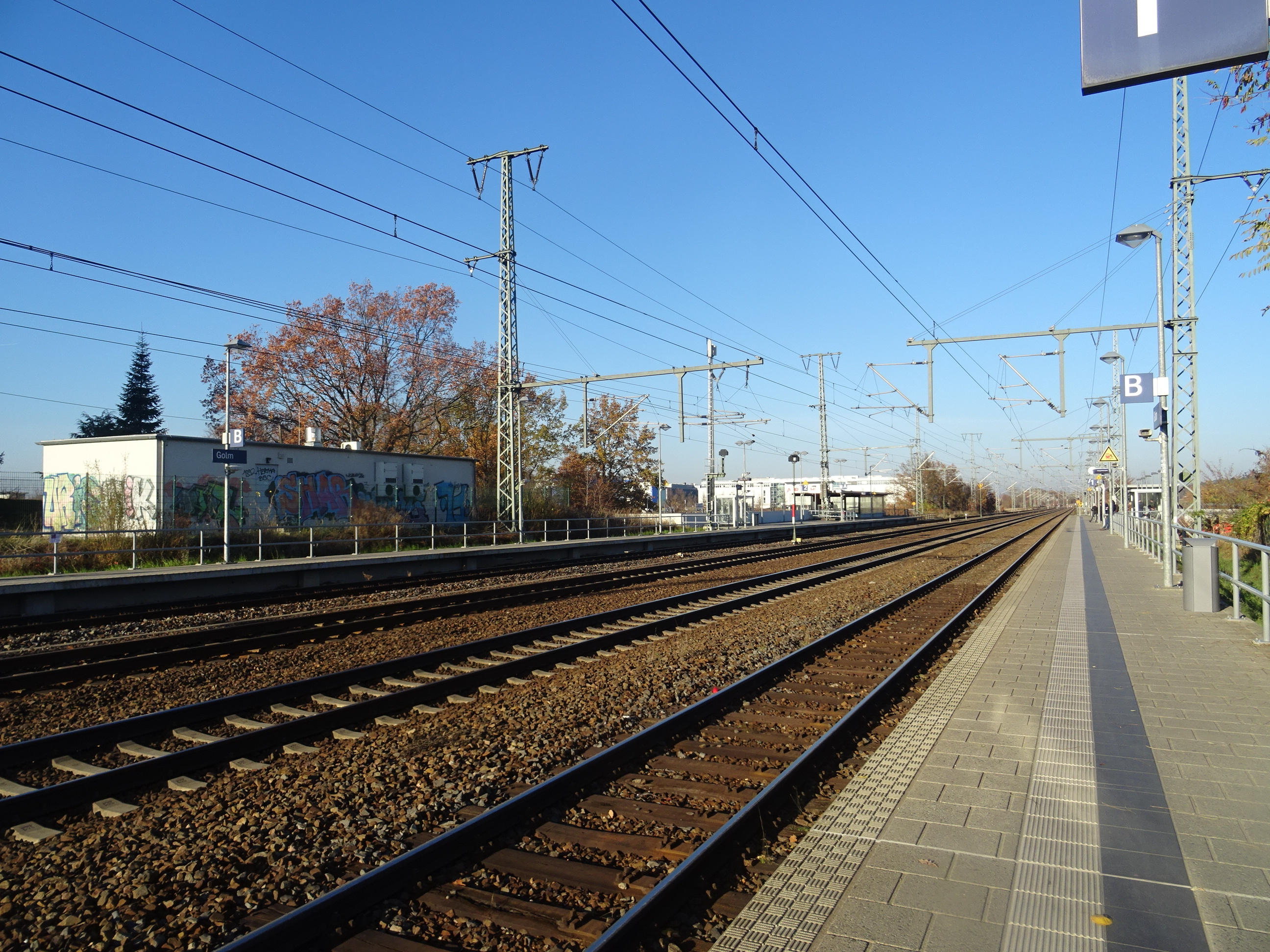
- 2018

General information
- Location: Karl-Liebknecht-Straße 28; 14476 Potsdam; Brandenburg; Germany
- Coordinates: 52.4098°N 12.9719°E
- Owner: Deutsche Bahn
- Operator: DB Station&Service
- Lines: Berlin outer ring Jüterbog–Nauen railway
- Platforms: 2 side platforms
- Tracks: 4
- Train operators: DB Regio Nordost
- Connections: 605 612 695 698 X5 N14

Construction
- Structure type: Elevated
- Accessible: Yes. Each platform is accessible via a ramp. The floors of the regional trains that serve this station are level with the platforms.

Other information
- Station code: 2178
- DS100 code: BGOL
- IBNR: 8013481
- Category: 6
- Fare zone: VBB: Berlin C and Potsdam B/5851
- Website: www.bahnhof.de

History
- Opened: 1 September 1902; 123 years ago

Services
Preceding station	DB Regio Nordost	Following station
Hennigsdorf towards Oranienburg	RB 20	Potsdam Park Sanssouci towards Potsdam Griebnitzsee
Marquardt towards Berlin Gesundbrunnen	RB 21	Potsdam Park Sanssouci towards Potsdam Hbf
Potsdam Pirschheide towards Königs Wusterhausen	RB 22	Potsdam Park Sanssouci towards Potsdam Griebnitzsee
Terminus	RB 23	Potsdam Park Sanssouci towards Potsdam Griebnitzsee or Berlin Ostbahnhof
Location

Golm station is a railway station in the district of Golm in the city of Potsdam, Brandenburg, Germany. The rail and bus services here connect passengers to the University of Potsdam, as well as to the nearby Potsdam Science Park research center.

== Train services ==
In the 2026 timetable the following lines stop at the station:

Line	Route
RB 20	Oranienburg – Birkenwerder – Hohen Neuendorf West – Hennigsdorf – Golm – Potsdam Park Sanssouci – Potsdam Charlottenhof – Potsdam Hbf – Potsdam Griebnitzsee
RB 21	Berlin Gesundbrunnen – Berlin Jungfernheide – Berlin-Spandau – Berlin-Staaken – Dallgow-Döberitz – Elstal – Wustermark – Priort – Marquardt – Golm – Potsdam Park Sanssouci – Potsdam Charlottenhof – Potsdam Hbf
RB 22	Königs Wusterhausen – BER Airport – Ludwigsfelde-Struveshof – Saarmund – Potsdam Pirschheide – Golm – Potsdam Park Sanssouci – Potsdam Charlottenhof – Potsdam Hbf – Potsdam Griebnitzsee
RB 23	Golm – Potsdam Park Sanssouci – Potsdam Charlottenhof – Potsdam Hbf – Potsdam Griebnitzsee (– Berlin-Wannsee – Berlin-Charlottenburg – Berlin Zoologischer Garten – Berlin Hbf – Berlin Friedrichstraße – Berlin Ostbahnhof)

These trains connect Golm with Potsdam Hbf three times per hour during weekdays, and two times per hour during weekends. RB 23 runs hourly between Golm and Potsdam Griebnitzsee. During peak hours, trains continue from Griebnitzsee to Berlin Ostbahnhof.
