= BER Airport station =

Railway station at the Airport BER in Berlin, Germany

✈ Flughafen BER
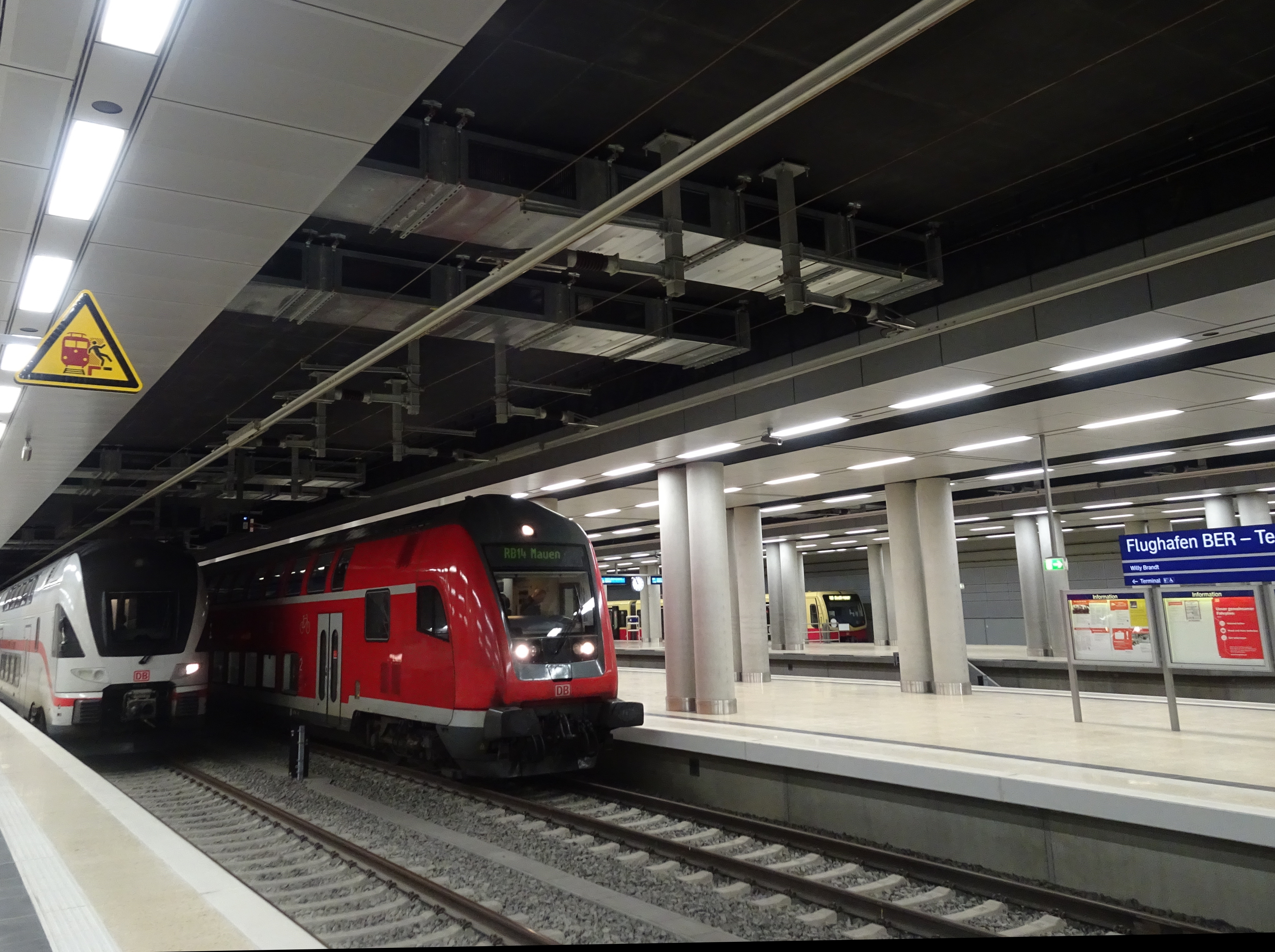
- BER Airport station with IC, RB and S-Bahn trains

General information
- Location: Melli-Beese-Ring; 12529 Schönefeld; Brandenburg; Germany
- Coordinates: 52°21′52.81″N 13°30′38.88″E
- Owner: Deutsche Bahn
- Operator: DB InfraGO
- Lines: Glasower Damm Ost–Bohnsdorf Süd railway; Grünauer Kreuz–Berlin Brandenburg Airport
- Platforms: 3 island platforms
- Tracks: 6 (2 S-Bahn, 4 Regional/long distance)
- Connections: X7 X71 734 735 736 N7 N60 BER1 BER2

Construction
- Structure type: Underground

Other information
- Station code: 8192
- DS100 code: BFBI/BFBB (S-Bahn)
- IBNR: 8011201
- Category: 2
- Fare zone: Verkehrsverbund Berlin-Brandenburg (VBB)
- Website: www.bahnhof.de

History
- Opened: 26 October 2020; 6 years ago
Services
Preceding station	DB Fernverkehr	Following station
Berlin Südkreuz towards Rostock Hbf	IC 17	Reverses direction
Elsterwerda towards Chemnitz Hbf	IC 17	Reverses direction
Preceding station	DB Regio Nordost	Following station
Berlin Ostkreuz towards Berlin Hbf or Berlin-Charlottenburg	Flughafen-Express	Terminus
Terminus	RE 2 Limited service	Königs Wusterhausen towards Cottbus Hbf
Berlin Südkreuz towards Berlin Hbf	RE 20	Königs Wusterhausen towards Lübbenau (Spreewald) or Cottbus Hbf
Ludwigsfelde-Struveshof towards Potsdam Griebnitzsee	RB 22	Königs Wusterhausen Terminus
Berlin-Schöneweide towards Eberswalde Hbf	RB 24	Blankenfelde towards Wünsdorf-Waldstadt
Berlin-Schöneweide towards Oranienburg	RB 32	Birkengrund towards Ludwigsfelde
Preceding station	Berlin S-Bahn	Following station
Waßmannsdorf towards Südkreuz	S45	Terminus
Waßmannsdorf towards Spandau	S9	Terminus
Location

BER Airport station (German: Bahnhof Flughafen BER), previously titled before December 2023 as Flughafen BER – Terminal 1-2 station, is a railway station located under the main terminal of Berlin Brandenburg Airport, Germany serving its Terminals 1 and 2. Most train services are operated by Deutsche Bahn, which provides long-distance and regional connections while S-Bahn Berlin offers suburban lines. This station is open 24/7.

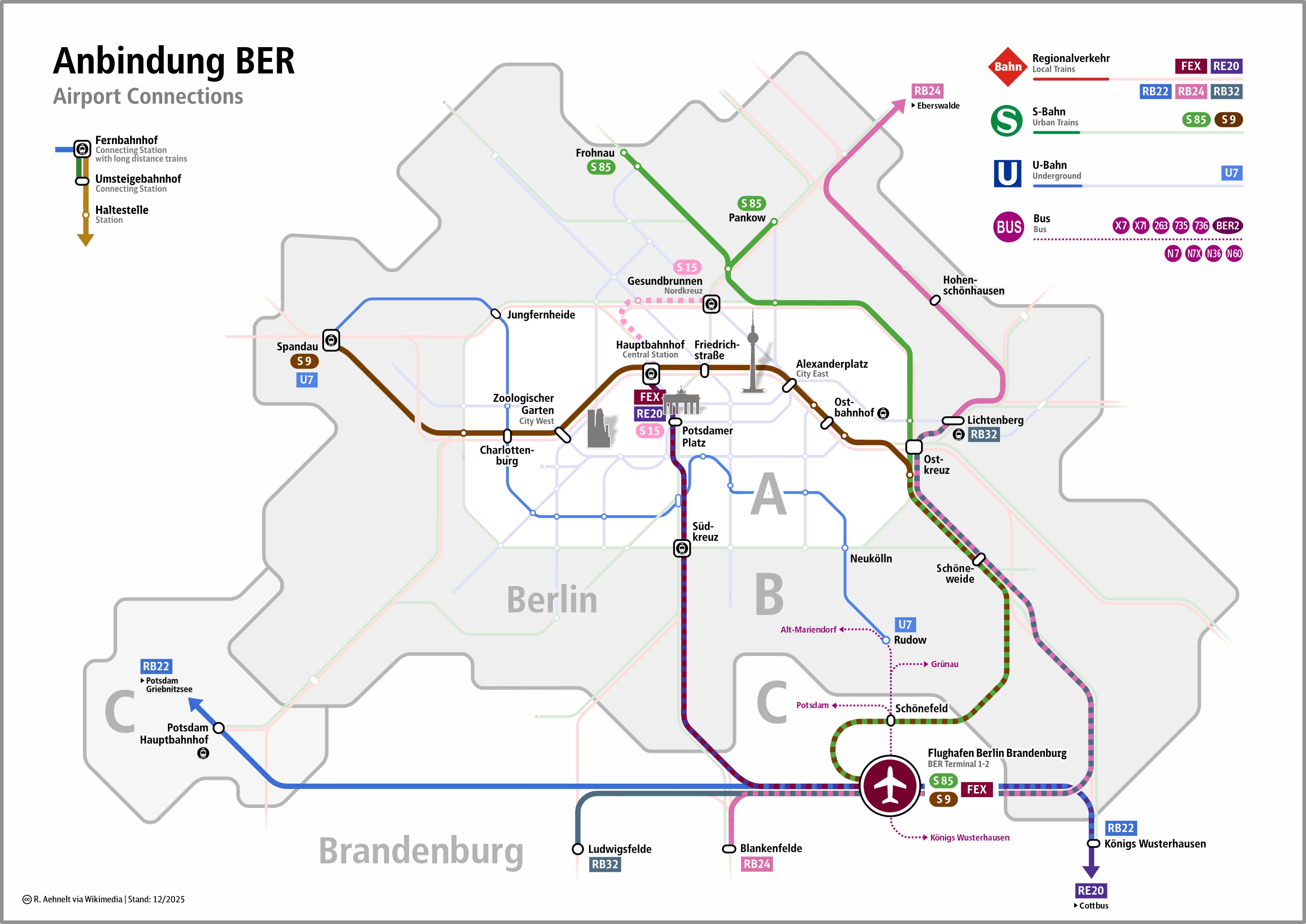
Map of railway connections at Berlin Brandenburg Airport. An express line (FEX) serves Berlin Hauptbahnhof in 22 minutes.

== Overview ==
The station is located in a 3.1-kilometre-long (1.9 mi) tunnel, on the Glasower Damm Ost–Bohnsdorf Süd railway and the Grünauer Kreuz–Berlin Brandenburg Airport railway, both of which branch off the Berlin–Görlitz railway; the Glasower Damm Ost–Bohnsdorf Süd railway also branched off the Berlin outer ring. It is in the municipal territory of Schönefeld, just outside Berlin.

== History ==
Construction of the station began in 2007 and the construction of the tunnels was completed on 25 June 2009. The station was handed over to Deutsche Bahn on 30 March 2010 and has been electrified since 7 June 2011. The public clients agreed to pay a fixed price of 285 million euros, although the actual construction cost was well below that number. While the airport itself was not in operation, empty trains were running through the tunnels to drive out humidity. DB ultimately sued the airport for damages due to the unused station. The station was opened for regular passenger traffic on 26 October 2020, a few days before opening of the airport.

The station is served by Berlin S-Bahn, Regional-Express and InterCity services. The station lies directly under the airport terminal and has six platforms. Two of these are terminating platforms for the S-Bahn lines S85 and S9. The airport is connected with Berlin Hauptbahnhof (Berlin main station) by the Airport Express (FEX), with a journey time of 22 minutes as well as slower regional and suburban connections. Upgrades on the Berlin Dresden railway enabled faster and more frequent FEX, RE and IC service in 2025. Since then two stops at Potsdamer Platz and Berlin Südkreuz are served by the Airport Express (FEX), which makes the trip to Berlin Hauptbahnhof (Berlin main station) in 22 minutes. Until then, the Airport Express (FEX) ran via Berlin-Gesundbrunnen and Ostkreuz.

Deutsche Bahn confirmed in August 2011 that multiple daily Intercity-Express and InterCity trains will connect the airport to Bielefeld, Hannover, Hamburg, Dresden and Wolfsburg. EuroCity trains will also connect to Wrocław and Kraków in Poland and Amsterdam in the Netherlands. After the delayed opening, it is not clear when this will happen. Currently there is only an InterCity train to Dresden and Rostock.

Due to the closure of Terminal 5, the station was renamed Flughafen BER station in December 2023, reflecting it is now the sole station serving the airport.

== Train services ==
The station was served by the following regular services in 2026:

Line	Route	Frequency
IC 17	Rostock – Neustrelitz – Berlin Hbf – BER Airport – Dresden – Chemnitz	Every two hours
FEX	Airport Express; BER Airport – Berlin Südkreuz – Berlin Potsdamer Platz – Berlin Hbf	15 min
FEX	BER Airport – Berlin Ostkreuz – Berlin Ostbahnhof – Berlin Alexanderplatz – Berlin Hbf – Charlottenburg	Some nighttime services
RE 2	BER Airport – Königs Wusterhausen – Cottbus	One nighttime service
RE 20	Berlin Hbf – Potsdamer Platz – Südkreuz – BER Airport – Königs Wusterhausen – Lübbenau (Spreewald) (– Vetschau – Cottbus)	60 min
RB 22	Königs Wusterhausen – BER Airport – Ludwigsfelde-Struveshof – Saarmund – Potsdam – Pirschheide – Golm – Potsdam Park Sanssouci – Potsdam Charlottenhof – Potsdam Hbf – Potsdam Griebnitzsee	60 min
RB 24	Eberswalde – Bernau – Berlin-Lichtenberg – Berlin Ostkreuz – Berlin-Schöneweide – BER Airport – Blankenfelde – Dahlewitz – Rangsdorf – Dabendorf – Zossen – Wünsdorf-Waldstadt	60 min
RB 32	Oranienburg – Berlin-Lichtenberg – Berlin Ostkreuz – Berlin-Schöneweide – BER Airport – Birkengrund – Ludwigsfelde	60 min
S9	BER Airport – Schönefeld – Schöneweide – Warschauer Straße – Ostbahnhof – Alexanderplatz – Friedrichstraße – Hauptbahnhof – Zoologischer Garten – Charlottenburg – Westkreuz – Spandau	20 min
S45	BER Airport – Schönefeld – Schöneweide – Neukölln – Hermannstraße – Tempelhof – Südkreuz	20 min

== Gallery ==
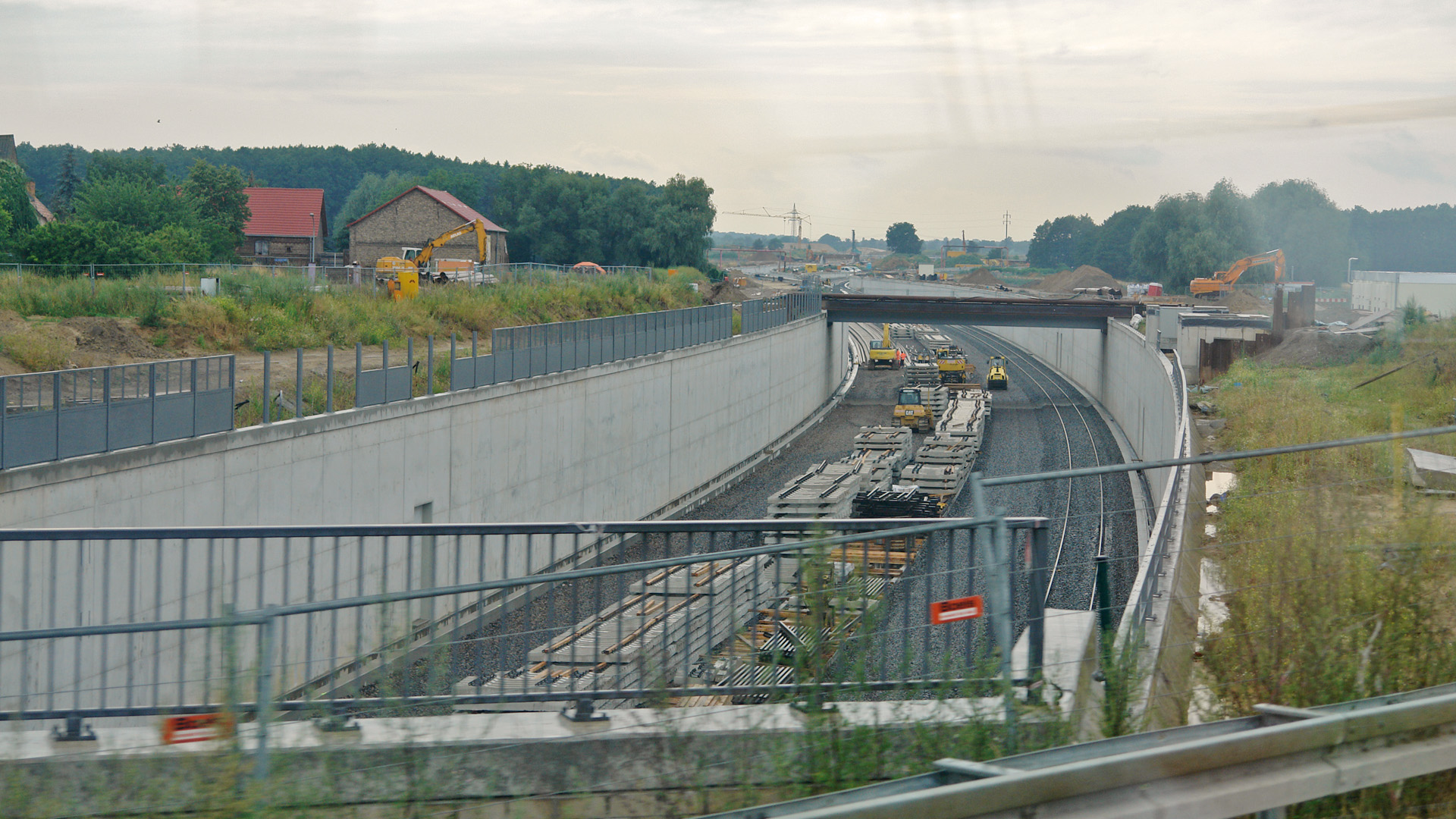
Construction work at the entrance of the rail tunnel (July 2010)

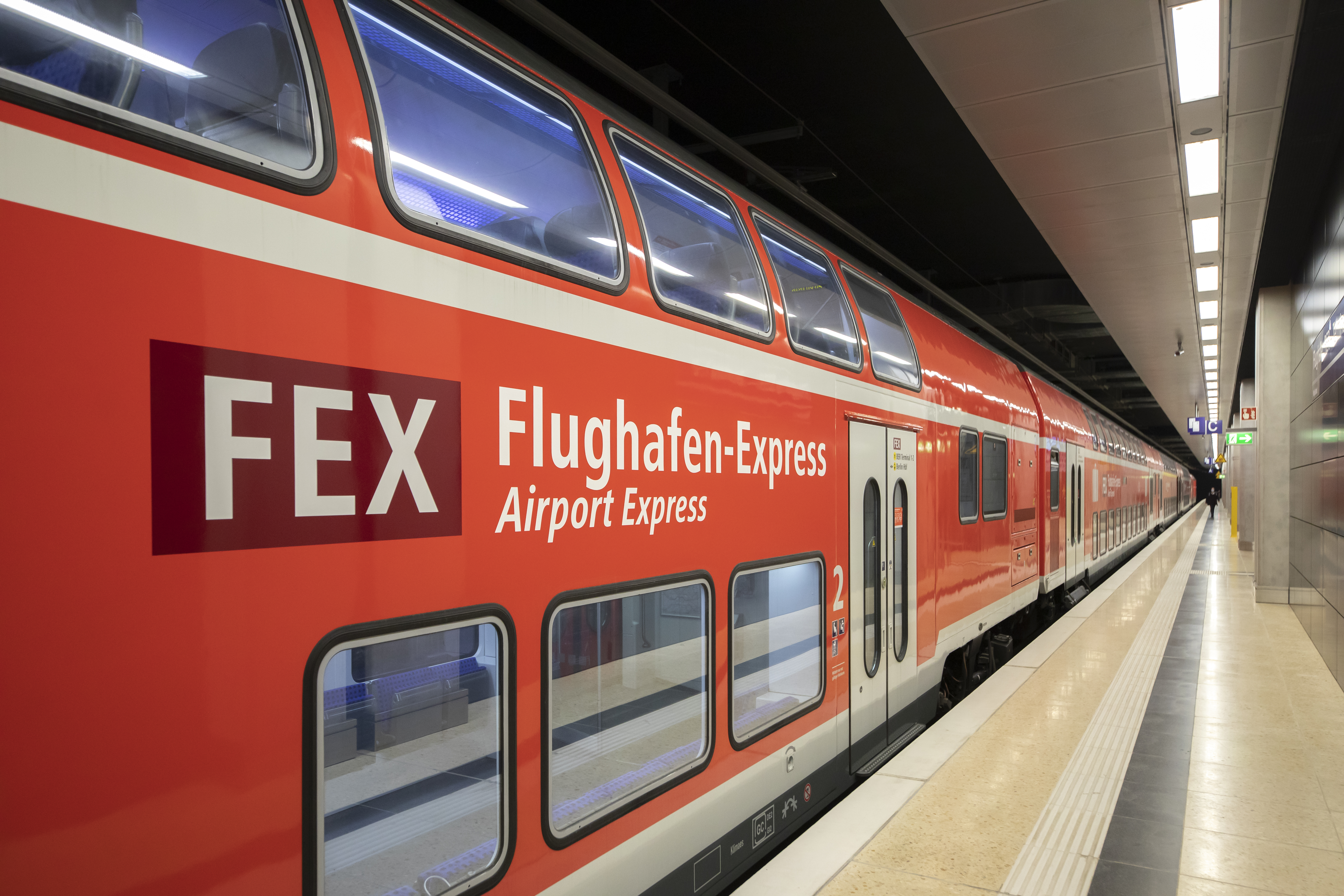
Airport express train

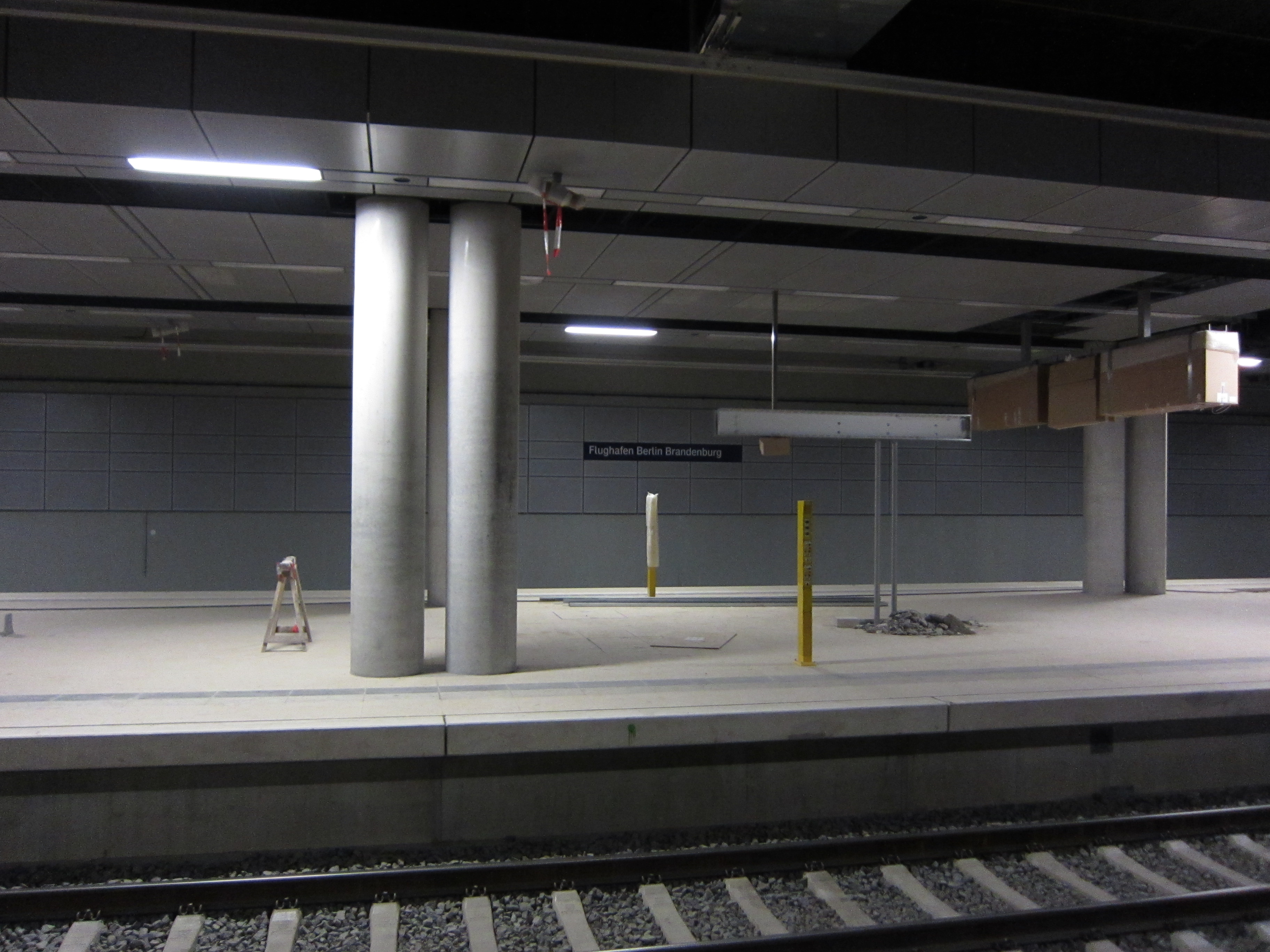
Platform track 2 and sign

== See also ==
- Airport rail link
- List of railway stations in the Berlin area
- Rail transport in Germany
