= Potsdam Griebnitzsee station =

S-Bahn station in Potsdam, Brandenburg, Germany

Griebnitzsee
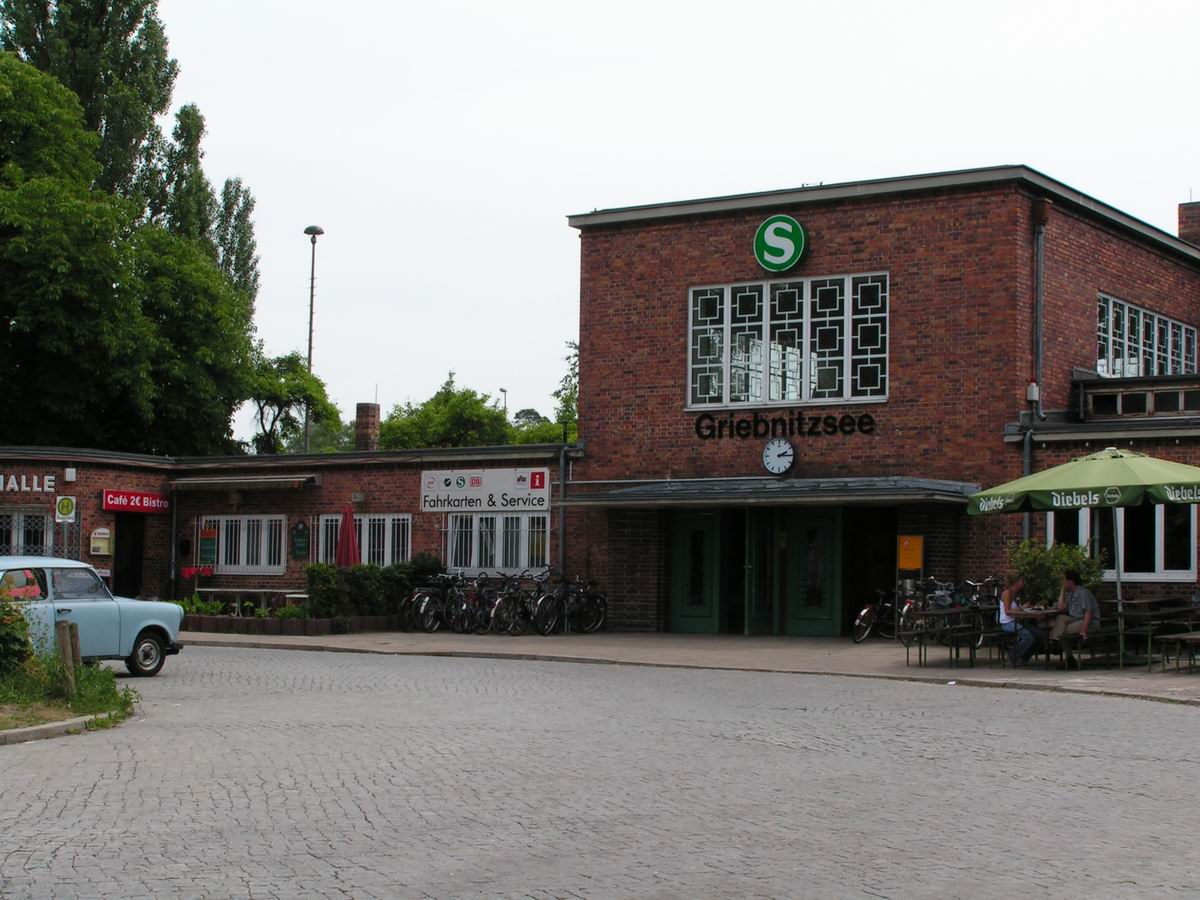
- Station building, 2005

General information
- Location: Rudolf-Breitscheid-Str. 201, Griebnitzsee, Potsdam, Brandenburg; Germany
- Coordinates: 52°23′40″N 13°7′38″E
- Owner: DB Netz
- Operator: DB Station&Service
- Lines: Wannsee Railway (KBS 200.7); Berlin–Magdeburg (KBS 209.21, 209.22)
- Platforms: 2 side platforms (long distance); 1 island platform (S-Bahn)
- Tracks: 5

Construction
- Accessible: Yes
- Architect: Günter Lüttich

Other information
- Station code: 2268
- DS100 code: BGRI
- IBNR: 8080530
- Category: 4
- Fare zone: : Berlin C and Potsdam B/5851
- Website: www.bahnhof.de; s-bahn-berlin.de

History
- Opened: 1 June 1874

Passengers
- 13,000 (daily)

Services
Preceding station	DB Regio Nordost	Following station
Potsdam Hbf towards Oranienburg	RB 20	Terminus
Potsdam Hbf towards Königs Wusterhausen	RB 22	Terminus
Potsdam Hbf towards Golm	RB 23	Wannsee towards Berlin Ostbahnhof
Preceding station	Berlin S-Bahn	Following station
Babelsberg towards Potsdam Hbf	S7	Wannsee towards Ahrensfelde
Location

Potsdam-Griebnitzsee station is a regional and S-Bahn station in Potsdam on the outskirts of Berlin in the German state of Brandenburg. The station is located in the east of the Babelsberg suburb of the city of Potsdam in the state of Brandenburg, and about 600 metres (2,000 ft) outside the Berlin city boundary. It takes its name from the adjacent Griebnitzsee lake. It is on the Wannsee Railway. During the division of Germany, it served as a border station for traffic to West Berlin. The station is now served by trains on line S7 of the Berlin S-Bahn and Regionalbahn services RB 20, RB 22, and RB 23. It is classified by Deutsche Bahn as a category 4 station.

A historic rectifier to the east of the station building used to houses the Berlin S-Bahn Museum but that has now moved to Lichtenberg S-Bahn station. Nearby are the University of Potsdam and the Hasso Plattner Institute.

== History ==
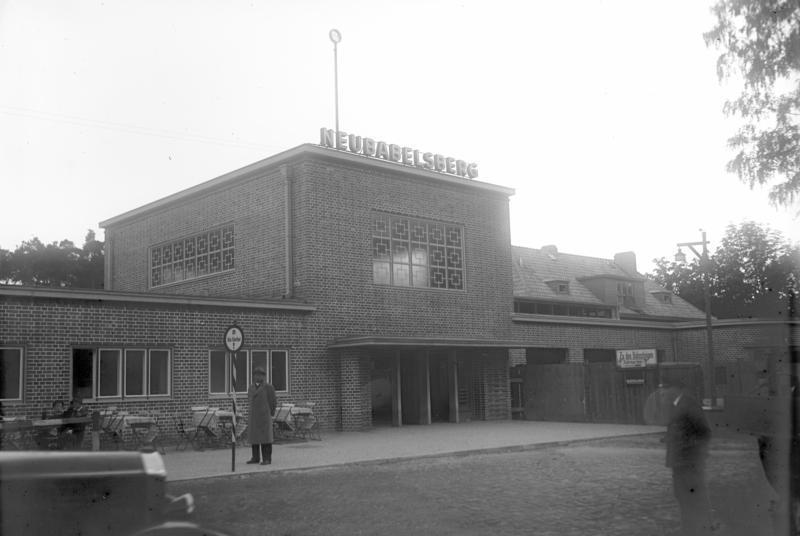
The station in 1931

The station was built in 1874 on the Berlin–Potsdam railway to promote the development of the residential area of Neubabelsberg; it was therefore originally called Neubabelsberg. It went into operation on 1 June of the same year.

The first station building was a wooden pavilion that had been rebuilt from the German House designed by Walter Kyllmann and Adolf Heyden for the Weltausstellung 1873 Wien (Vienna World Exhibition). The current station building was designed by Günter Lüttich in 1931. The station was renamed Babelsberg Ufastadt on 1 April 1938.

At the end of the Second World War, the Teltow Canal bridge at Kohlhasenbrück was blown up so that there were no rail operations between Zehlendorf and Babelsberg Ufastadt from April 1945 to 15 June 1948.

=== Border station ===
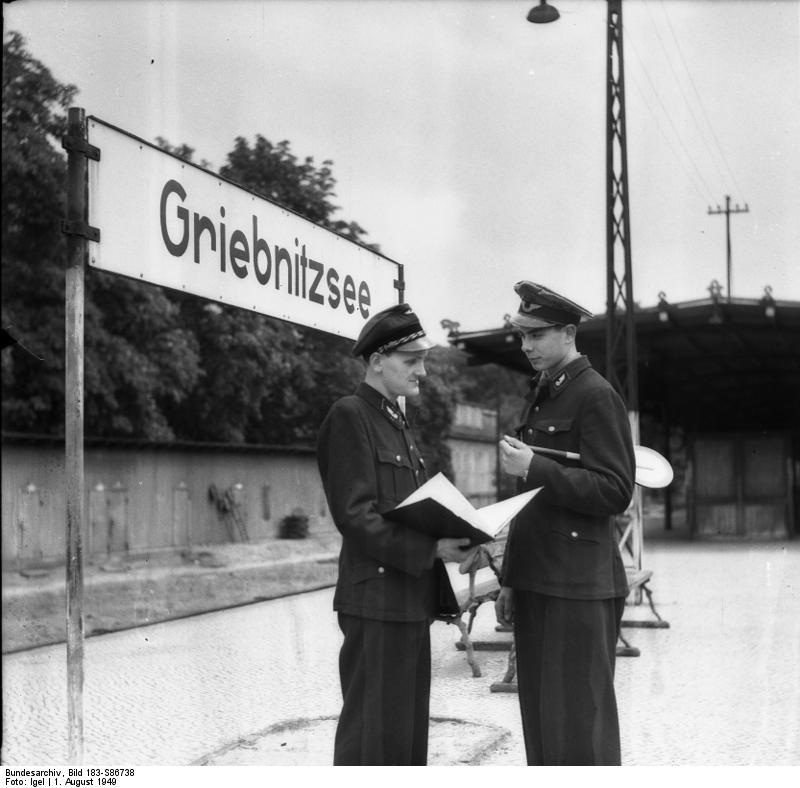
Griebnitzsee station in 1949 as a FDJ "youth station" (Jugendbahnhof)

The station’s name was changed again to Griebnitzsee in 1949. Griebnitzsee station functioned as a border control point from 1952. From 1961 to 1989, the station was closed for regional passenger traffic and was a border station and a border checkpoint from East Germany (GDR) until 1990. Access at Griebnitzsee station to transit traffic through the GDR to and from West Berlin was not allowed.

The station handled interzonal traffic between West and East Germany via the Berlin Stadtbahn. Later, interzonal trains ran on the Berlin outer ring (including train pairs on the Aachen–Potsdam–Görlitz and Munich–Leipzig–Potsdam–Rostock routes), so it became a crossing exclusively for transit traffic between West Berlin (Berlin-Wannsee, Zoologischer Garten and Friedrichstrasse) and West Germany, to/from:

- Schwanheide/Büchen (to/from Hamburg and northern Germany) until 1976
- Marienborn/Helmstedt (Hannover and West Germany)
- Gerstungen/Bebra (Hesse, Frankfurt, Saarbrücken)
- Probstzella/Ludwigsstadt (southern Germany, Nuremberg, Munich, Stuttgart)
- Gutenfürst/Hof (Regensburg, Munich) from October 1972.

It also handled international transport, including from Paris to Warsaw (running between Helmstedt and Berlin as transit trains).

Until the construction of the Berlin Wall on 13 August 1961 and from 1990, travel was permitted between West Berlin and East Germany on the Berlin S-Bahn. As of 1952, travel across the border was allowed only with permission and banned for residents of West Berlin. From 1953 to 1958 (when the Berlin outer ring was completed), there were through trains (Durchläuferzüge) between Potsdam and East Berlin that ran through West Berlin without stopping.

Since the station was near the border with West Berlin, it was heavily secured and guarded. This included the monitoring of the access routes to prevent unauthorised embarkation of passengers (Republikflucht). At the station there was also a post with guard dogs so that the under parts of the trains could be searched for hidden people. Initially, border controls were carried out on stationary trains. Later, the border policemen boarded (trains towards West Germany) or disembarked here (from trains towards Berlin) and carried out border controls on moving trains (Transitzüge—transit trains—from 1972).

On 18 April 1962, two graduates of the NPA officer school attempting to leave East Germany were involved in a shootout on the station premises, resulting in refugee Peter Boehme and border policeman Jörgen Schmidtchen being shot.

=== Since 1990 ===
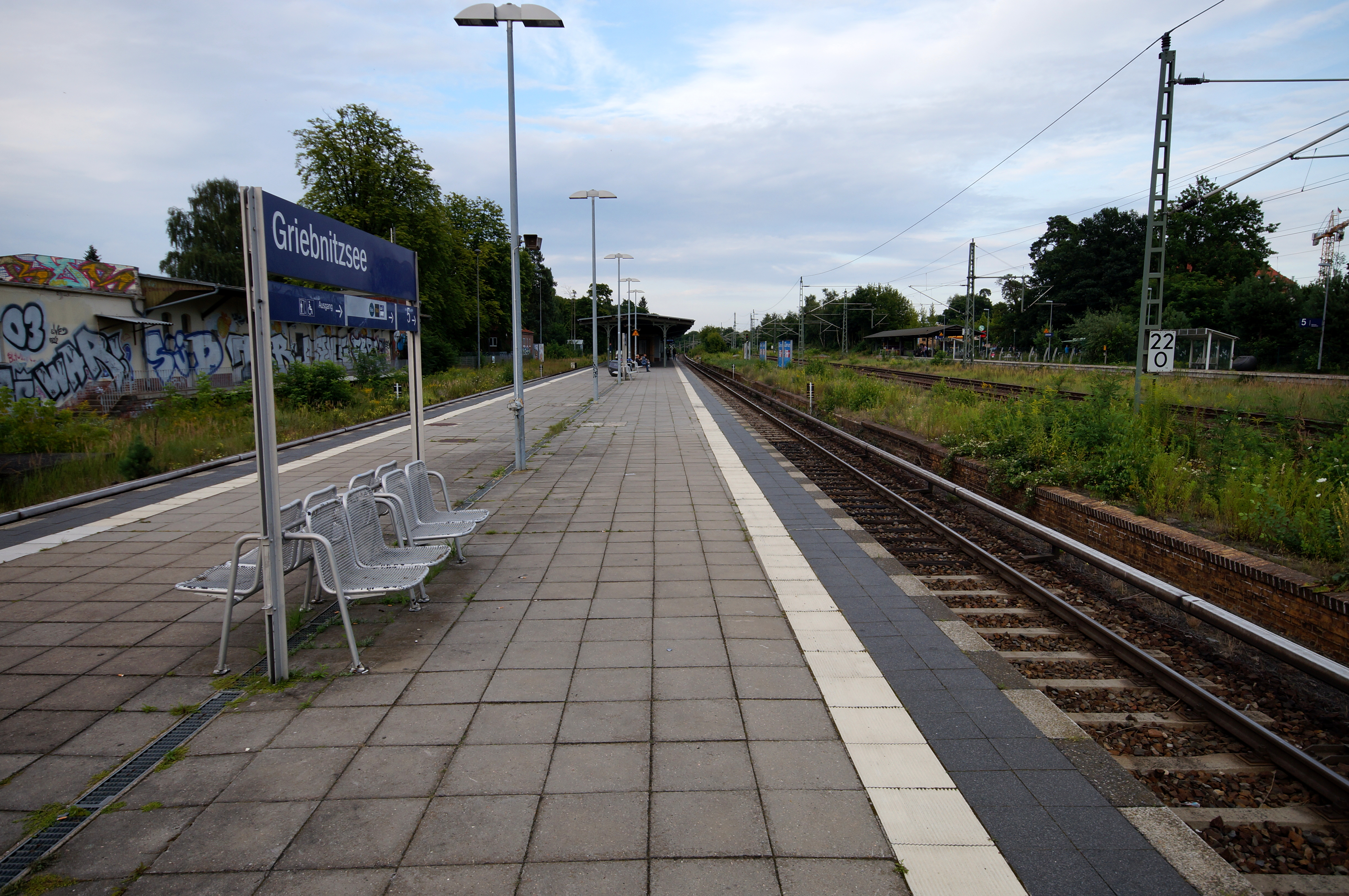
The platforms of Griebnitzsee station

Since 1990, the station has been open to the public again. With the resumption of traffic between Wannsee and Potsdam on 1 April 1992, the rail platform was restored to service. A new platform canopy and a second entrance were built. In 2000, the station hall was renovated for about 4.5 million Deutsche Marks.

Today the station is particularly frequented by students. The Babelsberg campus of the University of Potsdam is very close to the station. It includes the Institute of Computer Science, the Hasso Plattner Institute, the Economics and Social Sciences Faculty and the Babelsberg film school.

Operations at the station (apart from the S-Bahn) were very restricted because regional traffic could only utilise a single side platform next to the double-track main line. This meant that trains from Berlin to Potsdam could not stop at Griebnitzsee station. A second regional platform was originally planned to be built in 2013, but this was delayed several times. Finally, the platform went into operation at the timetable change in December 2016. Around €3 million was spent on the 140-metre-long platform and installing a lift.

The station is now a heritage-listed building.

The station's DS-100 code is BBAB and its station code is 237.

== Train services ==
In the 2026 timetable the following lines stop at the station:

Line	Route	Frequency
RB 20	Oranienburg – Birkenwerder – Hohen Neuendorf West – Hennigsdorf – Golm – Park Sanssouci – Charlottenhof – Potsdam – Griebnitzsee	Hourly
RB 22	Griebnitzsee – Potsdam – Charlottenhof – Park Sanssouci – Golm – Pirschheide – Saarmund – Ludwigsfelde-Struveshof – Airport – Königs Wusterhausen	Hourly
RB 23	Golm – Park Sanssouci – Charlottenhof – Potsdam – Griebnitzsee (– Wannsee – Charlottenburg – Zoologischer Garten – Berlin – Friedrichstraße – Alexanderplatz – Ostbahnhof)	Hourly
S7	Potsdam – Griebnitzsee – Wannsee – Westkreuz – Hauptbahnhof – Alexanderplatz – Ostbahnhof – Lichtenberg – Ahrensfelde	10 min

== See also ==
- List of railway stations in Brandenburg
