= Potsdam Charlottenhof station =

Railway station in Potsdam, Germany

Potsdam Charlottenhof
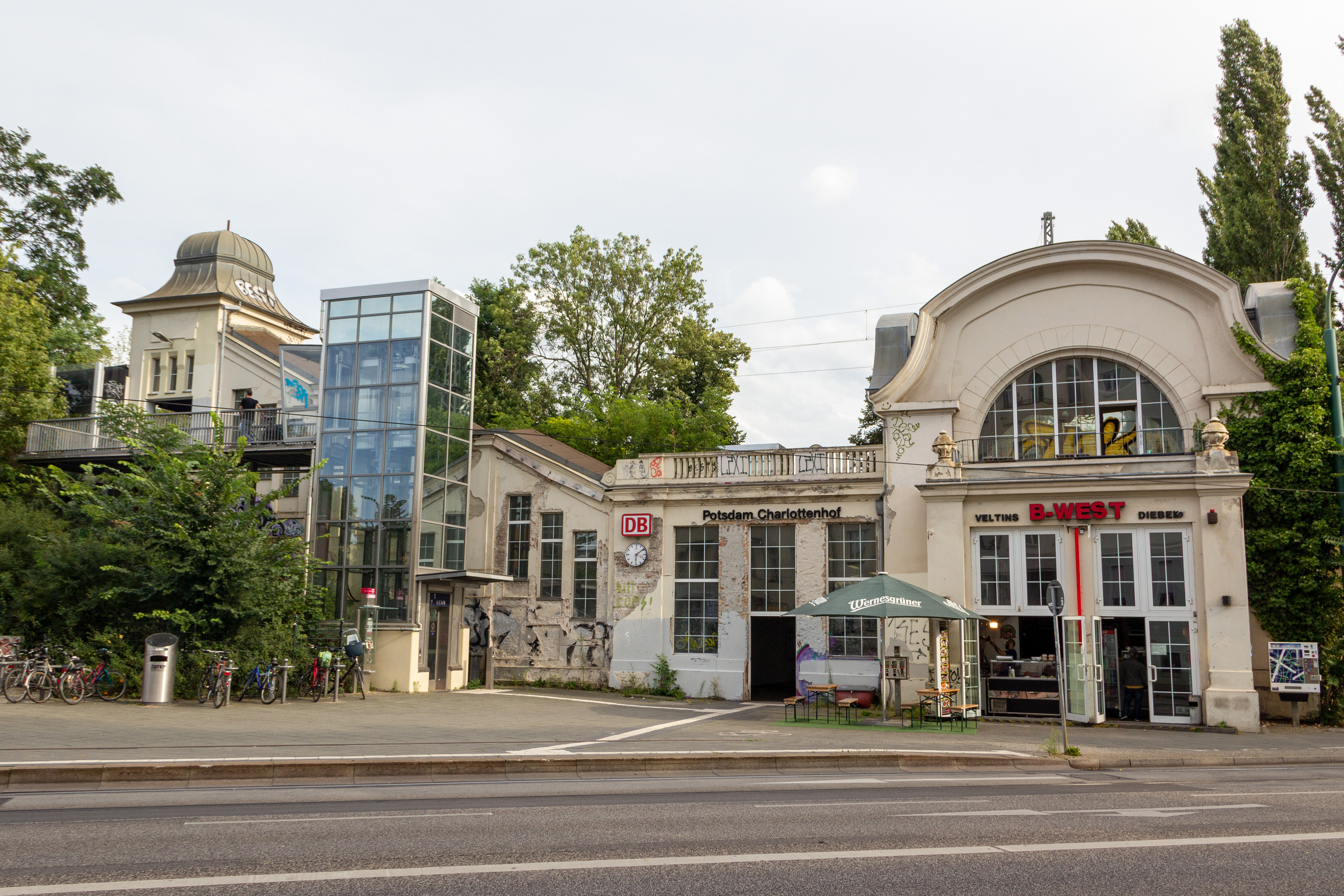

General information
- Location: Zeppelinstraße 146; 14471 Potsdam; Brandenburg; Germany
- Coordinates: 52.3928°N 13.0364°E
- Owner: DB Netz
- Operator: DB Station&Service
- Line: Berlin–Magdeburg railway
- Train operators: DB Regio Nordost; Ostdeutsche Eisenbahn

Construction
- Accessible: Yes

Other information
- Station code: 5010
- DS100 code: BPDC
- IBNR: 8010280
- Category: 4
- Fare zone: VBB: Berlin C and Potsdam A/5750
- Website: www.bahnhof.de

History
- Opened: 1 October 1887; 138 years ago

Services
Preceding station	Ostdeutsche Eisenbahn	Following station
Potsdam Park Sanssouci towards Brandenburg Hbf	RE 1	Potsdam Hbf towards Frankfurt (Oder)
Preceding station	DB Regio Nordost	Following station
Potsdam Park Sanssouci towards Oranienburg	RB 20	Potsdam Hbf towards Potsdam Griebnitzsee
Potsdam Park Sanssouci towards Potsdam Hbf	RB 21	Potsdam Hbf towards Berlin Gesundbrunnen
Potsdam Park Sanssouci towards Königs Wusterhausen	RB 22	Potsdam Hbf towards Potsdam Griebnitzsee
Potsdam Park Sanssouci towards Golm	RB 23	Potsdam Hbf towards Potsdam Griebnitzsee or Berlin Ostbahnhof
Preceding station	Ostdeutsche Eisenbahn	Following station
Potsdam Pirschheide towards Potsdam Hbf	RB 33	Potsdam Hbf towards Jüterbog
Location

Potsdam Charlottenhof is a railway station in the city of Potsdam, the state capital of Brandenburg, Germany. The ensemble is a protected monument.
