= Marquardt station =

Railway station in Marquardt, Germany

Marquardt
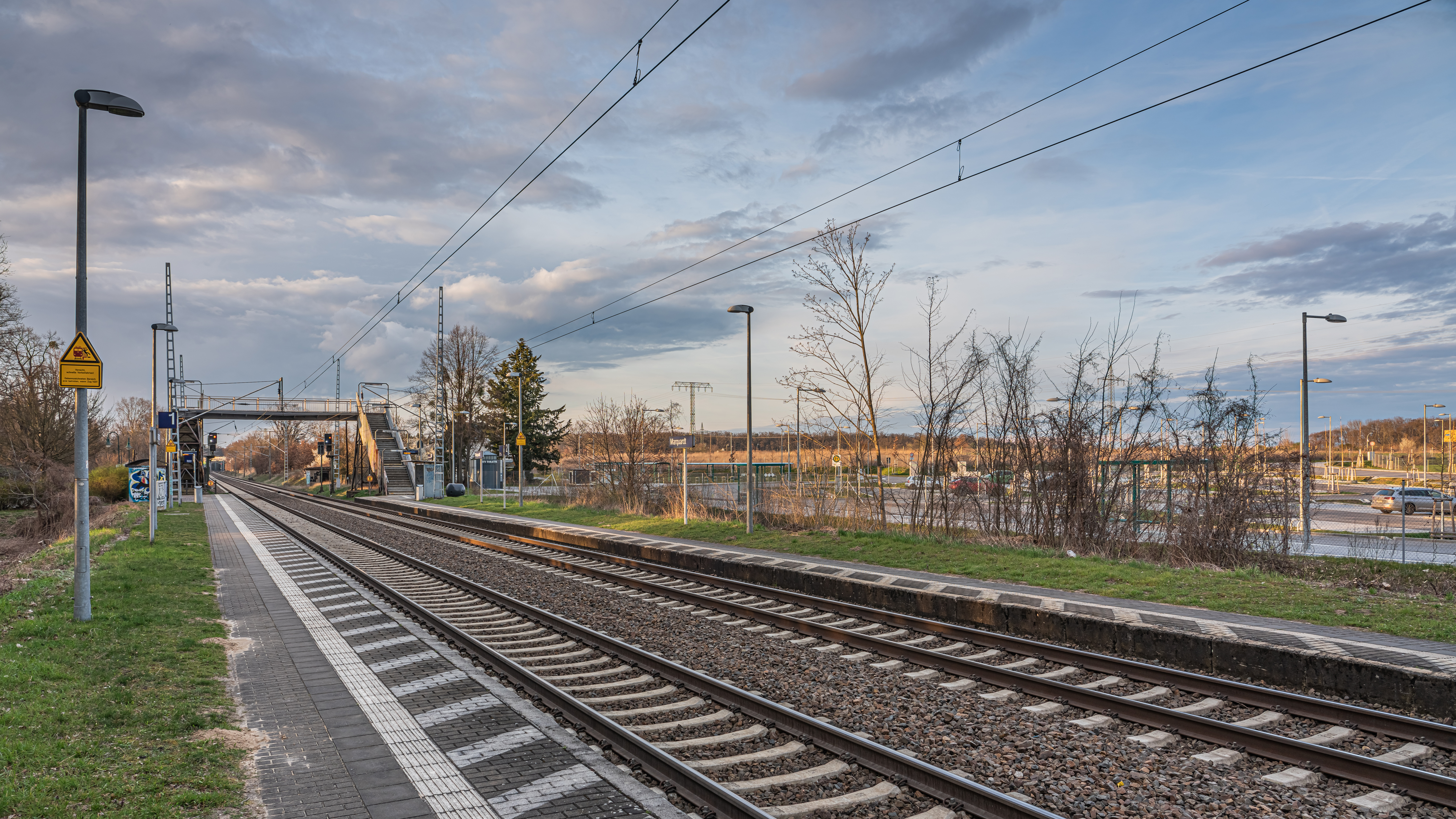
- 2024

General information
- Location: Fahrländer Straße 1A; 14476 Potsdam; Brandenburg; Germany
- Coordinates: 52.4584°N 12.9719°E
- Owner: DB Netz
- Operator: DB Station&Service
- Lines: Berlin outer ring Jüterbog–Nauen railway
- Platforms: 2 side platforms
- Tracks: 2
- Train operators: DB Regio Nordost

Other information
- Station code: 3986
- DS100 code: BMQU
- IBNR: 8012315
- Category: 5
- Fare zone: VBB: Berlin C and Potsdam B/5851
- Website: www.bahnhof.de

History
- Opened: 17 August 1937; 89 years ago

Services
Preceding station	DB Regio Nordost	Following station
Priort towards Potsdam Hbf	RB 21	Golm towards Berlin Gesundbrunnen
Location

Marquardt station is a railway station in the district of Marquardt in the city of Potsdam, Brandenburg, Germany. It is served by the line RB 21.
