= Hangelsberg station =

Train station in Brandenburg, Germany

Hangelsberg
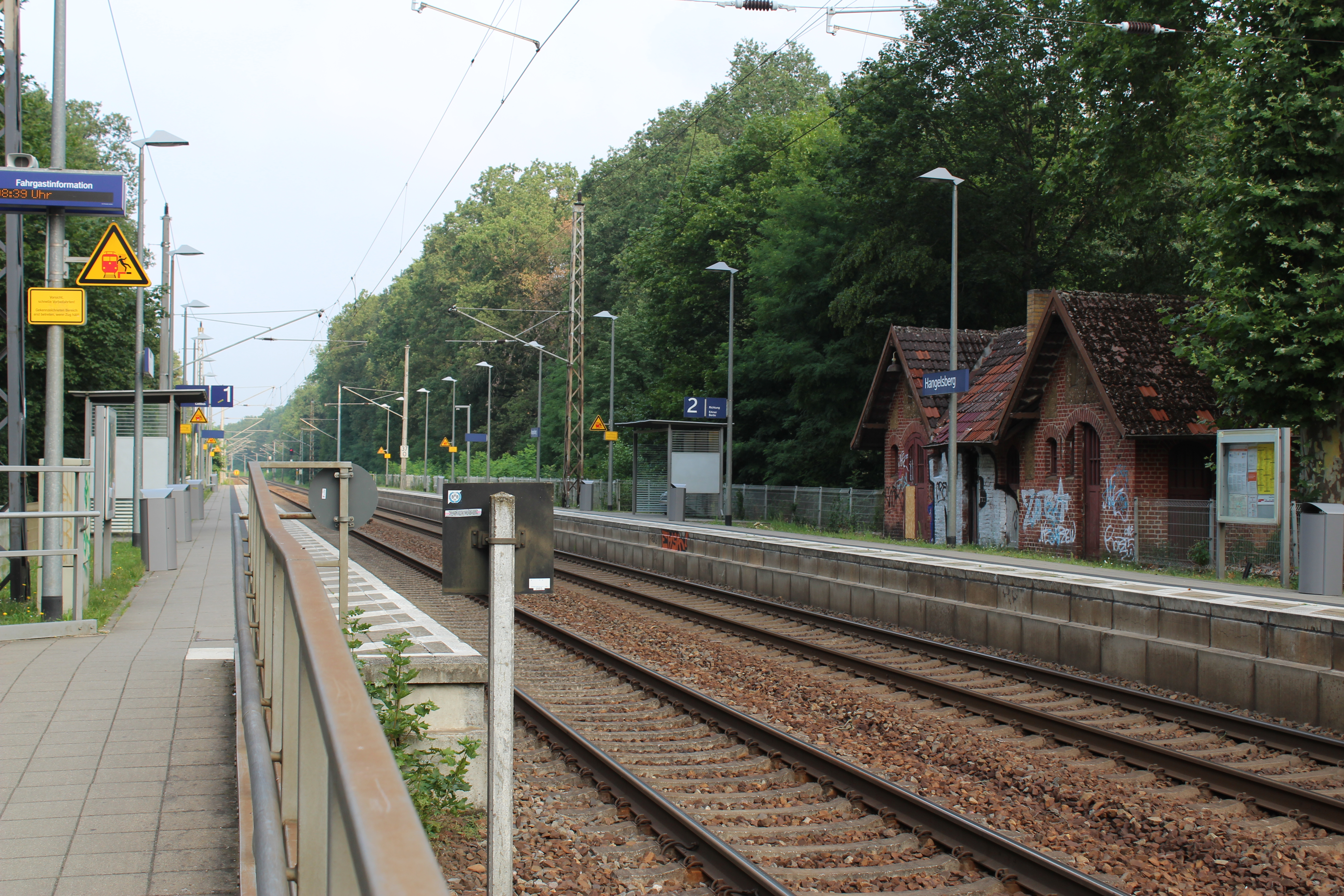
- 2019

General information
- Location: Am Bahnhof; 15537 Hangelsberg; Brandenburg; Germany
- Coordinates: 52°24′02″N 13°55′12″E
- Owner: Deutsche Bahn
- Operator: DB Station&Service
- Lines: Berlin–Wrocław railway (KBS 201)
- Platforms: 2 side platforms
- Tracks: 2
- Train operators: Ostdeutsche Eisenbahn
- Connections: RE 1

Construction
- Parking: yes
- Cycle facilities: no
- Accessible: yes

Other information
- Station code: 2542
- DS100 code: BHGB
- IBNR: 8011818
- Category: 6
- Fare zone: VBB: 5764
- Website: www.bahnhof.de

History
- Opened: October 1842; 183 years ago

Services
Preceding station	Ostdeutsche Eisenbahn	Following station
Fangschleuse towards Brandenburg Hbf	RE 1	Fürstenwalde (Spree) towards Frankfurt (Oder)
Location
- Location within Brandenburg Location within Germany Location within Europe

Hangelsberg station is a railway station in the municipality of Hangelsberg, located in the Oder-Spree district in Brandenburg, Germany.
