= Königs Wusterhausen station =

Railway station in Königs Wusterhausen, Germany

Königs Wusterhausen
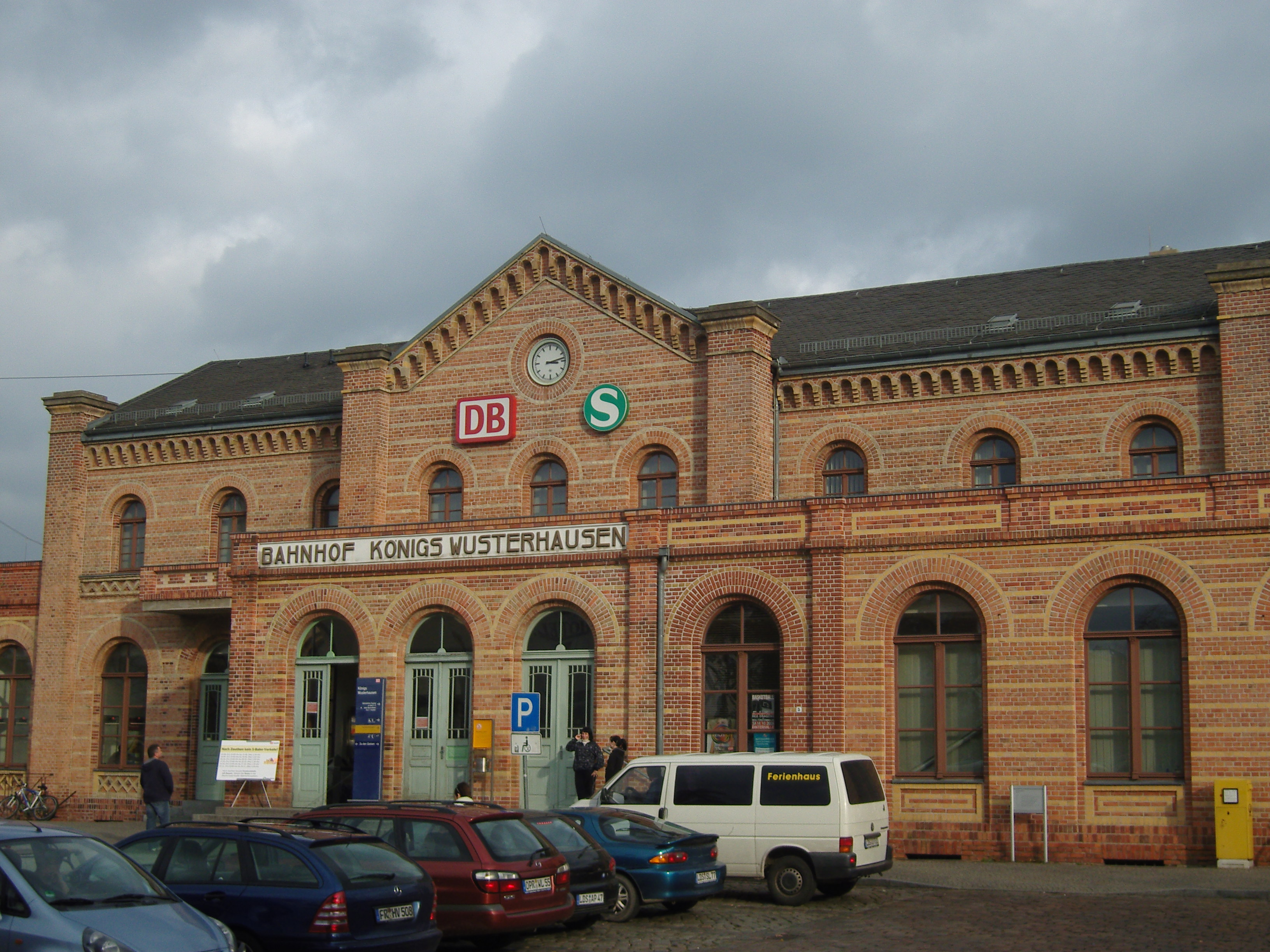
- Station building

General information
- Location: Königs Wusterhausen, Brandenburg; Germany
- Coordinates: 52°17′48″N 13°37′52″E
- Owner: Deutsche Bahn
- Operator: DB Netz; DB Station&Service
- Lines: Berlin–Görlitz (KBS 200.45–9)
- Platforms: 2 (long-distance and regional); 1 (S-Bahn)
- Connections: 721 722 723 724 727 728 729 730 733 735 736 737 739 790

Construction
- Accessible: Yes

Other information
- Station code: 3343
- DS100 code: BKW
- Category: 4
- Fare zone: VBB: Berlin C/6059
- Website: www.bahnhof.de

History
- Opened: 13 September 1866

Passengers
- 2,500 to 5,000 per day (DB 2006)

Services
Preceding station	DB Fernverkehr	Following station
Berlin Ostkreuz towards Norddeich Mole	IC 56	Lübben (Spreewald) towards Cottbus Hbf
Preceding station	Ostdeutsche Eisenbahn	Following station
Berlin Ostkreuz towards Nauen	RE 2	Brand Tropical Islands towards Cottbus Hbf
BER Airport Operated by DB One-way operation	RE 2	Brand Tropical Islands towards Cottbus Hbf
Preceding station	DB Regio Nordost	Following station
Berlin Ostkreuz towards Dessau Hbf	RE 7	Zeesen towards Senftenberg
BER Airport towards Berlin Hbf	RE 20	Lübben (Spreewald) towards Lübbenau (Spreewald) or Cottbus Hbf
BER Airport towards Potsdam Griebnitzsee	RB 22	Terminus
Preceding station	Niederbarnimer Eisenbahn	Following station
Terminus	RB 36	Niederlehme towards Frankfurt (Oder)
Preceding station	Berlin S-Bahn	Following station
Wildau towards Westend	S46	Terminus
Location

Königs Wusterhausen is a railway station for the town of Königs Wusterhausen in Brandenburg. It is the southern terminus of the S-Bahn line S46.

== Train services ==
In the 2026 timetable the following lines stop at the station:

Line	Route		Operator	Frequency (min)
IC 56	Norddeich Mole – Emden – Oldenburg – Bremen – Hannover – Berlin – Königs Wusterhausen – Cottbus		DB Fernverkehr	1 train pair
RE 2	Nauen – Berlin-Spandau – Berlin –	Königs Wusterhausen – Lübben (Spreew) – Cottbus	Ostdeutsche Eisenbahn	60
RE 2	BER Airport –	Königs Wusterhausen – Lübben (Spreew) – Cottbus	DB Regio	One nighttime service towards Cottbus
RE 7	Dessau – Bad Belzig – Michendorf – Berlin – Königs Wusterhausen – Lübbenau (Spreewald) – Senftenberg		DB Regio	60
RE 20	Berlin Hbf – Potsdamer Platz – Südkreuz – BER Airport – Königs Wusterhausen – Lübbenau (Spreewald) (– Vetschau – Cottbus)		DB Regio	60
RB 22	Königs Wusterhausen – BER Airport – Saarmund – Golm – Potsdam – Potsdam Griebnitzsee		DB Regio	60
RB 36	Königs Wusterhausen – Storkow (Mark) – Beeskow – Müllrose – Frankfurt (Oder)		Niederbarnimer Eisenbahn	60
S46	Westend – Westkreuz – Innsbrucker Platz – Südkreuz – Neukölln – Schöneweide – Grünau – Königs Wusterhausen		Berlin S-Bahn	20
