= Berlin-Johannisthal station =

Railway station in Treptow-Köpenick, Germany

Berlin Johannisthal
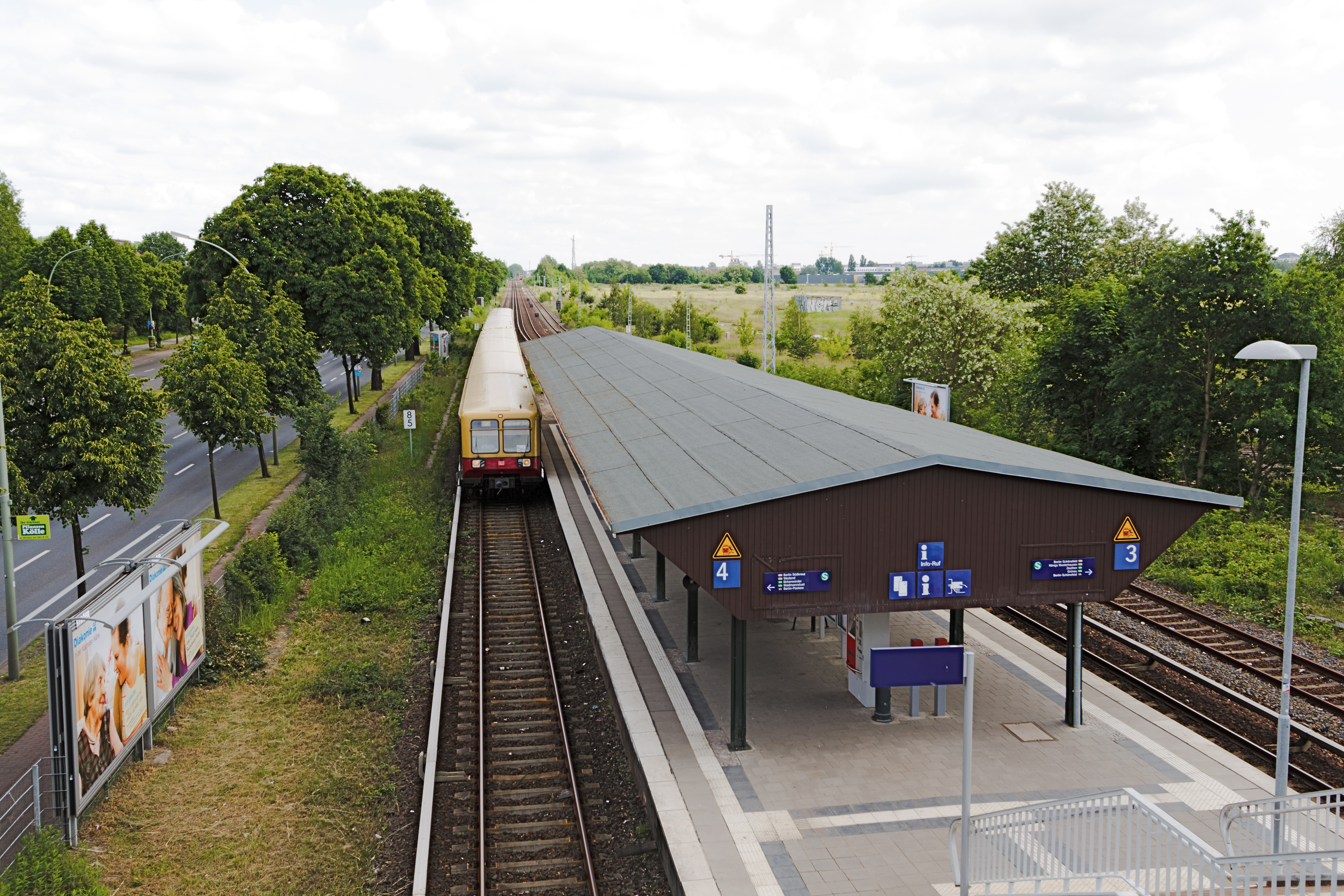
- Station in 2014

General information
- Location: Adlergestell 103, Treptow-Köpenick, Berlin, Berlin; Germany
- Coordinates: 52°26′48″N 13°31′26″E
- Owner: DB Netz
- Operator: DB Station&Service
- Lines: Berlin–Görlitz (KBS 200.45–9)
- Platforms: 1 island platform
- Tracks: 2
- Train operators: S-Bahn Berlin
- Connections: S45 S46 S8 S85 S9

Other information
- Station code: 595
- DS100 code: BSCF
- IBNR: 8089007
- Category: 4
- Fare zone: VBB: Berlin B/5656
- Website: www.bahnhof.de

History
- Opened: 11 July 1945

Services
Preceding station	Berlin S-Bahn	Following station
Schöneweide towards Südkreuz	S45	Adlershof towards BER Airport
Schöneweide towards Westend	S46	Adlershof towards Königs Wusterhausen
Schöneweide towards Birkenwerder	S8	Adlershof towards Wildau
Schöneweide towards Waidmannslust	S85	Adlershof towards Grünau
Schöneweide towards Spandau	S9	Adlershof towards BER Airport
Location

Berlin-Johannisthal (formerly Berlin-Betriebsbahnhof Schöneweide) is a railway station in the Treptow-Köpenick district of Berlin. It is served by the S-Bahn line S45, S46, S8, S85 and S9.

== History ==
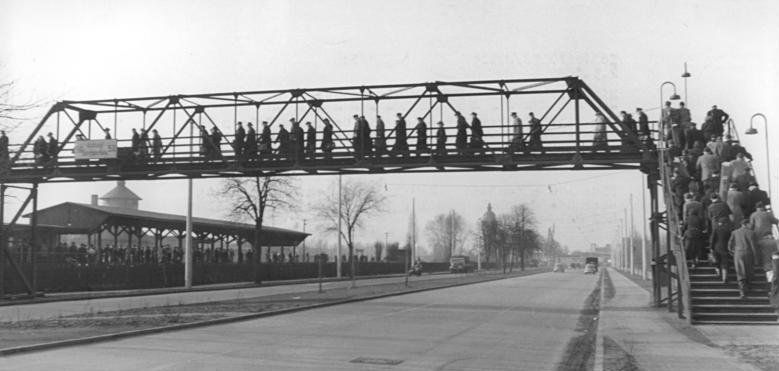
Platform and pedestrian bridge over the Adlergestell in March 1957.

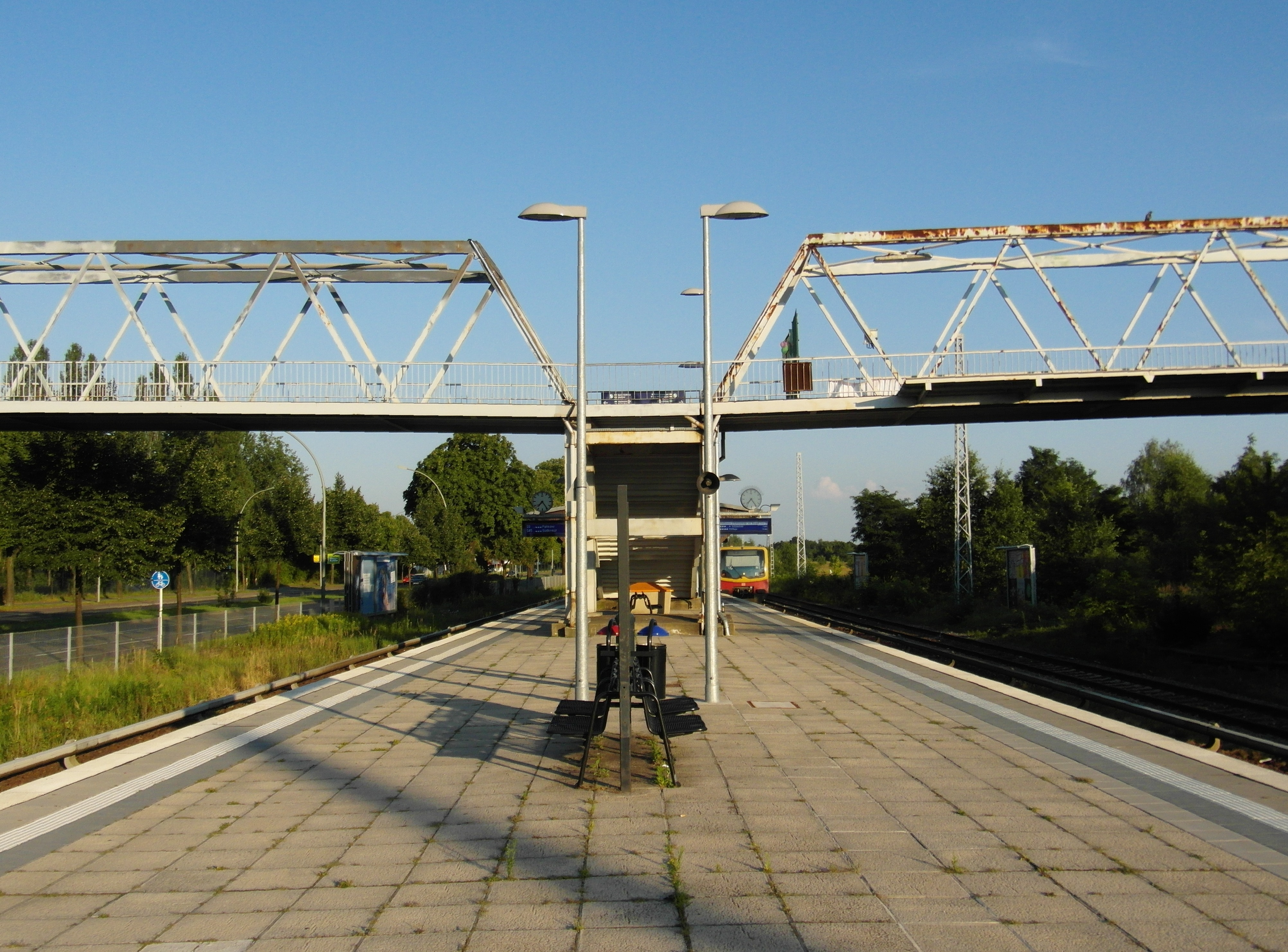
Pedestrian bridge in 2012.

In the course of the development work of the so-called track lens (German: Gleislinse) next to the station, the station was renamed Johannisthal in 2020.
