= Schönfließ station =

Railway station in Brandenburg, Germany

Coordinates: 52.6647°N 13.3403°E

Schönfließ
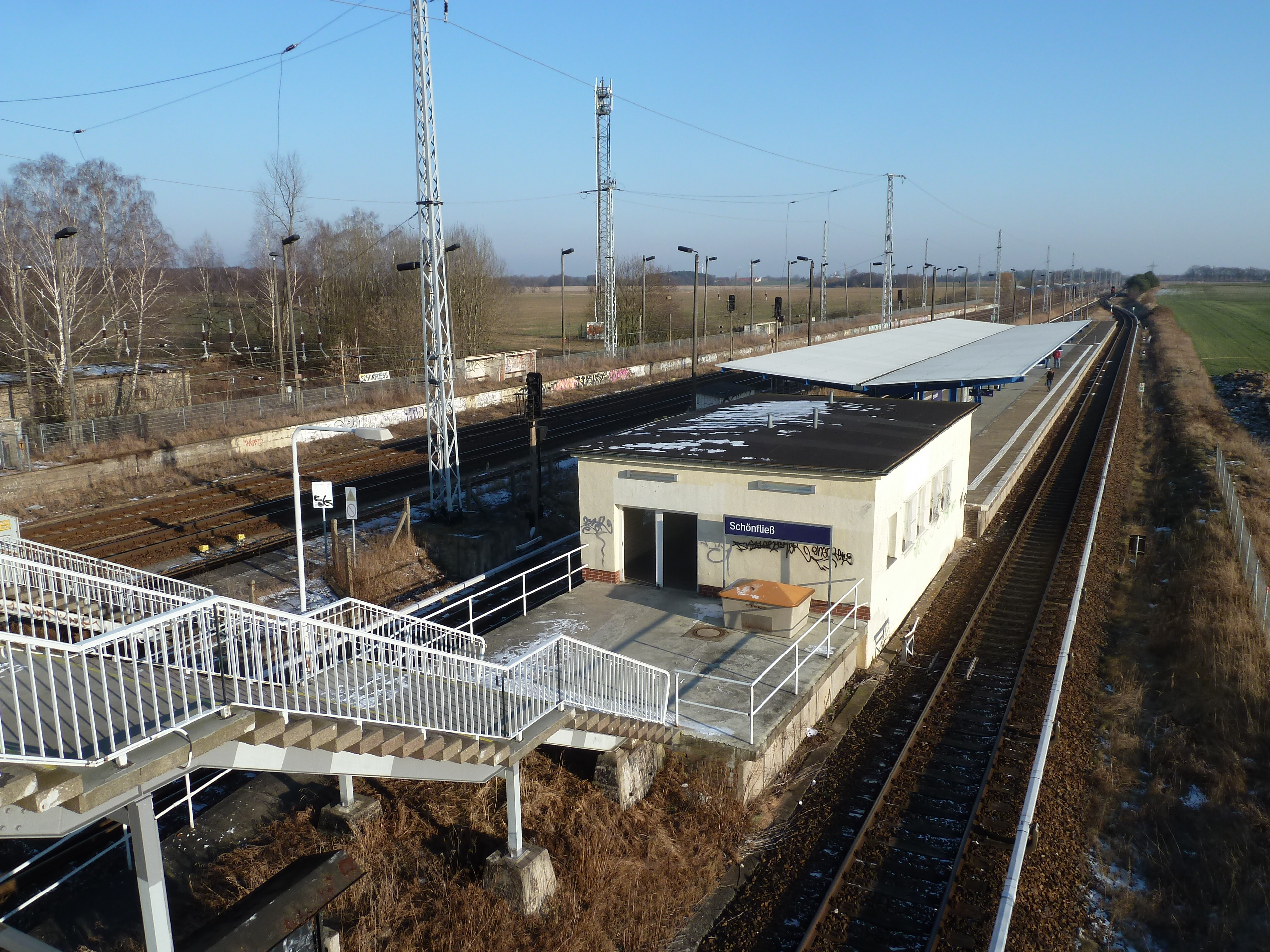

General information
- Location: Summter Weg; 16567 Mühlenbecker Land; Brandenburg; Germany
- Owner: DB Netz
- Operator: DB Station&Service
- Line: Berlin outer ring
- Platforms: 1 island platform
- Tracks: 2
- Train operators: S-Bahn Berlin
- Connections: S8

Construction
- Accessible: no

Other information
- Station code: 5659
- DS100 code: BSFL
- IBNR: 8081290
- Category: 6
- Fare zone: : Berlin C/5255
- Website: www.bahnhof.de

History
- Opened: 4 October 1953; 72 years ago

Services
Preceding station	Berlin S-Bahn	Following station
Bergfelde towards Birkenwerder	S8	Mühlenbeck-Mönchmühle towards Wildau
Location

Schönfließ is a railway station in the Oberhavel district of Brandenburg. It is served by the S-Bahn line S8. It lies on the Berlin outer ring and was formerly served by regional trains.
