= Eichwalde station =

Railway station in Eichwalde, Germany

Eichwalde
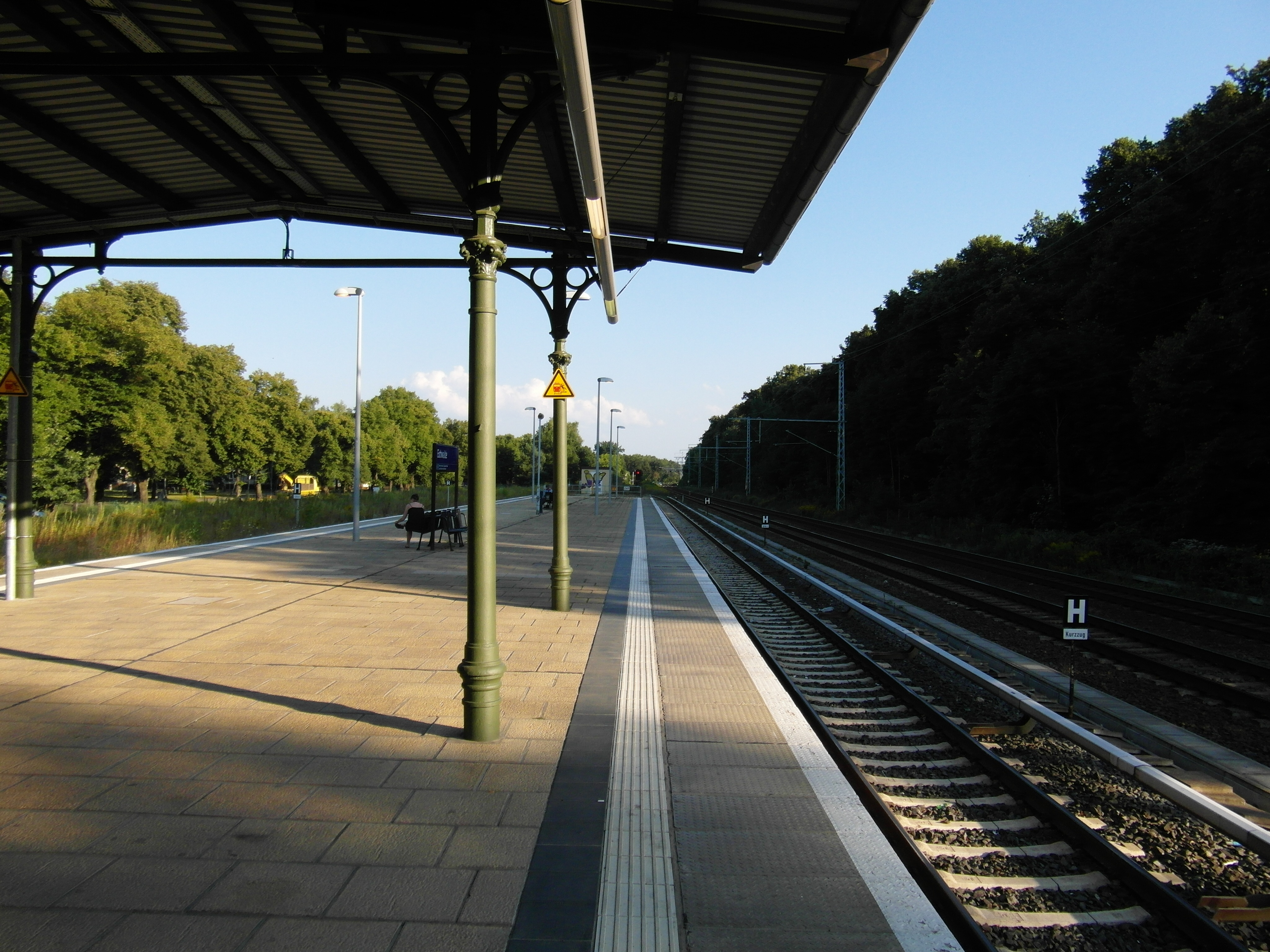

General information
- Location: Eichwalde, Brandenburg; Germany
- Coordinates: 52°22′17″N 13°36′55″E
- Lines: Berlin–Görlitz (KBS 200.45–9)
- Platforms: 2
- Connections: S46 S8

Construction
- Accessible: no

Other information
- Station code: 1507
- DS100 code: BEIW
- Category: 5
- Fare zone: : Berlin C/5859
- Website: www.bahnhof.de

Services
Preceding station	Berlin S-Bahn	Following station
Grünau towards Westend	S46	Zeuthen towards Königs Wusterhausen
Grünau towards Birkenwerder	S8	Zeuthen towards Wildau
Location

Eichwalde is a railway station for the town of Eichwalde in Brandenburg. It is served by the S-Bahn lines S46 and S8.
