= Bergfelde station =

Railway station in Germany

Coordinates: 52.6702°N 13.3203°E

Bergfelde (b Berlin)
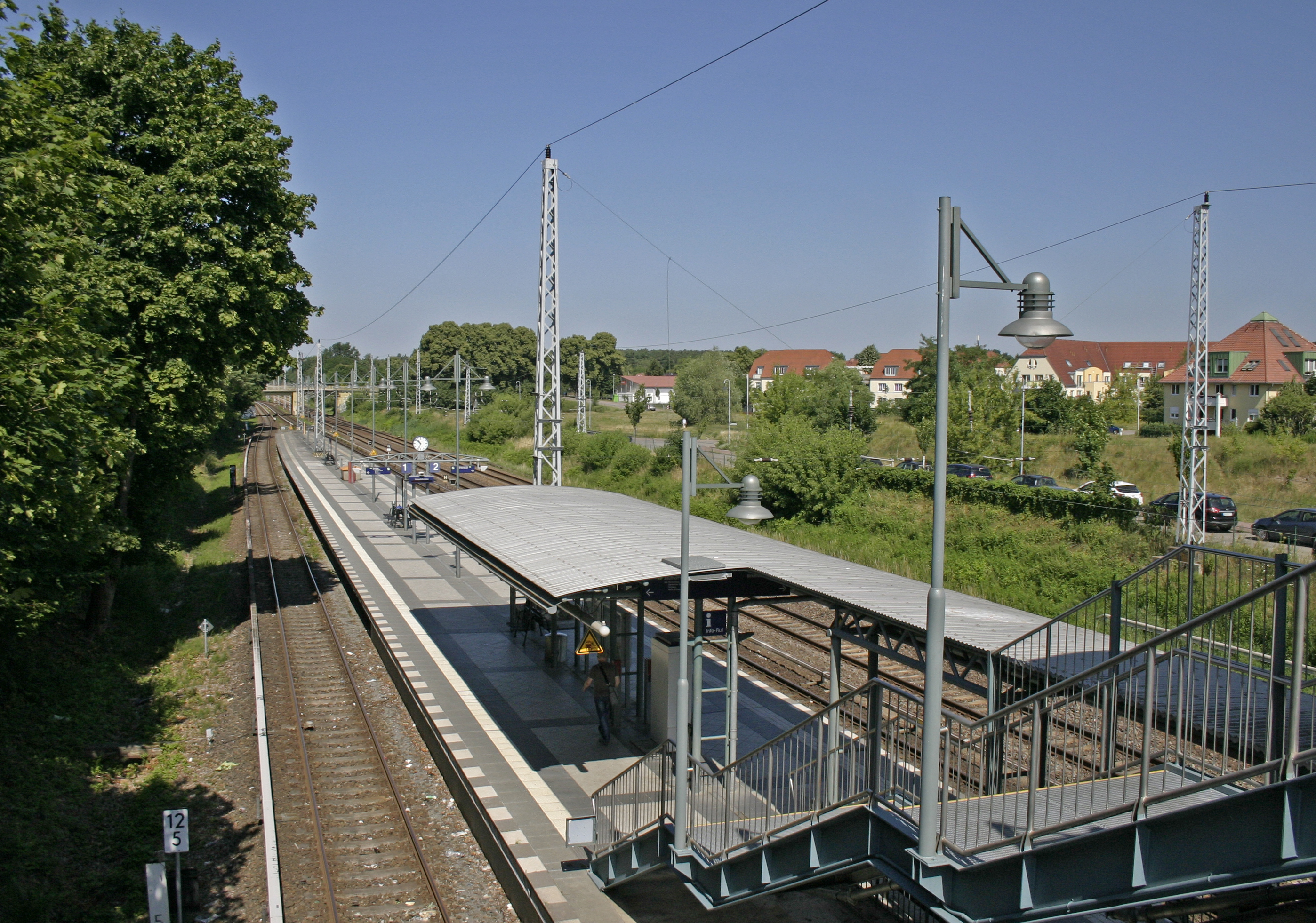

General information
- Owner: DB Netz
- Operator: DB Station&Service
- Line: Berlin outer ring
- Platforms: 1 island platform
- Tracks: 2
- Train operators: S-Bahn Berlin
- Connections: 809

Other information
- Fare zone: : Berlin C/5154
- Website: www.bahnhof.de

History
- Opened: 27 May 1962; 64 years ago

Services
Preceding station	Berlin S-Bahn	Following station
Hohen Neuendorf towards Birkenwerder	S8	Schönfließ towards Wildau
Location

Bergfelde is a railway station in the Oberhavel district of Brandenburg on the Berlin outer ring. It is served by the S-Bahn line S8. The station was built along the line as part of a connection to Hohen Neuendorf from the rest of East Berlin after the previous one (now used by the S1) was cut off by the Berlin Wall.
