= Adlershof station =

Railway station in Adlershof, Berlin, Germany

Berlin Adlershof
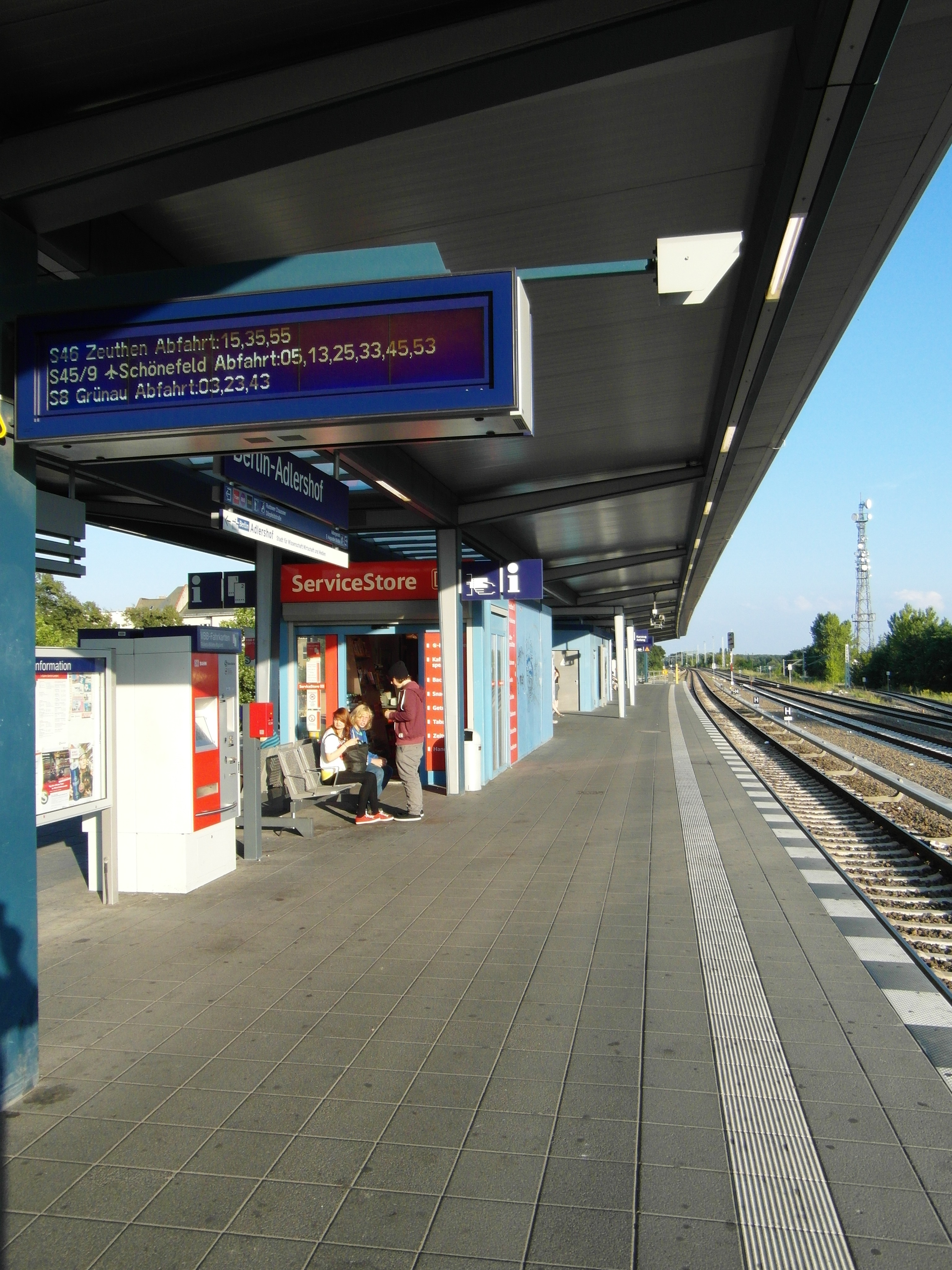

General information
- Other names: Berlin-Adlershof
- Location: Adlershof, Treptow-Köpenick, Berlin; Germany
- Coordinates: 52°26′05″N 13°32′29″E
- Lines: Berlin–Görlitz (KBS 200.45–9)
- Platforms: 1 island platform
- Tracks: 4
- Connections: : 61, 63; : 162, 163, 164, 260, N60, N64, N68

Construction
- Structure type: Elevated
- Cycle facilities: None
- Accessible: Yes

Other information
- Station code: 534
- DS100 code: BADL
- Category: 4
- Fare zone: : Berlin B/5656
- Website: www.bahnhof.de

History
- Opened: 1872; 154 years ago
- Closed: 29 September 1957; 68 years ago (main line service)
- Rebuilt: 7 October 1969; 56 years ago
- Electrified: 6 November 1928; 97 years ago, 750 V DC system (3rd rail) main line (no stopping) 2 June 1984; 42 years ago, 15 kV AC system (overhead)
- Former names: 1872-1894 Bude 10 Adlershof; 1894-1901 Adlershof-Glienicke; 1901-1935 Adlershof-Alt-Glienicke; 1935 to date Berlin-Adlershof

Key dates
- 1894 January 8: station building inaugurated (demolished in 1964)
- 1945, April 25 - June 24: operation interrupted

Services
Preceding station	Berlin S-Bahn	Following station
Berlin-Johannisthal towards Südkreuz	S45	Altglienicke towards BER Airport
Berlin-Johannisthal towards Westend	S46	Grünau towards Königs Wusterhausen
Berlin-Johannisthal towards Birkenwerder	S8	Grünau towards Wildau
Berlin-Johannisthal towards Waidmannslust	S85	Grünau Terminus
Berlin-Johannisthal towards Spandau	S9	Altglienicke towards BER Airport
Location

Adlershof is a railway station in the district of Adlershof in Berlin. It is located on the Berlin–Görlitz railway and is served by lines S45, S46, S8, S85, and S9 of the Berlin S-Bahn.

== History ==
Before a station was actually built, there were two stops on the Görlitzer Bahn. The current station is approximately at the height of the former Bude 10 Adlershof request stop on Dorfstraße (now Dörpfeldstraße), mentioned in plans as early as 1876, while the southern stop Glienicke was at the height of Glienicker Weg. The stop on open tracks was already in use since 1872, but the passenger volume grew so fast that two side platforms were built as early as 1874. On 8 January 1894 a reception building at the new Adlershof-Glienicke station was opened and the Glienicke stop was abandoned. Since October 1901 the station was called Adlershof-Altglienicke, later Adlershof-Alt Glienicke.

With the establishment of the Teltow Canal from 1900 to 1906, there were extensive renovations and an increase in the settled industry. Reconstruction work began in 1905 to raise the Görlitzer Bahn onto an embankment. By 1907, two island platforms were built, one for suburban trains (now the S-Bahn, which uses its own tracks), and another for long-distance trains. At the same time, construction began on the marshalling yard north of Adlershof at the present Schöneweide depot (Betriebsbahnhof), whose tracks led to Adlershof on the Görlitzer Bahn, and extensive track systems on the premises of Adlershof.

In 1909, the Adlershof-Altglienicke tram was opened. In 1912, the Adlershof-Cöpenick tram was opened, followed by Cöpenick's municipal tram system. It was not until Berlin's tram system was established in 1920/1921 that both routes connected to form a common line.

The suburban railway was electrified in 1928, and electric service from Adlershof started on 6 November of that year. The name addition "Alt Glienicke" was dropped on 1 January 1935; since then, the station has been called Berlin-Adlershof.

On 29 September 1957 the mainline platform was abandoned and then demolished. The old Wilhelminian-style reception building, which was about the height of the southern pedestrian tunnel, was demolished in 1964. The conversion work, in the course of which new bridge superstructures over Rudower Chaussee were built in 1960, resulted in a new layout of the entrances. The new lobby was built in the tile style of the 1960s at the intersection of Dörpfeldstraße and Rudower Chaussee. On 7 October 1969, the building, designed by the architects Horst Schubert and Manfred Gross, was opened. The station area remained unchanged for more than 30 years.

With the establishment of the Wissenschafts- und Wirtschaftsstandort Adlershof (WISTA) in 1992, the desire arose for a powerful modern station. The first plans were made in 1996, and on 5 September 2002 the conception of the new station was completed. However, the conversion, planned for the end of 2003 to 2006, was repeatedly postponed.

Until 1962, trams ran on Adlergestell east of the embankment of the Görlitzer Bahn; since then they have run on Rudower Chaussee under the railway bridges and then stopped at the southern exit west of the embankment. Since the line to Altglienicke was closed in 1993, there has been a turning loop there. During the rebuilding of the station, the tram stop was temporarily relocated to a triangular turn on Adlergestell east of the embankment. The extension of the trams on the median strip of Rudower Chaussee to the west to Karl-Ziegler-Straße was opened on 4 September 2011, but the turning loop at the station was retained for operational purposes. Since then, the bus lines from the direction of Rudower Chaussee have been led onto the tram line shortly before the station to relieve the traffic lane.

The new platform area was opened on 15 July 2009. The southern access tunnel was extended to Adlergestell and the new exit opened on 11 November 2010. The construction work on the underpass should originally have been completed by the end of 2010, but was delayed until 30 November 2011. On that day, Rudower Chaussee was reopened for general through traffic.

From 2006 to 2011 there was a comprehensive renovation. The existing bridges, lobbies, stairways and platforms were completely replaced by new buildings.
