= Mühlenbeck-Mönchmühle station =

Railway station in Germany

Coordinates: 52.6546°N 13.3867°E

Mühlenbeck-Mönchmühle
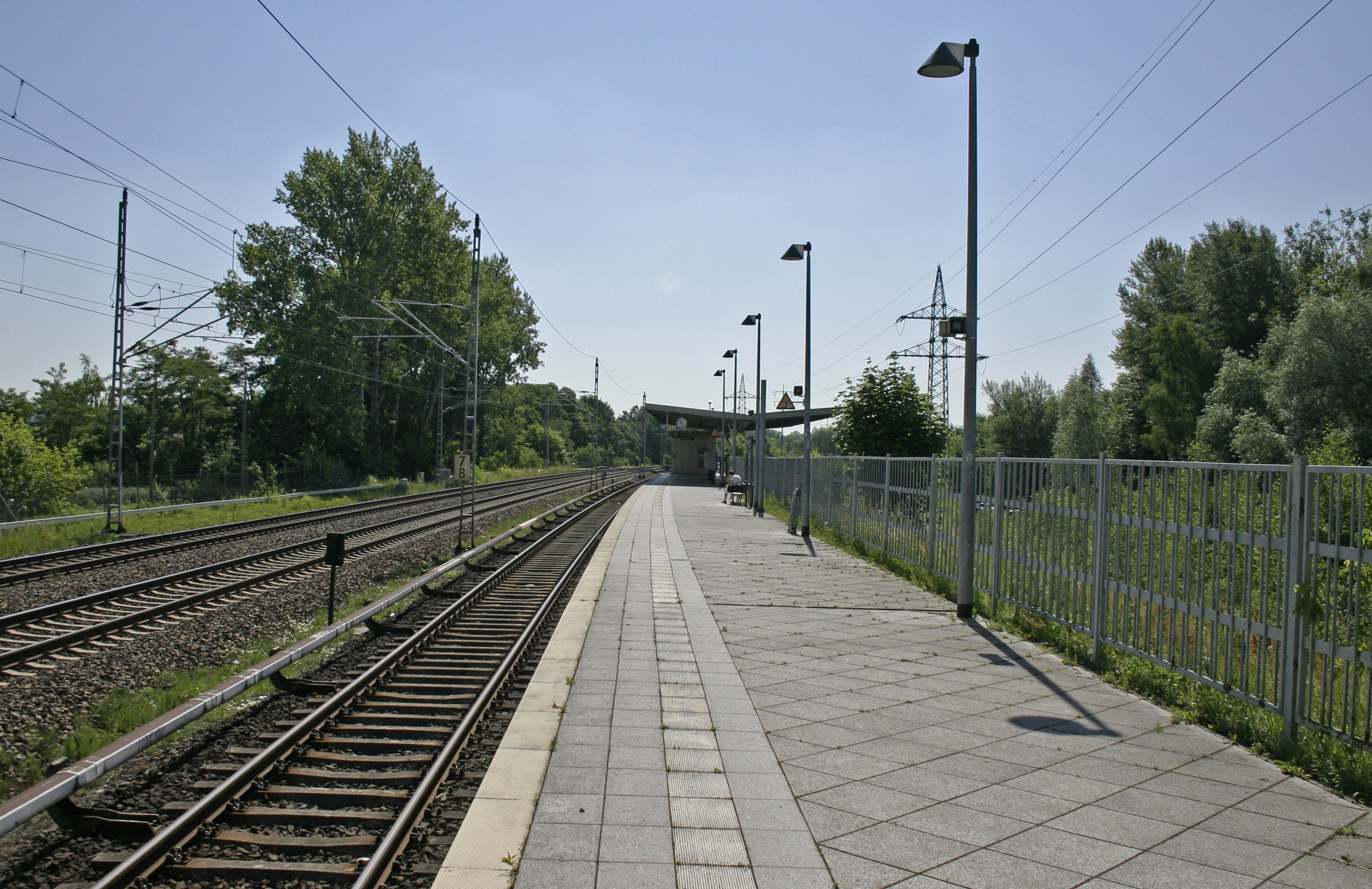
- 2015

General information
- Owner: DB Netz
- Operator: DB Station&Service
- Line: Berlin outer ring
- Platforms: 1 side platform
- Tracks: 1
- Train operators: S-Bahn Berlin
- Connections: 806 810

Other information
- Fare zone: : Berlin C/5255
- Website: www.bahnhof.de

History
- Opened: 2 September 1984; 41 years ago

Services
Preceding station	Berlin S-Bahn	Following station
Schönfließ towards Birkenwerder	S8	Blankenburg towards Wildau
Location

Mühlenbeck-Mönchmühle is a railway station in the Oberhavel district of Brandenburg. It is served by the S-Bahn line S8. The station was opened on 2 September 1984. The station is one of the few, which is just single-track. It does not cause problems, because only every 10 minutes a train stops (from each side every 20 minutes).
