= Altglienicke =

- Quarter of Berlin
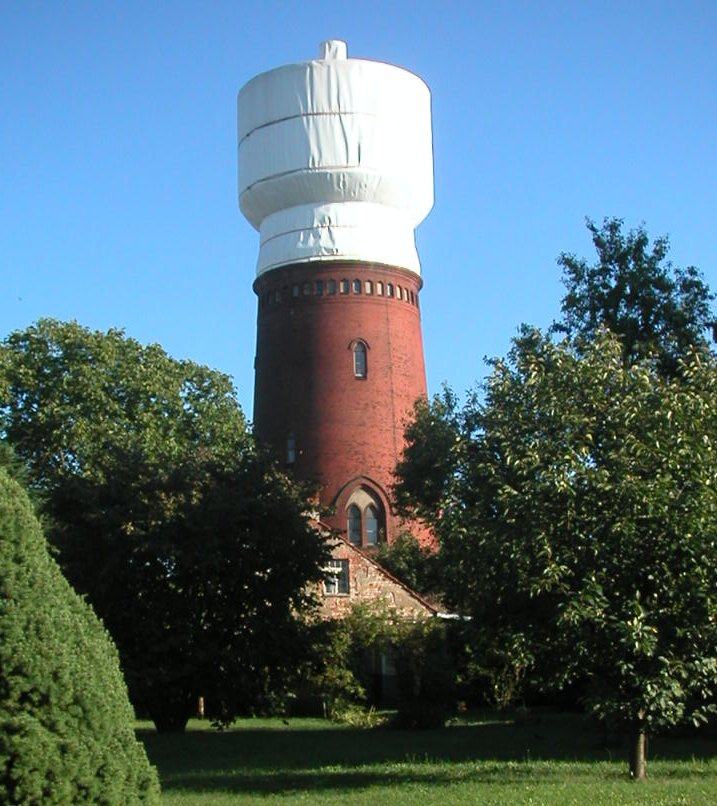
- Water tower

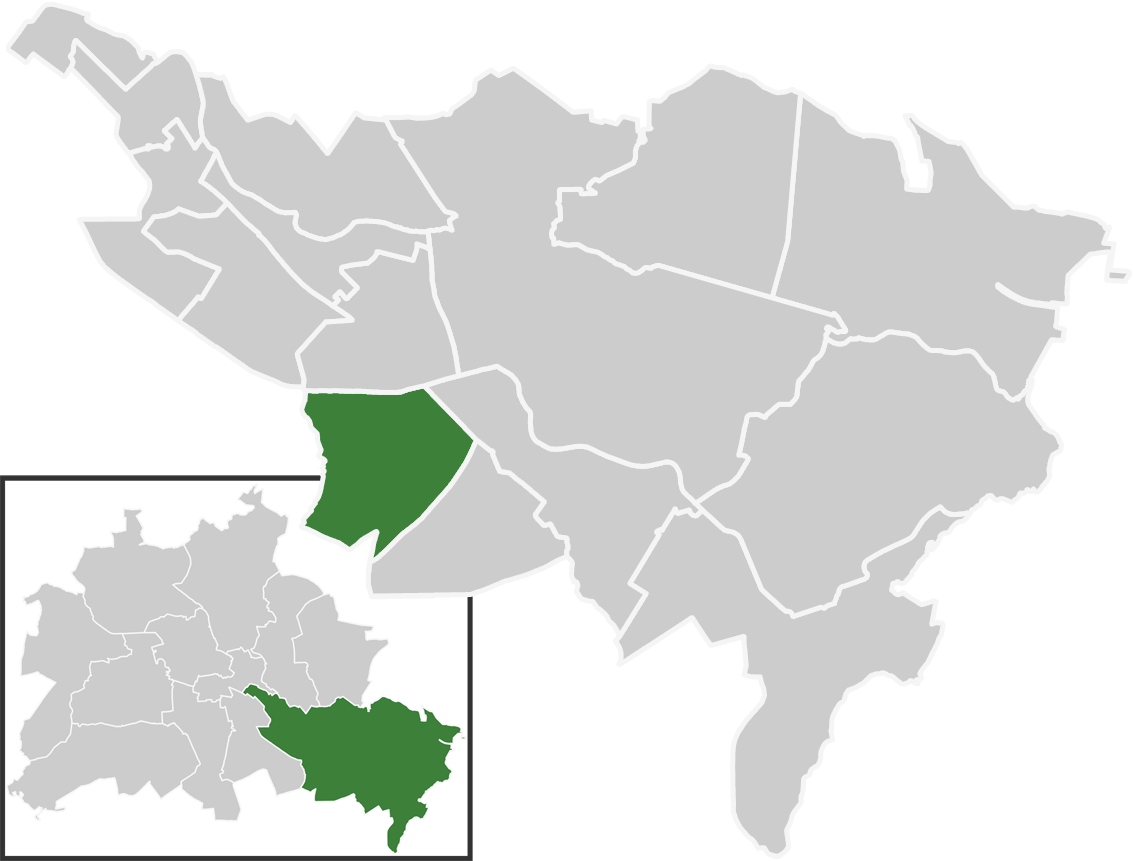
- Location of Altglienicke in Treptow-Köpenick and Berlin
- Interactive map of Altglienicke
- Location within Germany Location within Berlin
- Coordinates: 52°25′00″N 13°32′00″E
- Country: Germany
- State: Berlin
- City: Berlin
- Borough: Treptow-Köpenick
- Founded: 1375
- Subdivisions: 1 zone

Area
  - Total: 7.89 km^{2} (3.05 sq mi)
- Elevation: 34 m (112 ft)

Population (2024-12-31)
  - Total: 33,159
  - Density: 4,200/km^{2} (10,900/sq mi)
- Time zone: UTC+01:00 (CET)
  - Summer (DST): UTC+02:00 (CEST)
- Postal codes: 12524
- Vehicle registration: B
- Website: Official website

Altglienicke (German pronunciation: [altˈɡliːnɪkə], literally Old Glienicke) is a locality (Ortsteil) of Berlin in the borough (Bezirk) of Treptow-Köpenick. Until 2001 it was part of the former borough of Treptow.

== History ==
The village of Glinik was first mentioned in 1375. The Berlin Wall cut through Altglienicke (in East Berlin) and Rudow (in West Berlin) from 1961 until 1990. It was also the location for a joint American and British intelligence operation, Operation Gold.

== Geography ==
=== Position ===
The locality is situated in the south-western side of Treptow-Köpenick. It borders with Rudow (in Neukölln), Johannisthal, Adlershof, Grünau, Bohnsdorf and the municipality of Schönefeld, in the Dahme-Spreewald district of Brandenburg.

=== Subdivision ===
Altglienicke counts 1 zone (Ortslage):

- Falkenberg

== Transportation ==
Altglienicke is served by the Berliner S-Bahn lines S45 and S9, with the stations of Altglienicke and Grünbergallee. Close to the locality is the BER Airport – Terminal 5 station, by the former "Berlin Schönefeld" international airport, which is now part of the Berlin Brandenburg Airport.

== See also ==
- Altglienicke station
