= Johannisthal (Berlin) =

- Quarter of Berlin
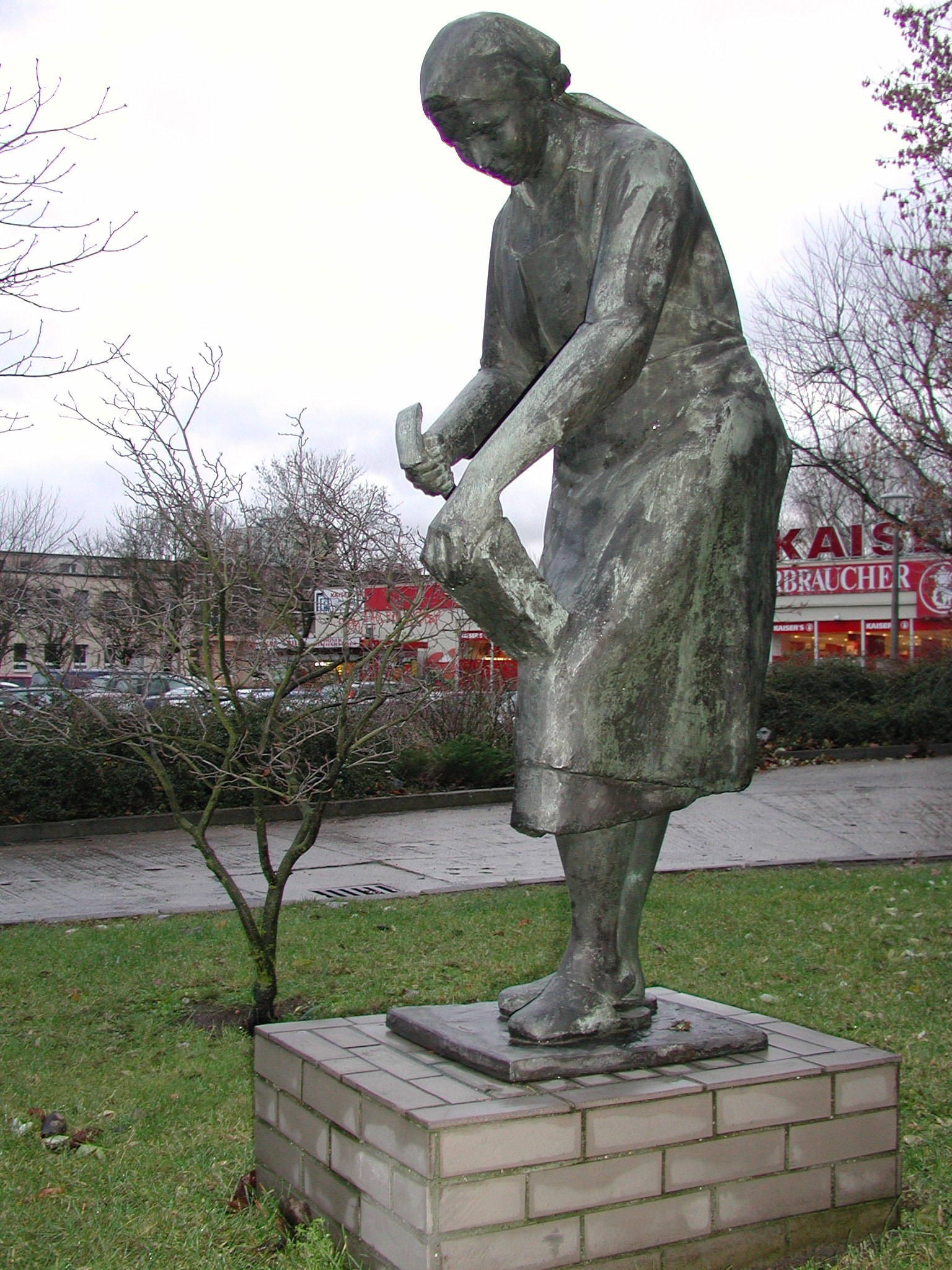
- Trümmerfrau memorial

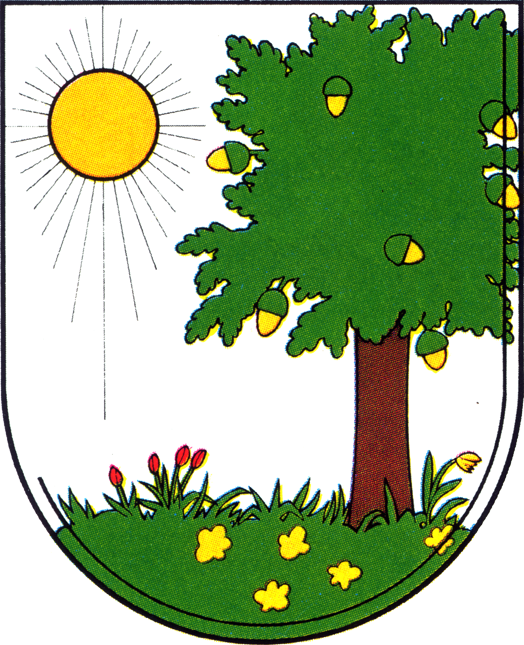
- Coat of arms

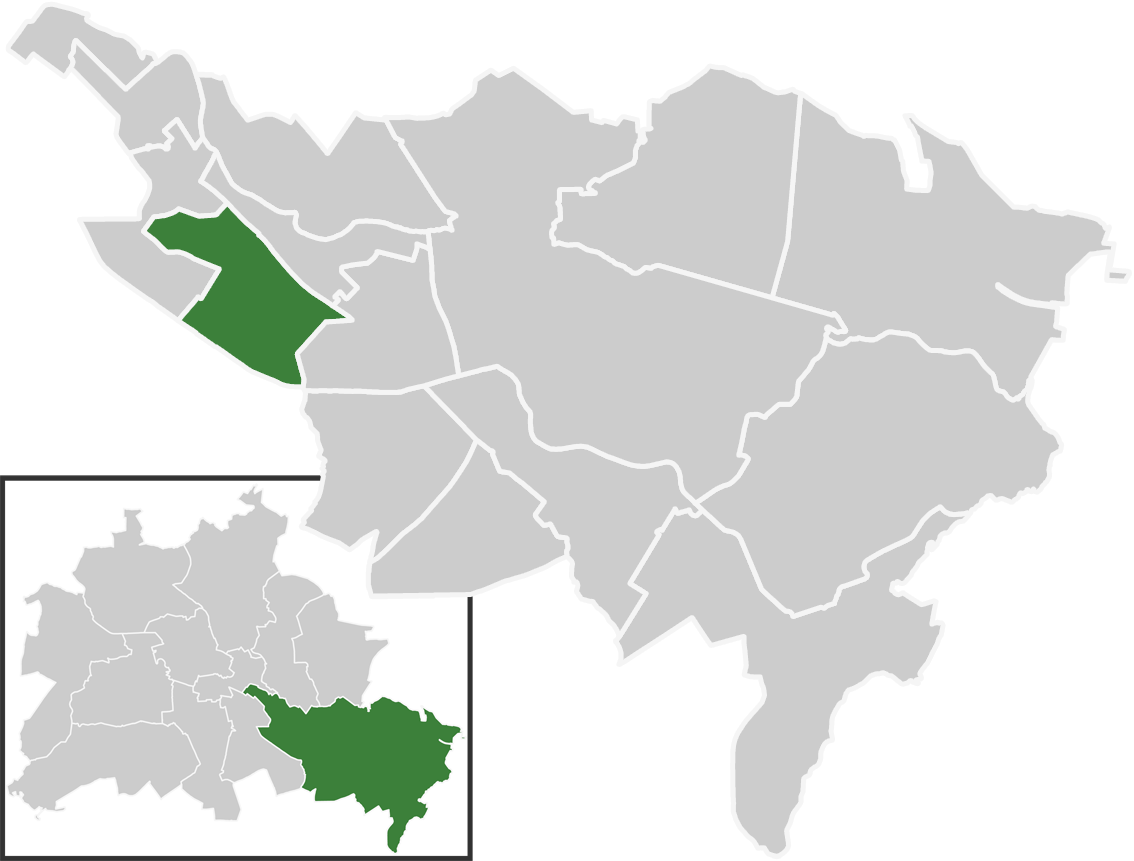
- Location of Johannisthal in Treptow-Köpenick and Berlin
- Interactive map of Johannisthal
- Location within Germany Location within Berlin
- Coordinates: 52°26′36″N 13°30′08″E
- Country: Germany
- State: Berlin
- City: Berlin
- Borough: Treptow-Köpenick
- Founded: 1753
- Subdivisions: 7 zones

Area
  - Total: 6.54 km^{2} (2.53 sq mi)
- Elevation: 34 m (112 ft)

Population (2024-12-31)
  - Total: 21,636
  - Density: 3,310/km^{2} (8,570/sq mi)
- Time zone: UTC+01:00 (CET)
  - Summer (DST): UTC+02:00 (CEST)
- Postal codes: 12487
- Vehicle registration: B

Johannisthal (German pronunciation: [joˈhanɪsˌtaːl]) is a German locality (Ortsteil) within the Berlin borough (Bezirk) of Treptow-Köpenick. Until 2001 it was part of the former borough of Treptow.

== History ==
The first mention of the locality dates from November 16, 1753. In 1880 it was served by a train station on the Berlin-Görlitzer Eisenbahn and in 1884 it was awarded by the title of Bad (bath), becoming Bad Johannisthal. From 1905 to 1906 the town hall was built, and in 1920 the "Greater Berlin Act" merged the town into Berlin. As part of East Berlin bordering Neukölln (West Berlin), its limits were crossed by the Berlin Wall from 1961 to 1989.

== Geography ==
=== Overview ===
Located in the south-eastern side of the city, not too far from the river Spree, Johannisthal borders the localities of Baumschulenweg, Niederschöneweide, Adlershof, Altglienicke and Rudow (this one in Neukölln district). Its urban park is the Königsheide.

=== Subdivision ===
Johannisthal is subdivided into 7 zones (Ortslagen):

- Alt-Johannisthal (Winckelmannstraße)
- Eisenbahnsiedlung (Friedrich-List-Straße, Hagedornstraße)
- Flugplatz-Siedlung (close to Johannisthal Air Field)
- Johannisthal-Süd (Springbornstraße)
- Kleinhaussiedlung (Am Alten Fenn)
- Komponisten-Viertel (Fielitzstraße)
- Schliemann-Siedlung (Eisenhutweg)

== Transport ==
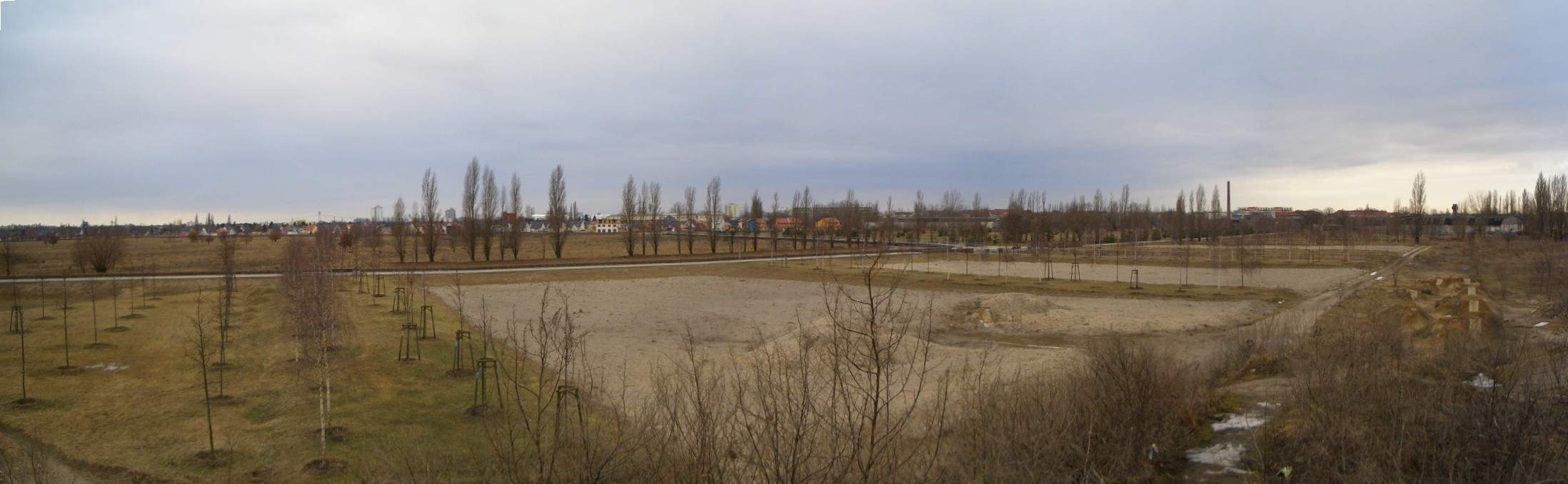
Johannisthal Air Field in 2006

Germany's first airport, located between Johannisthal and Adlershof, the "Johannisthal Air Field", was opened on September 26, 1909 and officially closed in 1995.

The locality is served by the S-Bahn lines S45, S46, S47, S8, S85 and S9 at the stations of Schöneweide and Johannisthal, located at its eastern borders. It is also served by the tramway lines M17, 21, 27, 60, 67 and mainly the 63, that ends in the middle of the quarter. Johannisthal is crossed at its southern limits by the motorway A113. It is served by the exits n.4 ("Stubenrauchstraße") and n.5 ("Adlershof").

== Notable people ==
- Angelika Barbe (b. 1951)
- Amelie Beese (1886–1925)
- Luigi Colani (b. 1928)
- Heinrich Deiters (1887–1966)
- Ludwig Deiters (b. 1921)
- Friedrich Ebert Jr. (1894–1979), politician (SPD, SED)
- Horst Gibtner (1940–2006)
- Bernhard Grzimek (1909–1987)
- Gregor Gysi (b. 1948), politician (SED, PDS, Die Linke)
- Klaus Gysi (1912–1999)
- Helene Kirsch (1906-1999), politician (KPD)
- Fritz Klein (born 1924)
- Karin Ugowski (born 1943), German film and stage actress, voice actress, narrator and film producer
- Claudia Uhle (born 1976)
- Dieter Zechlin (born 1926)
