= Zeuthen station =

Railway station near Berlin, Germany

Zeuthen
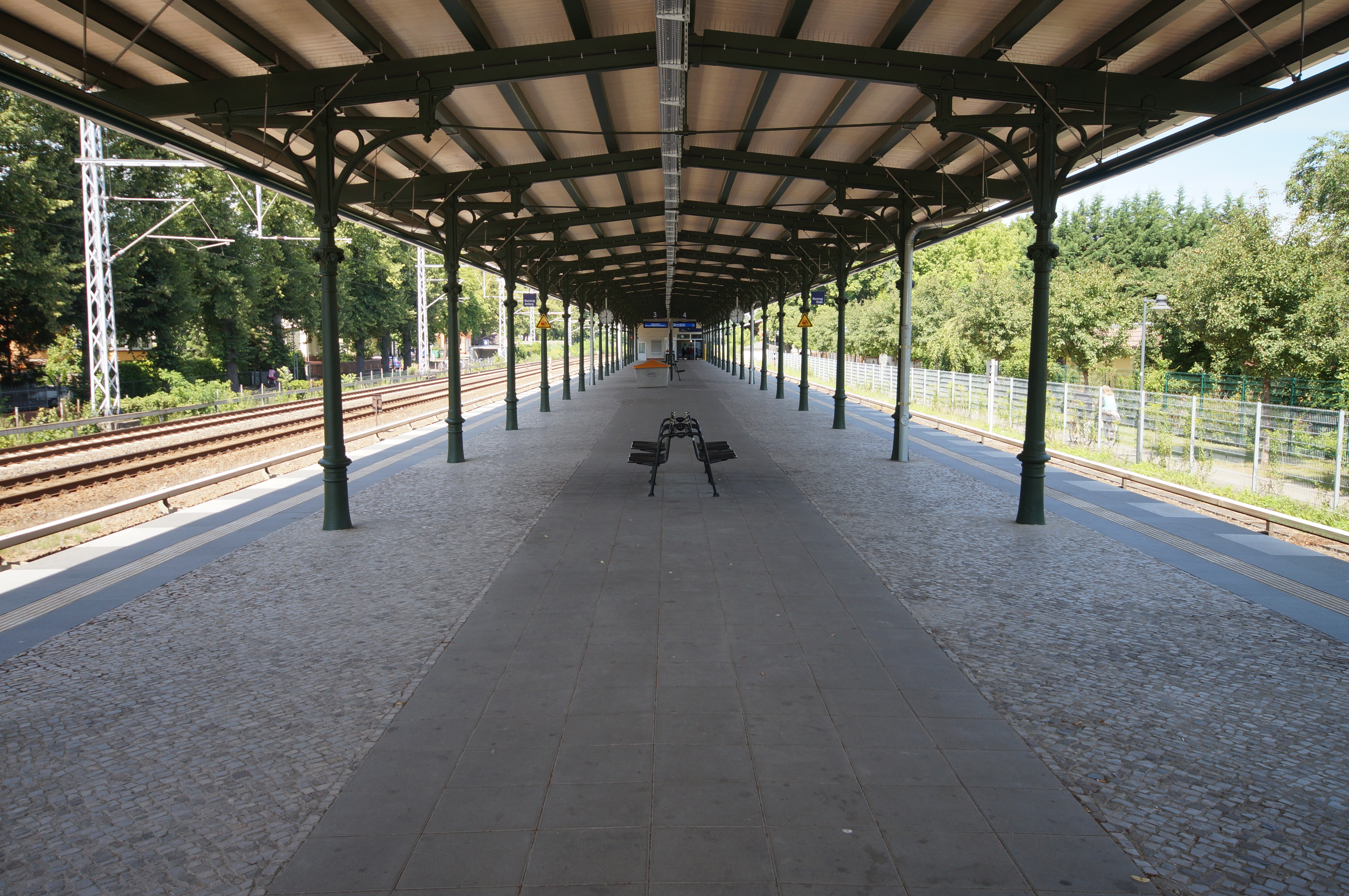

General information
- Location: Zeuthen, Brandenburg; Germany
- Coordinates: 52°20′55″N 13°37′39″E
- Lines: Berlin–Görlitz (KBS 200.45–9)
- Platforms: 2
- Tracks: 2
- Connections: S46 S8

Other information
- Station code: 7010
- DS100 code: BZN
- Category: 5
- Fare zone: : Berlin C/5959
- Website: www.bahnhof.de

Services
Preceding station	Berlin S-Bahn	Following station
Eichwalde towards Westend	S46	Wildau towards Königs Wusterhausen
Eichwalde towards Birkenwerder	S8	Wildau Terminus
Location

Zeuthen station is a railway station for the town of Zeuthen in Brandenburg. It is served by the S-Bahn lines S46 and S8.

Until 13 October 2022, Zeuthen was the peak-time terminus for line S8 (off-peak trains terminate at Grünau).

== Location ==
The train station is located in the municipality of Zeuthen in the district of Dahme-Spreewald. The centre of Zeuthen is about 500 meters, the city centre of Berlin about 25 kilometres to the north-west as the crow flies. It borders on Bahnstrasse and Friesenstrasse. The forest path, the state road 402, runs over the level crossing in the south of the station. Eichwalde train station is about 2.8 kilometres further north, Wildau train station about 3.4 kilometres south. The station is located in the Berlin C tariff area of the Berlin-Brandenburg transport association.

== History ==
After the opening on May 24, 1868, the station was initially in Miersdorf at Hankels Ablage and was called Hankels Ablage Bude 21. In the first few years there were only sporadic stops there, and regular stops from June 1, 1874. In 1892 the name was changed from Hankels Ablage Bude 21 to Hankels Ablage Zeuthen. The original platform was south of the forest road.

To better serve the place, the platform was relocated 200 meters north to the northern side of the forest road. The new station, which opened on November 1, 1897, was named Zeuthen.

Due to war damage, the station was closed from April 1945 to June 21, 1945. On April 30, 1951, the first electric S-Bahns ran to the station. Towards the end of the 1960s, the crossing track in the station was put into operation. On February 19, 2001, a new platform access was opened at the southern end of the platform.

In 2018, work began to create barrier-free access to the platform. The pedestrian underpass will be modernized, and three elevators will be installed. In addition, the stairs to the platform will be renewed. The work should be completed in October 2019.

== Investments ==
In 1967 the station had four tracks numbered from three to six. Track 3 was 730 meters long, track 4 520 meters, track 5 480 meters and track 6 180 meters. 18 points were available for traffic. The station has a central platform on the S-Bahn tracks. The main access to the platform is on its north side, it can be reached via a pedestrian tunnel from both sides of the track via stairs. At the exit of the stairs there is a small access structure on the platform.
