= Hohen Neuendorf station =

Railway station in Hohen Neuendorf, Germany

Coordinates: 52.6684°N 13.2870°E

Hohen Neuendorf (b Berlin)
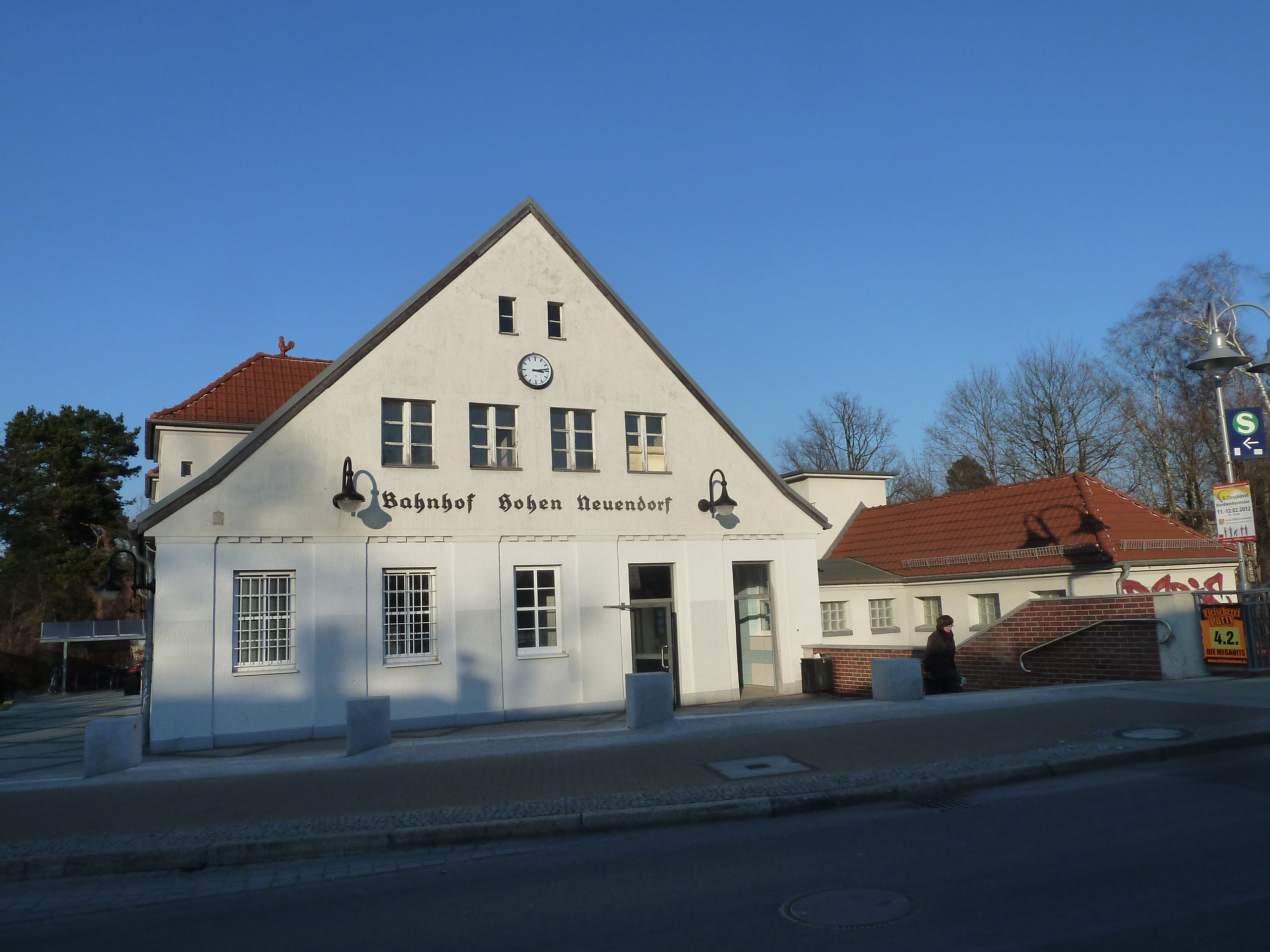
- 2012

General information
- Location: Schönfließer Straße 16; 16540 Hohen Neuendorf; Brandenburg; Germany
- Owner: DB Netz
- Operator: DB Station&Service
- Lines: Berlin Northern Railway (KBS 200.1)
- Platforms: 1 island platform
- Tracks: 2
- Train operators: S-Bahn Berlin
- Connections: 809 822

Other information
- Station code: 2832
- DS100 code: BHN
- IBNR: 8080720
- Category: 5
- Fare zone: VBB: Berlin C/5154
- Website: www.bahnhof.de

History
- Opened: 1 September 1877; 148 years ago
- Electrified: 5 June 1925; 101 years ago

Key dates
- 11 December 1924: current building opened

Services
Preceding station	Berlin S-Bahn	Following station
Birkenwerder towards Oranienburg	S1	Frohnau towards Wannsee
Birkenwerder Terminus	S8	Bergfelde towards Wildau
Location

Hohen Neuendorf (in German S-Bahnhof Hohen Neuendorf) is a railway station in the town of Hohen Neuendorf, Germany. It is served by the Berlin S-Bahn and by several local buses.

On 13 August 1961, the S-Bahn line to Oranienburg was cut off by the Berlin Wall, and it was only from Hohen Neuendorf to Oranienburg as a shuttle and a lonely, not connected line. It was only connected on 19 November 1961 to the rest of the East Berlin S-Bahn. The West Berlin section from Hohen Neuendorf to Frohnau was later reconstructed since February 1991 and reopened on 31 May 1992. In addition, the southern exit from Hohen Neuendorf was also closed.
