= Berlin-Grünau station =

Railway station in Berlin, Germany

Berlin Grünau
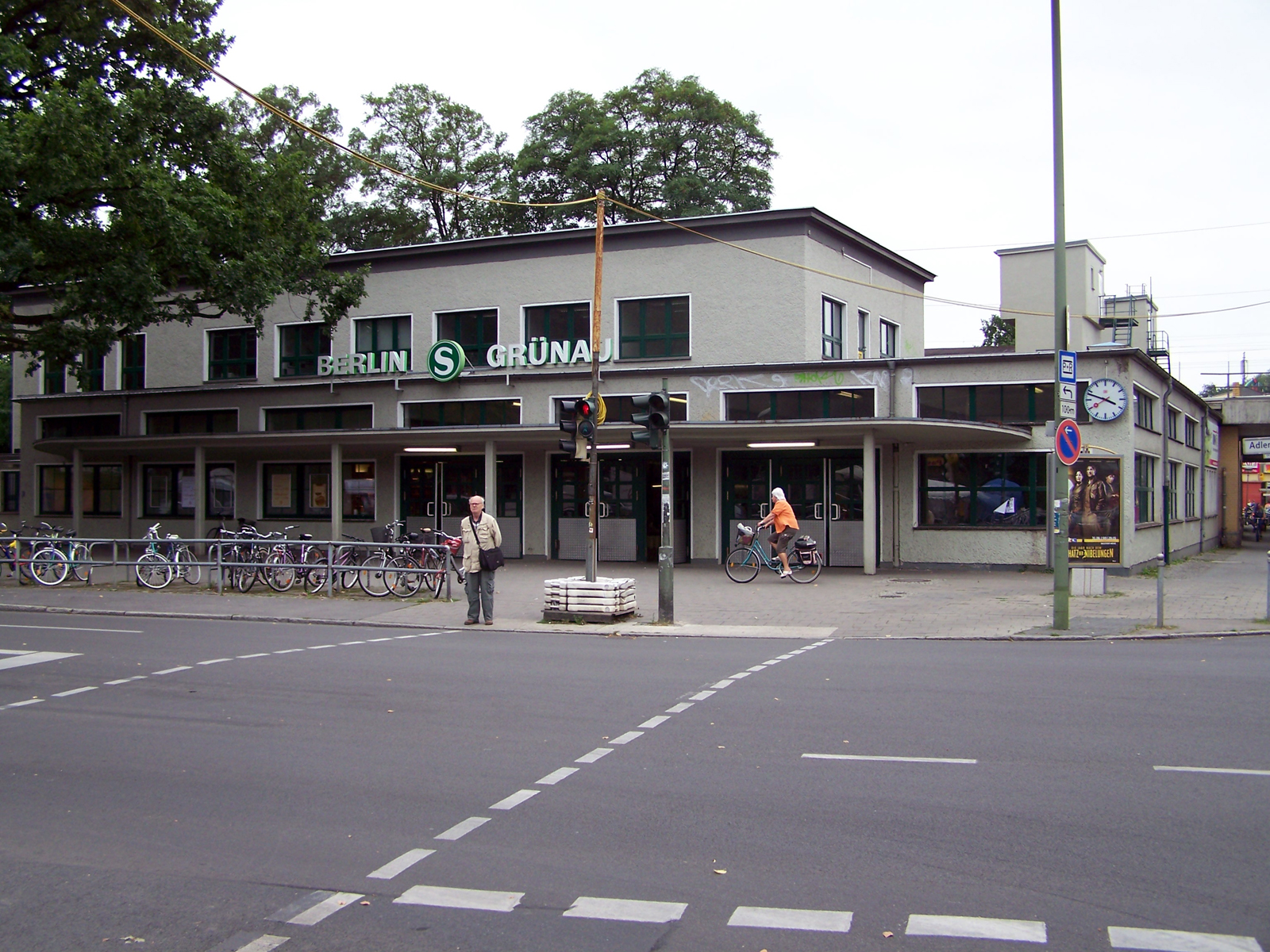

General information
- Location: Treptow-Köpenick, Berlin, Berlin; Germany
- Coordinates: 52°24′44″N 13°34′29″E
- Lines: Berlin–Görlitz (KBS 200.45–9)
- Platforms: 2
- Connections: S46 S8 S85

Other information
- Station code: 540
- DS100 code: BGAS
- Category: 4
- Fare zone: : Berlin B/5656
- Website: www.bahnhof.de

History
- Opened: 13 September 1866

Services
Preceding station	Berlin S-Bahn	Following station
Adlershof towards Westend	S46	Eichwalde towards Königs Wusterhausen
Adlershof towards Birkenwerder	S8	Eichwalde towards Wildau
Adlershof towards Waidmannslust	S85	Terminus
Location

Berlin-Grünau is a railway station in the Treptow-Köpenick district of Berlin. It is served by the S-Bahn line S46, S8 and S85.

Grünau is the terminus for off-peak S8 trains (during peak times S8 trains continue to Wildau) and the peak-time terminus for line S85 (off-peak trains terminate at Schöneweide).

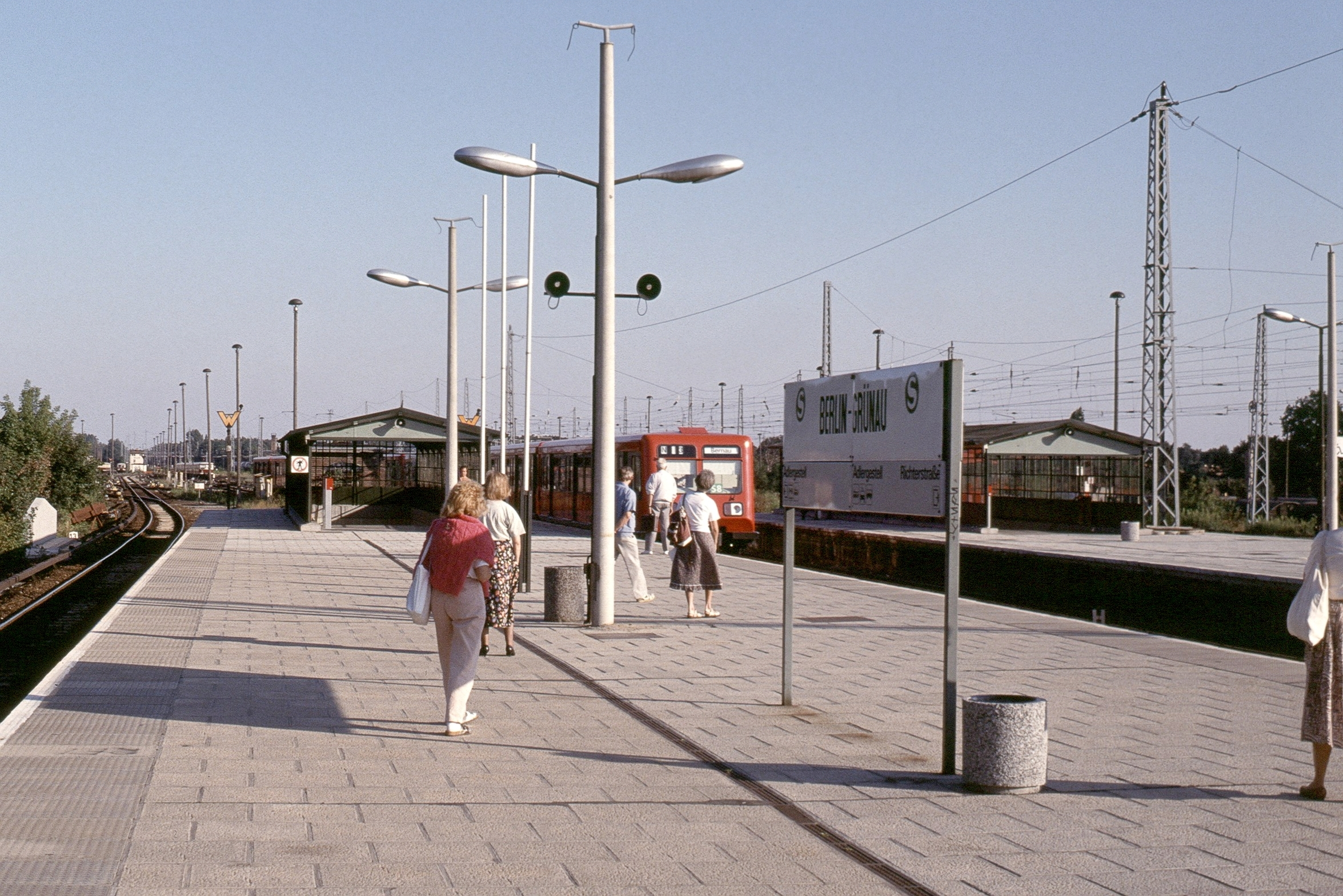
Berlin-Grünau station in 1991.
