= Helene Kirsch =

German politician (1906–1999)

- Born: 18 July 1906; Johannisthal, Berlin, German Empire
- Died: 15 August 1999 (aged 93); Berlin, Germany
- Occupation: politician
- Political party: KPD; SED
- Spouse: Bruno Fredrich (1903–1943)
- Parent(s): Hermann & Emilie Kirsch

Helene Kirsch (18 July 1906 – 15 August 1999) was a German politician (KPD). She was briefly a member of the national parliament ("Reichstag") in 1932/33.

== Life ==
=== Family provenance and early years ===
Helene Kirsch was born in the Johannisthal quarter of Berlin. She was one of between seven and nine recorded children born to Hermann Kirsch, variously described as a building worker, an industrial worker and an agricultural worker. His wife was her mother Emilie, many of whose energies were devoted to the family, although she also earned money delivering newspapers and undertaking cleaning work. Hermann Kirsch was a member of the Social Democratic Party who in 1919 switched to the Communist Party, a development which deeply affected his children.

Along with Helene Kirsch, four of her siblings became Communist Party officers during the 1920s: Franz Kirsch (1901–1944), Fritz Kirsch (1903–1940), Otto Kirsch and Emilie Kirsch.

Helene Kirsch attended junior school locally in Johannisthal and then obtained work as an assembly worker at the Lorenz Telephone Relay Company in Tempelhof. Another of her early jobs was at a cigarette factory.

=== Weimar years (1919–1933) ===
As a young woman Helene Kirsch was noted for her beauty. She was asked about this in 1987, by which time she was 81.

"Oh, beauty passes. What you do with your life for other people, that's what lasts."
"„Ach, Schönheit vergeht. Was man im Leben für den Mitmenschen tut, das bleibt."

When she was 14 Kirsch joined the Young Communists. In 1925, still aged only 19, she joined the Communist Party itself. 1925 was also the year in which she joined a trades union. She also quickly became actively engaged with "Red Aid" (Rote Hilfe), the Communist Party workers' welfare organisation which was widely seen as having close links with the Soviet Communist Party in Moscow. Throughout this period, at least up till 1932, she was living in Berlin.

Kirsch was a member of the party's regional leadership team (Bezirksleitung) for Berlin-Brandenburg, and was a delegate to the party's first and second congresses of working women. In 1931/32 she was employed as a kitchen assistant and server at the Soviet Union's permanent trade mission which was based in Karl Liebknecht House, which was also the national headquarters in Berlin of the German Communist Party. After this she obtained a job as a party instructor within the regional leadership.

With political instability mounting, 1932 was a year with two general elections in Germany. The second of them took place in November. Helene Kirsch was elected to the national parliament ("Reichstag") as a Communist member representing a Berlin electoral district.

=== Nazi years (1933–1945) ===
The political context change abruptly in January 1933 when the Nazi Party took power and converted Germany into a one-party dictatorship. At the end of February the Reichstag fire was instantly blamed on the Communists, and in March 1933 Communist members were expelled from the Reichstag which was in any case rendered irrelevant by enabling legislation that allowed the government to rule without parliamentary consent. From March 1933 work for the Communist Party was illegal. In April 1933 the Berlin party leadership, led at this point by Willy Sägebrecht, sent Helene Kirsch to Cottbus in order to try and sustain the shattered communications between the party teams across the regions, and to support the regional leadership team in Cottbus in doing what was necessary to adapt the party organisation for conditions of illegality.

On 24 July 1933 Kirsch was arrested in Cottbus for illegal political activity. She was taken to the local SA premises and beaten with a stick and kicked in order to extract a confession. (Two of her assailants were identified after the end of the war and received long prison sentences.) Charges were laid on 29 November 1933 and on 10 April 1934 she was one of 25 Communists from Berlin, Cottbus and Forst whom the Berlin High Court sentenced. Kirsch was given a prison term of two years and nine months. She was taken to serve her sentence at the Women's Prison in Jauer. In September 1935, following a series of prisoner strikes, she and 45 other prisoners were charged with mutiny (or incitement to mutiny) but charges were dropped for lack of evidence. Kirsch was released from the prison in Jauer on 12 May 1936, but was required to report to a police station on a daily basis for more than a year after that.

After her release Kirsch took work in a metal goods factory in Wedding, a quarter of Berlin. She was still working there when the war ended in 1945, albeit not without interruption along the way. Also following her release, she married the print worker Bruno Fredrich (1903–1943). He had been a member of the Communist Party before 1933. However, war resumed in 1939 and he was conscripted into the army. After 1943 he was listed as "missing".

Helene Fredrich was still under police surveillance in 1938: in 1939 she was re-arrested and briefly held in "protective custody" ("Schutzhaft"). During the war she stayed in touch with the Communist underground - in effect the Saefkow-Jacob-Bästlein Organization – through her friends Ella Trebe and Marta Wagner. This involved missions to get hold of food and money for resistance fighters living illegally in Berlin.

=== Soviet occupation zone (1945–1949) ===
War ended in May 1945 and Helene Fredrich, as she was now calling herself, lost no time in signing up to the newly relegimitized Communist Party and in June 1945 she was mandated by the party to organise women's work in the party, with the title "District Women's Leader" ("Kreisfrauenleiterin ") in Berlin Wedding. Later her regional responsibilities in this post were switched to cover, jointly with Emmi Plinz, the entire Brandenburg region, which involved relocating a short distance, to Potsdam. However, she resigned from this job on health grounds in March 1947. Her successor was Margarete Langner. Helene Fredrich returned to Berlin.

In April 1946 she was a delegate at the conference which led to the controversial creation of the Socialist Unity Party (Sozialistische Einheitspartei Deutschlands / SED). After the war, with what remained of Germany divided into military occupation zones, the central portion of the country, surrounding Berlin, was administered as the Soviet occupation zone. By the time when, in October 1949, the entire zone was relaunched as the Soviet sponsored German Democratic Republic (East Germany), the creation of the SED would be seen as a necessary pre-condition for a return to one-party dictatorship. Following the establishment of the SED, Fredrich was appointed a member of the Brandenburg regional parliament (Landtag), remaining a member till 1950. Regional parliaments were abolished outright two years later as part of a process to streamline and centralise administration and control: while she was a member of it, it appears to have taken up relatively little of her time.

=== German Democratic Republic (1949–1989) ===
There is relatively little information on the final decades of her life in the available sources. After 1947 she had a job as a spokesperson in the party central secretariat. She was employed by the important Central Committee of the ruling SED (party) till 1972, working in its "West Department" which was concerned with the critical but difficult relationship between East and West Germany.

=== Final years ===
By the time of her death in 1999, Helene Kirsch-Fredrich had comfortably outlived the German Democratic Republic. Relatively little information exists about her private life. Günter Wehner quotes people who knew her who thought her "gregarious and outgoing" ("gesellige und kontaktfreudige"), and also found her "energetic and focused" ("energisch und durchsetzungsfähig").

== Awards and honours ==
- 1966 Patriotic Order of Merit in silver
- 1971 Patriotic Order of Merit in gold
- 1976 Patriotic Order of Merit gold clasp
- 1981 Order of Karl Marx
