= Hohen Neuendorf West station =

Railway station in Hohen Neuendorf, Germany

Hohen Neuendorf West
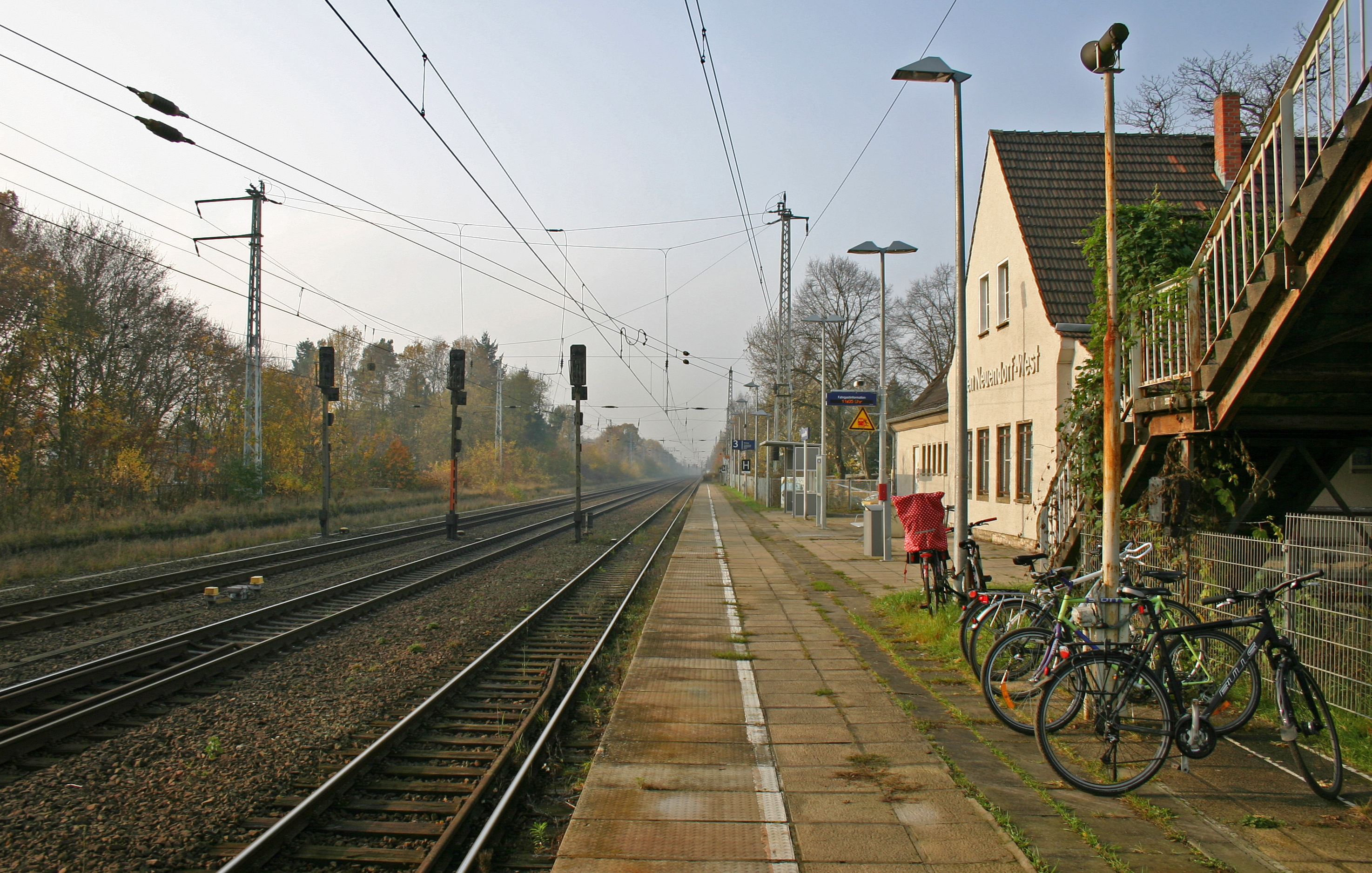
- 2014

General information
- Location: Birkenwerder Straße 1; 16540 Hohen Neuendorf; Brandenburg; Germany
- Coordinates: 52°40′20″N 13°16′14″E
- System: Bf
- Owner: DB Netz
- Operator: DB Station&Service
- Line: Berlin outer ring
- Platforms: 1 side platform
- Tracks: 1
- Train operators: DB Regio Nordost

Other information
- Station code: 2833
- DS100 code: BHOW
- IBNR: 8080710
- Category: 6
- Fare zone: VBB: Berlin C/5154
- Website: www.bahnhof.de

History
- Opened: 10 August 1954; 72 years ago

Services
Preceding station	DB Regio Nordost	Following station
Hennigsdorf towards Potsdam Griebnitzsee	RB 20	Birkenwerder towards Oranienburg
Location
- Location within Brandenburg Location within Germany Location within Europe

Hohen Neuendorf West is a railway station in the western part of the town of Hohen Neuendorf which is located in the Oberhavel district of Brandenburg, Germany.

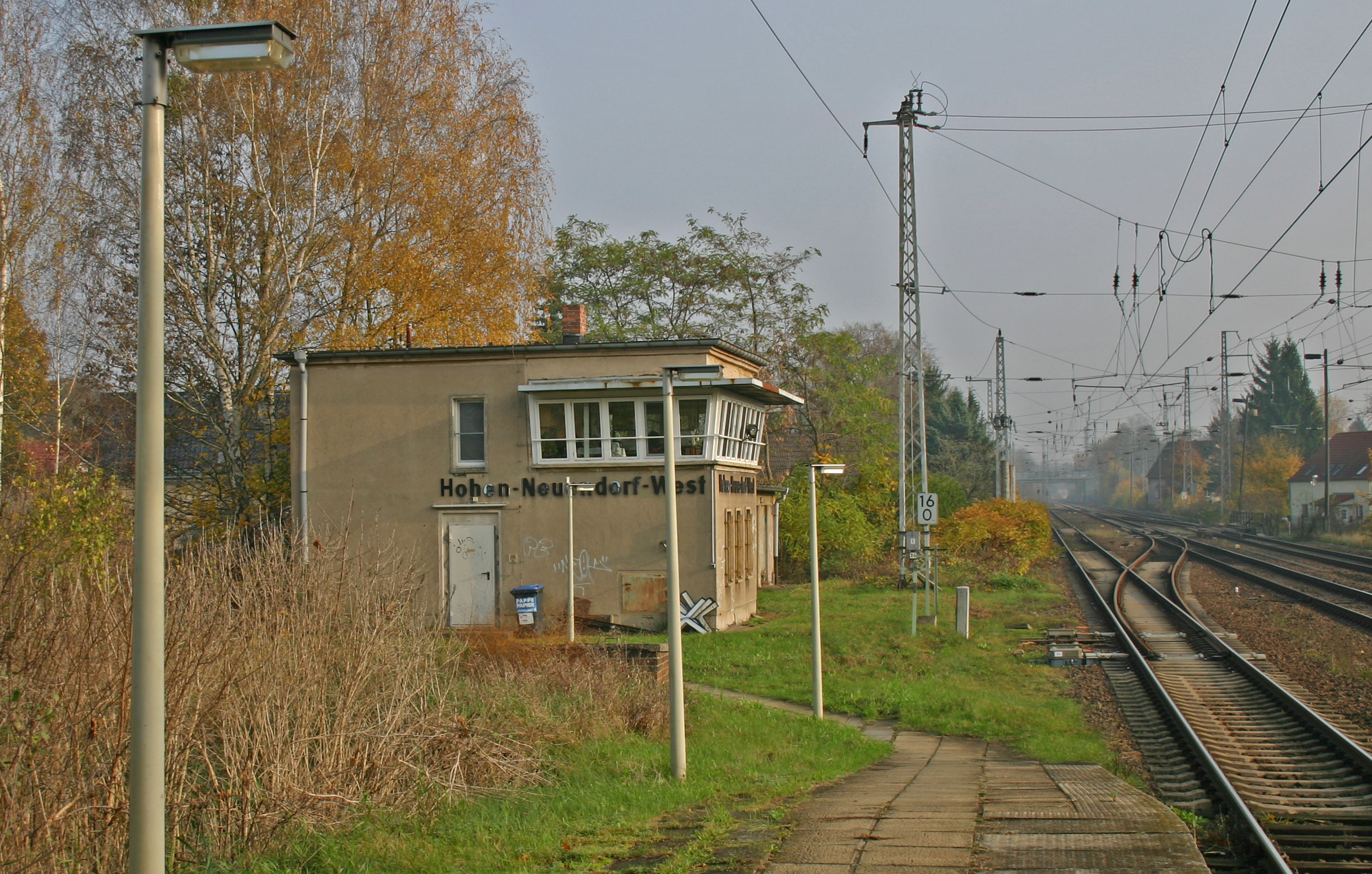
Signal box How in 2014.
