= Altglienicke station =

Railway station in Berlin, Germany

Altglienicke
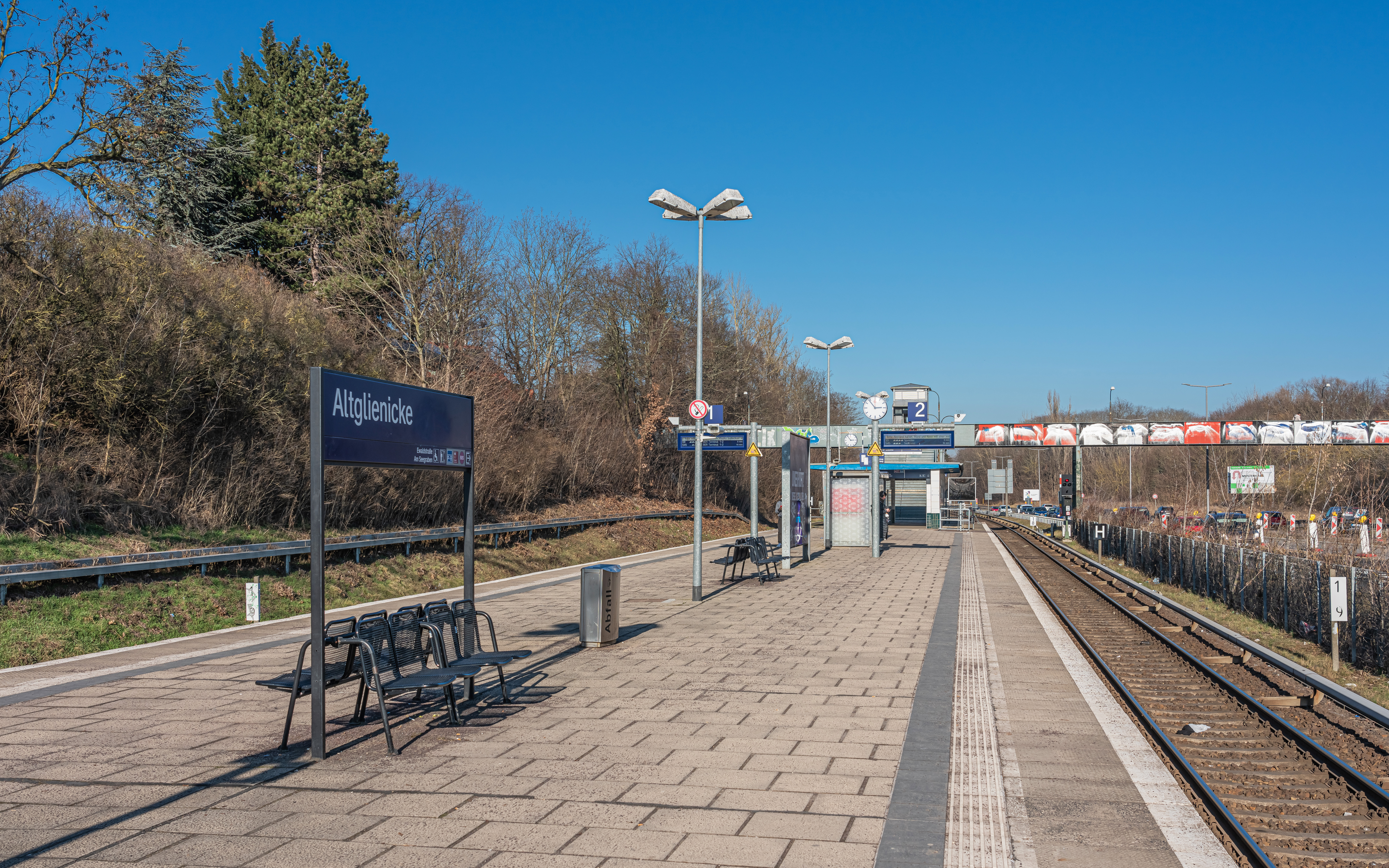

General information
- Location: Germanenstraße 137; 12524 Berlin; Treptow-Köpenick; Germany
- Owner: DB Netz
- Operator: DB Station&Service
- Line: Grünau Cross–Berlin Brandenburg Airport railway
- Platforms: 1 island platform
- Tracks: 2
- Train operators: S-Bahn Berlin
- Connections: : 160

Construction
- Structure type: At-grade
- Accessible: Yes

Other information
- Fare zone: : Berlin B/5656
- Website: www.bahnhof.de

History
- Opened: 1 January 1940; 86 years ago

Services
Preceding station	Berlin S-Bahn	Following station
Adlershof towards Südkreuz	S45	Grünbergallee towards BER Airport
Adlershof towards Spandau	S9	Grünbergallee towards BER Airport
Location

Altglienicke is a railway station on the Grünau Cross–Berlin Brandenburg Airport railway in the Treptow-Köpenick district of Berlin. It is served by S-Bahn lines S45 and S9. It opened for passenger service in 1962, but existed as an operational station on the Berlin Outer Freight Ring since 1940.

== History ==
On 1 January 1940, the station was initially opened as a pure operational station on the Berlin Outer Freight Ring. Until 1948, no passenger service stopped here; a halt was opened on 26 July of that year, and was operational until 21 March 1951. The second operating period lasted between 22 May 1955 and 1 June 1958.

Since 1959, it was planned to open an S-Bahn line in the direction of Berlin Schönefeld Airport. Since a motorway junction was planned near the station, the route runs south of the station in a slight arc on the left hand side of the highway section. On 26 February 1962, the new station on the route to the airport went into operation. The roofless island platform had a small reception building with a ticket office.

Previously, this section of the line was single-track. The second track was put into operation on 29 June 1987, after some reconstruction work took place.

The station has received tactile paving and is accessible via an elevator. The station's only entrance is at the northern end.

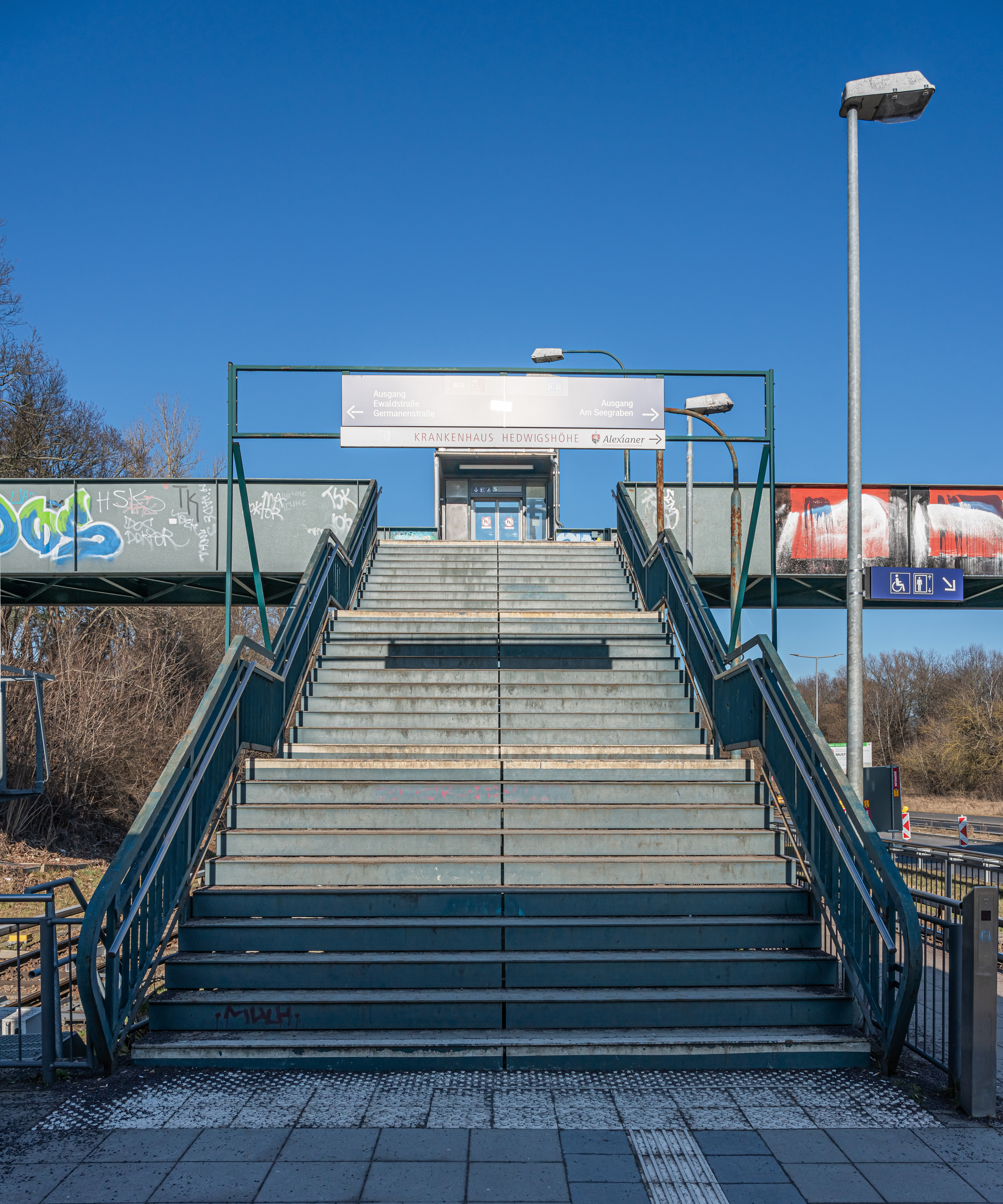
Stairs and elevator
