= Birkenwerder station =

Railway station in Birkenwerder, Germany

Coordinates: 52.6885°N 13.2888°E

Birkenwerder (b Berlin)
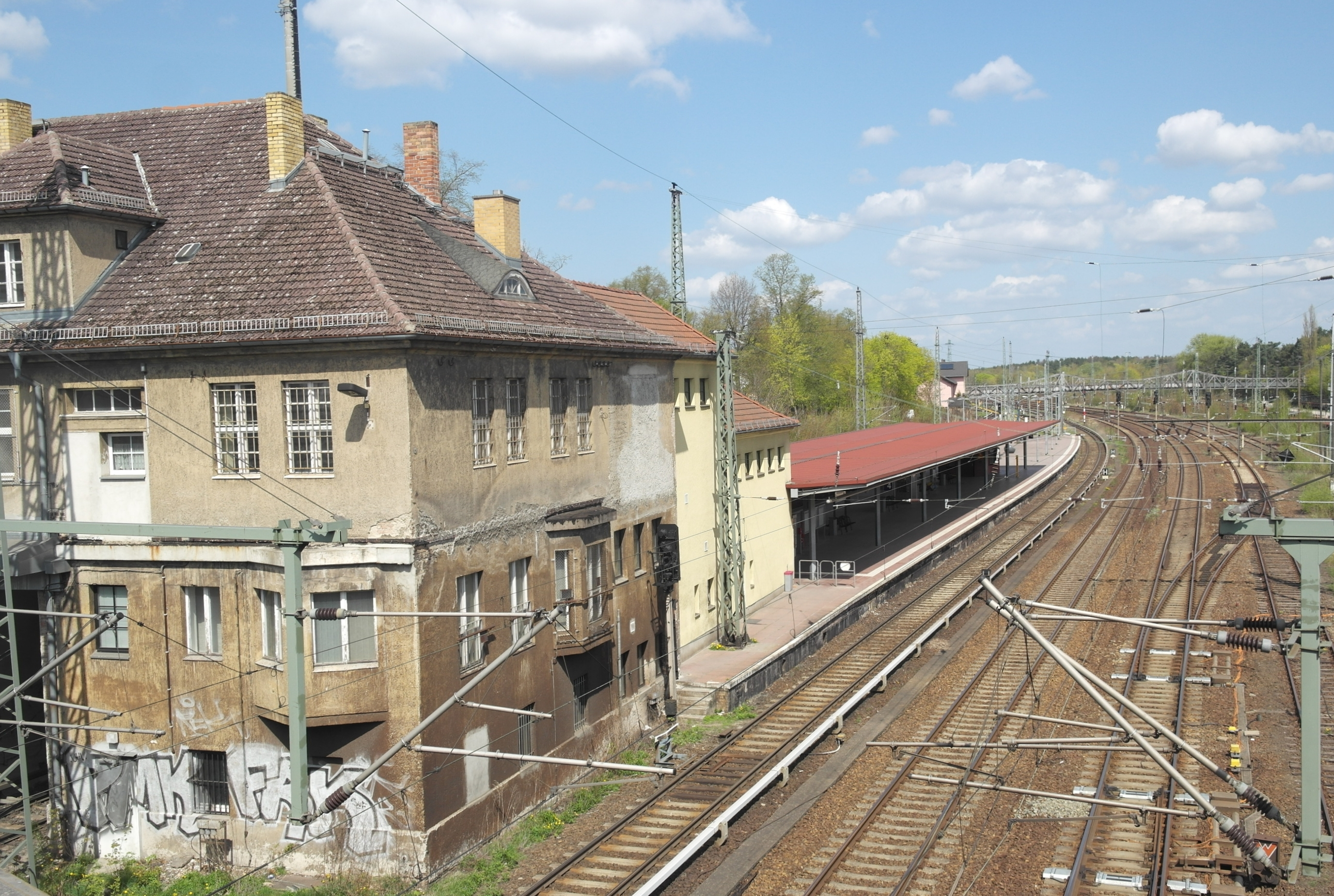

General information
- Location: Birkenwerder, Brandenburg; Germany
- Owner: DB Netz
- Operator: DB Station&Service
- Lines: Berlin Northern Railway (KBS 200.1)
- Platforms: 1 island platform
- Tracks: 2
- Train operators: S-Bahn Berlin

Construction
- Accessible: Yes
- Architect: Richard Brademann

Other information
- Station code: 0661
- DS100 code: BBI
- Category: 4
- Fare zone: : Berlin C/5154
- Website: www.bahnhof.de

History
- Opened: 10 July 1877; 149 years ago
- Electrified: : 5 June 1925; 101 years ago main line: 1 October 1983; 42 years ago
- Former names: 1911-1927 Birkenwerder (Bez. Potsdam)

Key dates
- 1923/1924: current building erected

Services
| Preceding station | DB Regio Nordost | Following station |
|---|---|---|
| Hohen Neuendorf West towards Potsdam Griebnitzsee | RB 20 | Oranienburg Terminus |
| Preceding station | Berlin S-Bahn | Following station |
| Borgsdorf towards Oranienburg | S1 | Hohen Neuendorf towards Wannsee |
| Terminus | S8 | Hohen Neuendorf towards Wildau |
Location

Birkenwerder (German: Bahnhof Birkenwerder) is a railway station in the town of Birkenwerder, Brandenburg, Germany. The station lies on the Berlin Northern Railway and the train services are operated by Deutsche Bahn including Berlin S-Bahn services.

Some of the station's tracks are electrified both with DC via the third rail system of the Berlin S-Bahn and AC via the Deutsche Bahn long-distance overhead line.

The so-called "Rote Brücke" (red bridge), a pedestrian bridge that leads over the railway tracks, is a protected structure.

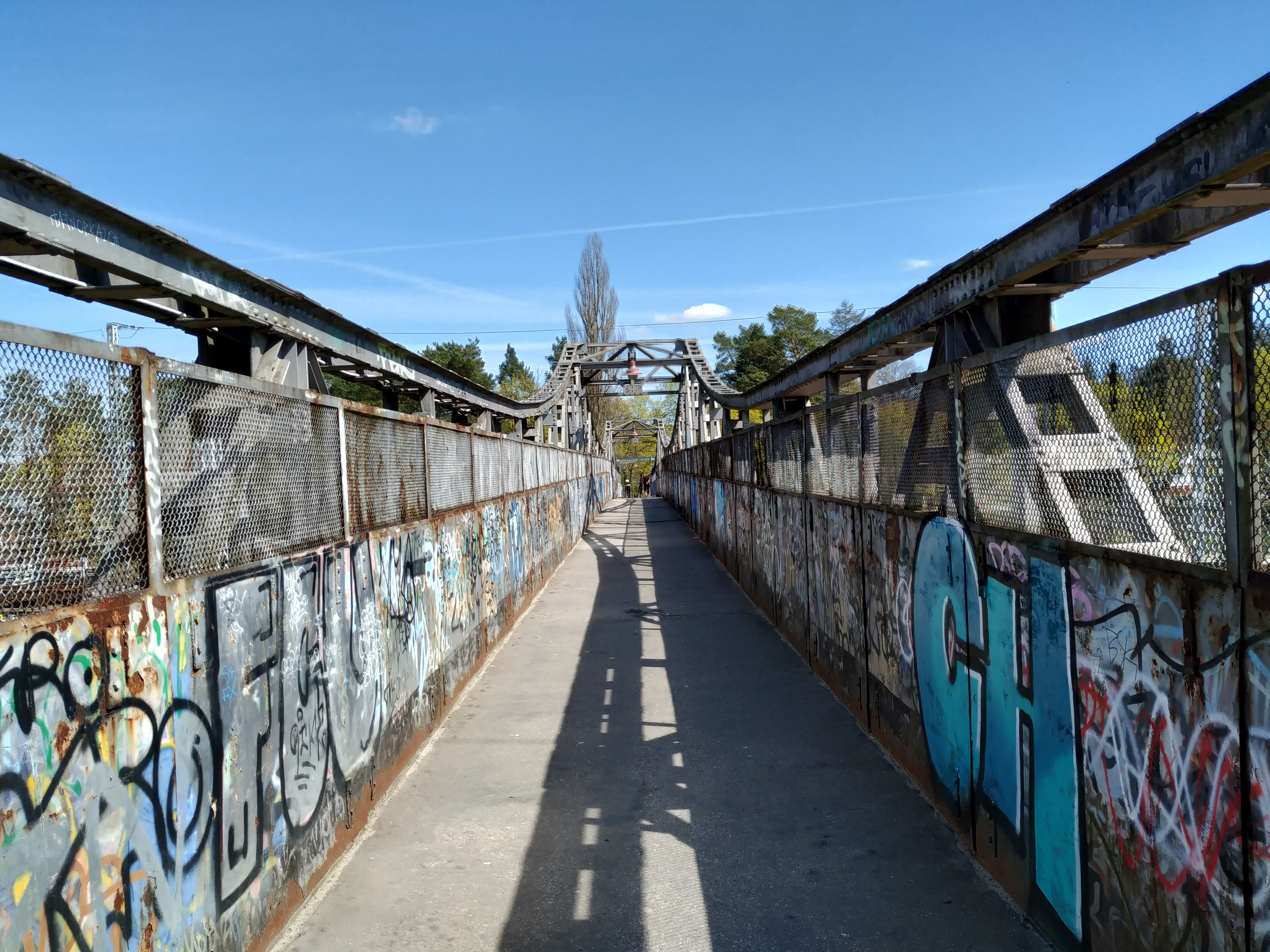
Birkenwerder "Red Bridge"

On 31 May 1992, S1 trains were extended to Hohen Neuendorf, and to Oranienburg after the fall of Berlin Wall. The East Berlin stretch of the line (now S8) was shortened to terminate at this station.

== History ==
=== Beginnings ===
The southern section of the Berlin Northern Railway was opened on 10 July 1877. After the opening, three pairs of trains ran between Berlin and Oranienburg every day, two of them on to Neubrandenburg. Birkenwerder was the stop for all trains. For suburban traffic around Berlin, a few months after the route opened, so-called omnibus trains were also introduced; At the end of 1877, three such trains ran between Berlin and Oranienburg and back.

With the increase in suburban traffic, the line between Berlin and Oranienburg was expanded to two tracks in 1890/1891 and a cheaper suburban fee was introduced between the two cities on 1 October 1891.

In 1981, the number of daily suburban train pairs on this section increased from 8 to 13. In 1892 the Birkenwerder station was named a 3rd class station, it had twelve switches and a fixed loading ramp as well as a private connection.

In the following years, the number of trains continued to increase significantly. Before the First World War, suburban trains ran about once or twice an hour.

=== New station building ===
After the end of the war, it was clear that the line had reached its capacity limit. Work on the four-track expansion between Frohnau and Birkenwerder with separate systems for long-distance and suburban traffic began as early as the end of 1918, initially as an emergency measure. The route was re-routed and all level crossings removed and replaced by overpasses and underpasses. In the Birkenwerder area, the route ran in a cut.

The Birkenwerder station was relocated to the south and received a new station building.

In 1925, the tracks of the suburban railway were fitted with a busbar attached to the side, from which the current collectors of the new electric multiple units could take the direct current for the drive. Electric train operations from Berlin via Hohen Neuendorf began on 5 June, initially to Birkenwerder, and the section to Oranienburg station followed at the beginning of October. A little later, the name "S-Bahn" for the suburban line prevailed. First the trains went to the Szczecin train station in Berlin. After the commissioning of the Berlin north-south tunnel in 1939, the S-Bahn trains ran from the Nordbahn through the tunnel to Berlin-Wannsee, just like today's S1 S-Bahn line.

=== After the Second World War ===
After a brief interruption at the end of the war, S-Bahn operations were resumed on 18 August 1945. Due to the infrastructure being destroyed or dismantled as a reparation payment to the Soviet Union, improvisation had to be carried out for several years. Since long-distance and S-Bahn traffic north of Birkenwerder had to share a single track and the crossing tracks had been dismantled, trains traveling north had to first drive to the sweeping track at Birkenwerder station, wait for the opposite train to pass and then reset.

In the course of the division of Germany and Berlin, the Berlin outer ring was built to bypass West Berlin, which was soon also used for passenger traffic. Trains from Oranienburg to the outer ring stopped at Birkenwerder station. After the Berlin Wall was built in 1961, direct S-Bahn traffic from Oranienburg and Birkenwerder to Berlin was interrupted. A few months later, the Berlin outer ring was provisionally provided with a conductor rail for the S-Bahn traffic and the S-Bahn trains to Berlin took this route from then on.

== Train services ==
The station is served by the following service(s):

- Local services RB 20 Potsdam – Golm – Hennigsdorf – Oranienburg
- Berlin S-Bahn services Oranienburg – Wittenau – Gesundbrunnen – Friedrichstraße – Potsdamer Platz – Schöneberg – Rathaus Steglitz – Wannsee
- Berlin S-Bahn services Birkenwerder – Pankow – Prenzlauer Allee – Ostkreuz – Schöneweide – Grünau – Zeuthen – Wildau
