= Wildau station =

Railway station in Germany

Wildau
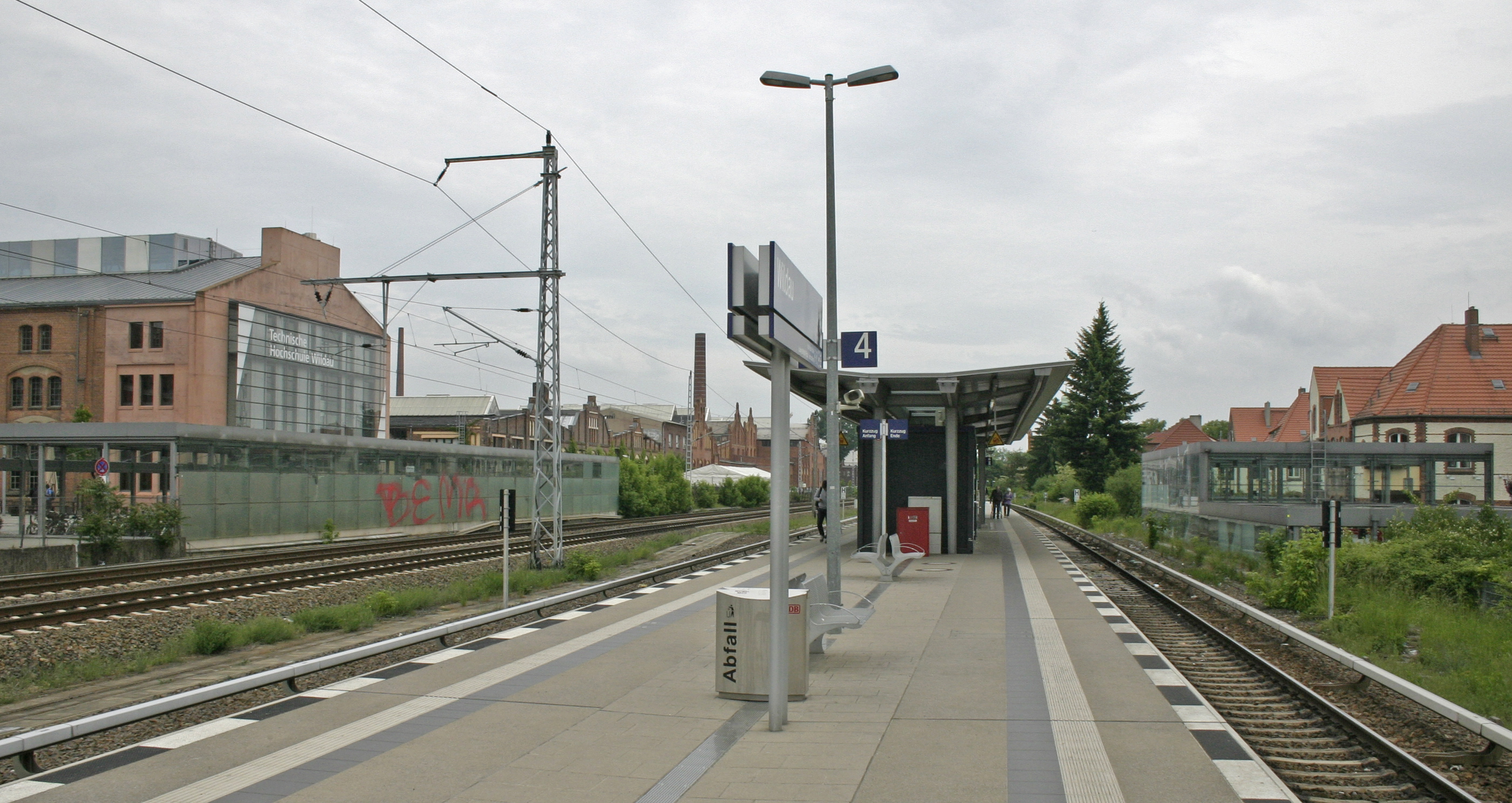

General information
- Location: Wildau, Brandenburg; Germany
- Coordinates: 52°19′12″N 13°38′02″E
- Lines: Berlin–Görlitz (KBS 200.45–9)
- Tracks: 2
- Connections: S46 S8

Other information
- Station code: 6763
- DS100 code: BWI
- Category: 5
- Fare zone: VBB: Berlin C/5959
- Website: www.bahnhof.de

Services
Preceding station	Berlin S-Bahn	Following station
Zeuthen towards Westend	S46	Königs Wusterhausen Terminus
Zeuthen towards Birkenwerder	S8	Terminus
Location

Wildau is a railway station for the village of Wildau in Brandenburg. It is served by the S-Bahn lines S46 and S8.
