= Caputh-Schwielowsee station =

Railway station in Brandenburg, Germany

Caputh Schwielowsee
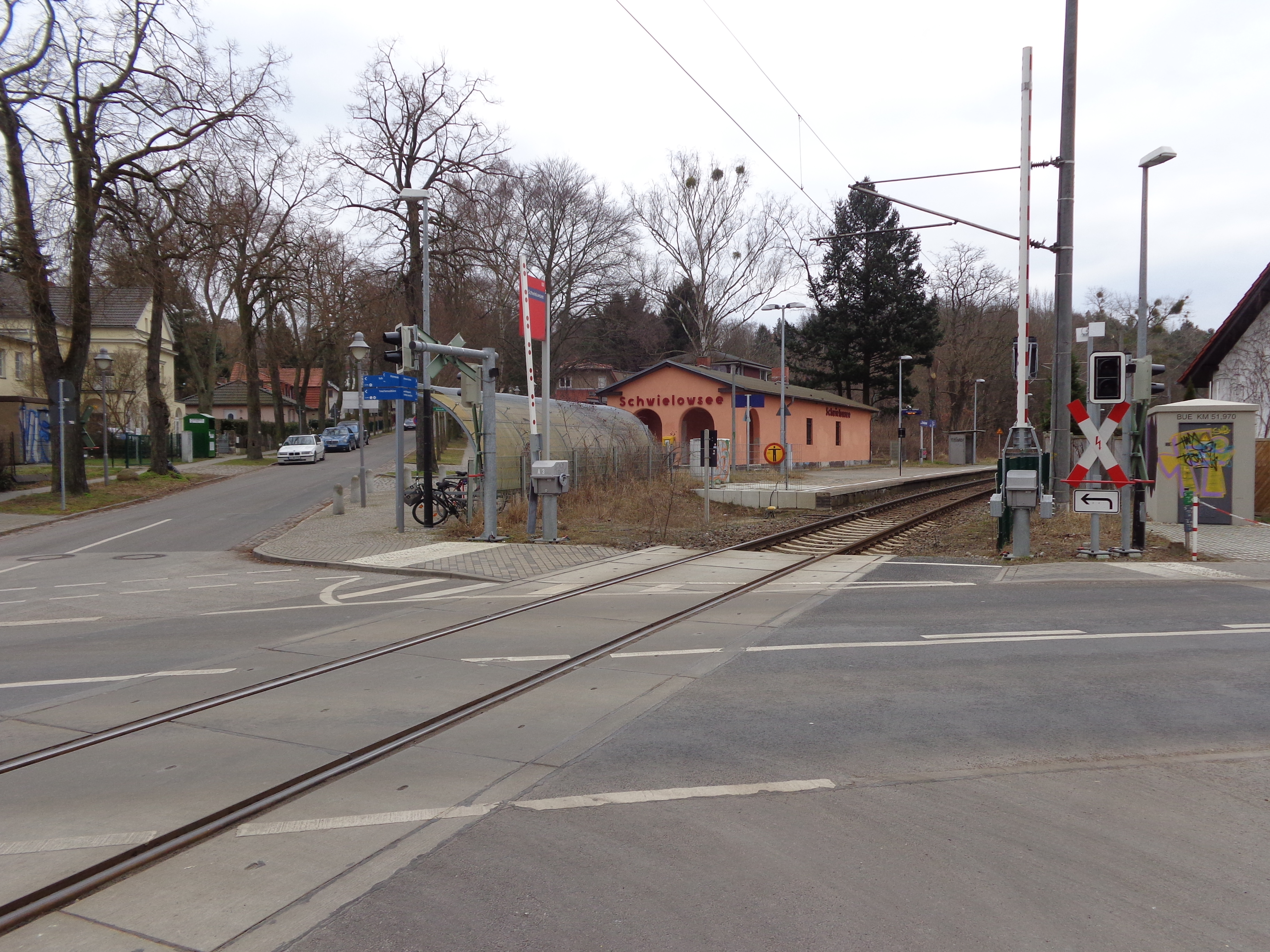
- 2015

General information
- Location: Bahnstraße 1; 14542 Caputh-Schwielowsee; Brandenburg; Germany
- Coordinates: 52°20′28″N 12°58′50″E
- Owner: Deutsche Bahn
- Operator: DB Netz; DB Station&Service
- Line: Jüterbog–Nauen railway
- Train operators: DB Regio Nordost
- Connections: 607

Other information
- Station code: 5767
- DS100 code: BSIS
- IBNR: 8012957
- Category: 6
- Fare zone: VBB: Berlin C and Potsdam C/5949
- Website: www.bahnhof.de

History
- Opened: 5 November 1923; 102 years ago

Services
Preceding station	Ostdeutsche Eisenbahn	Following station
Caputh-Geltow towards Potsdam Hbf	RB 33	Ferch-Lienewitz towards Jüterbog
Location

Caputh-Schwielowsee station is a railway station in Caputh, district of the municipality Schwielowsee located in the district of Potsdam-Mittelmark, Brandenburg, Germany.

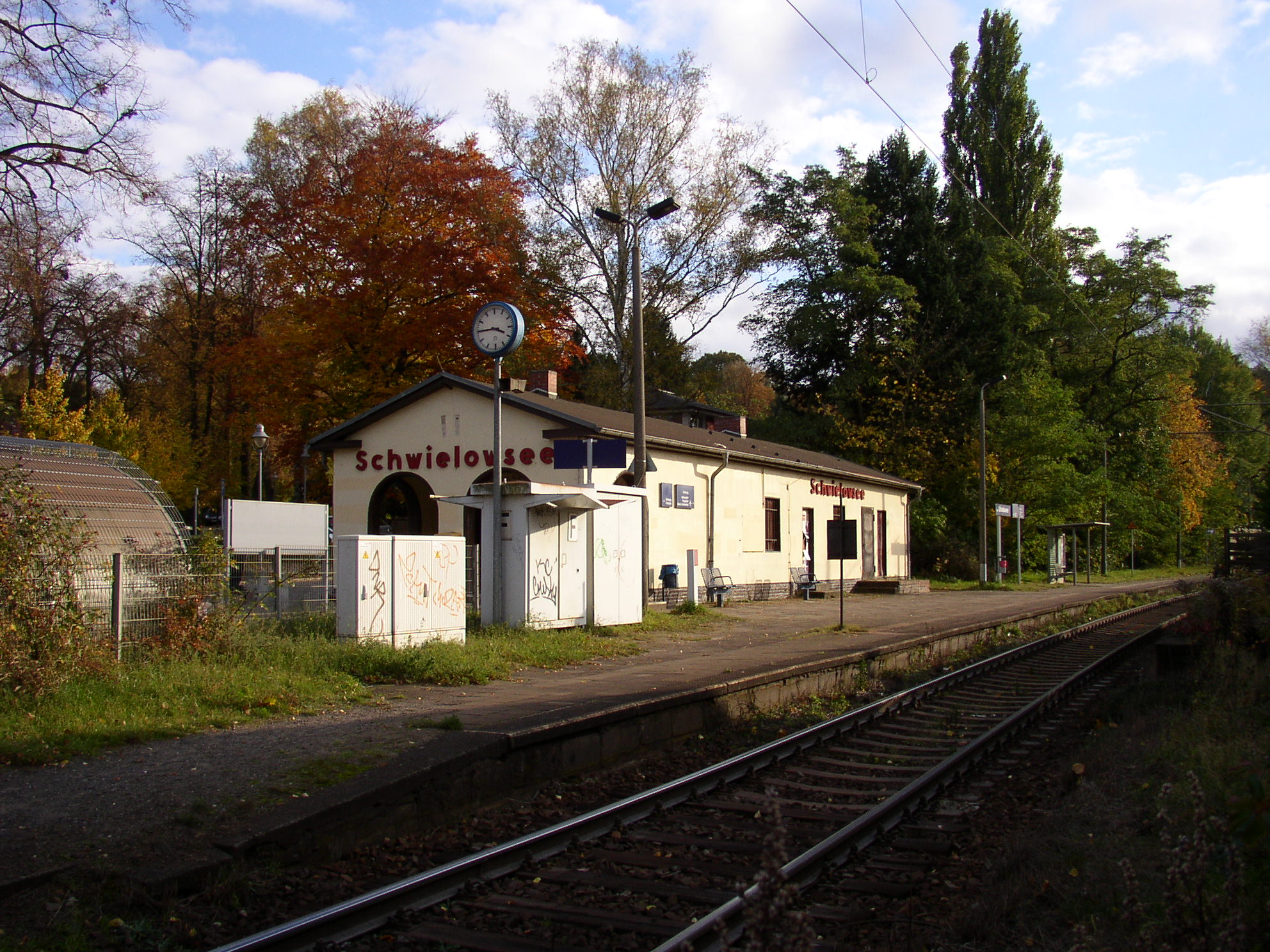
Caputh-Schwielowsee station in October 2007
