= Caputh Ferry =

Coordinates: 52.347498°N 12.985282°E

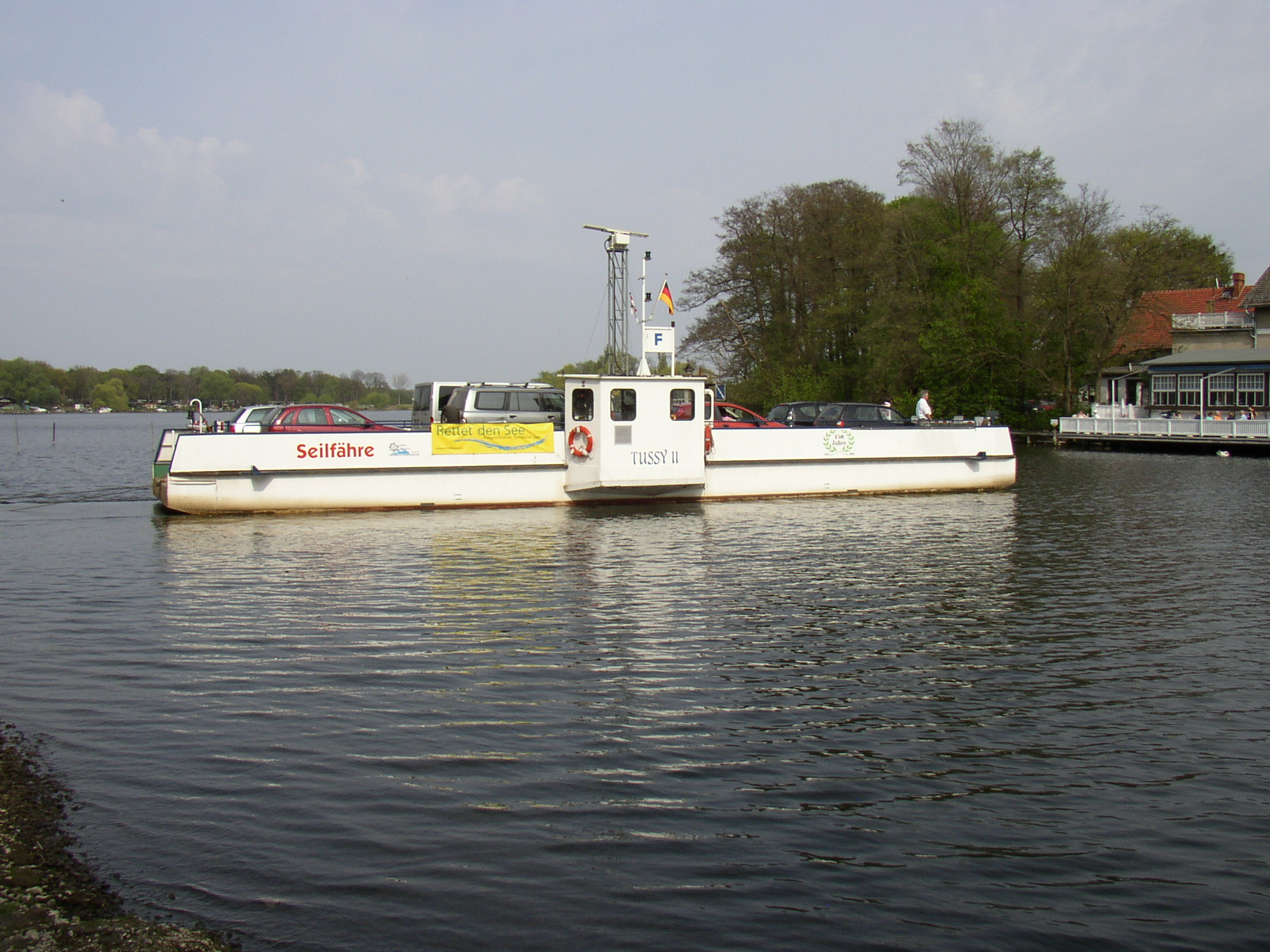
The ferry boat Tussy II.

The Caputh Ferry is a vehicular cable ferry in the municipality of Schwielowsee of the state of Brandenburg, Germany. It crosses the River Havel at its outlet from the Templiner See to the Schwielowsee, and crosses between the villages of Caputh and Geltow.
