= Caputh-Geltow station =

Train station in Potsdam-Mittelmark, Brandenburg, Germany

Caputh-Geltow
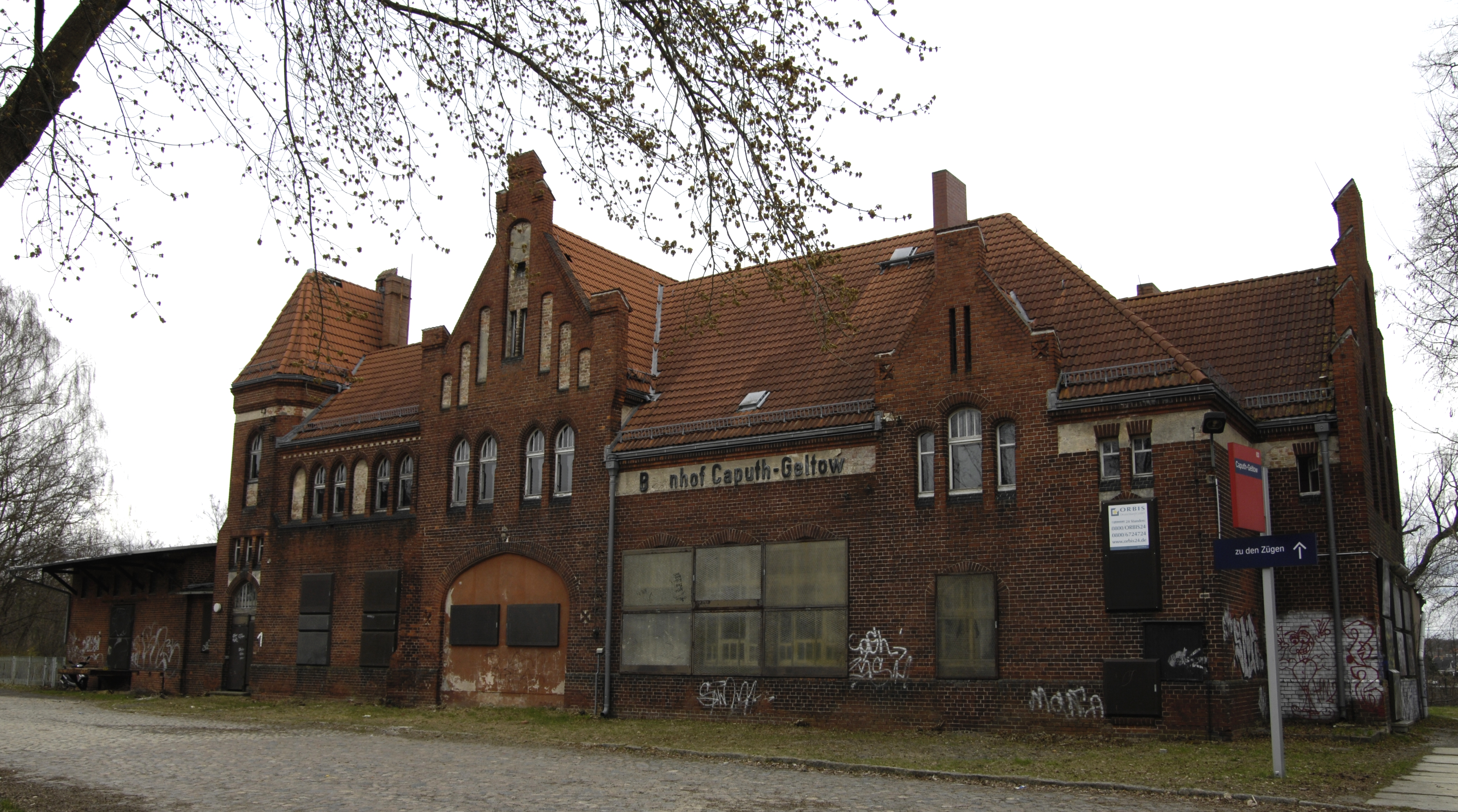
- 2010

General information
- Location: Am Bahnhof; 14542 Caputh-Geltow; Brandenburg; Germany
- Coordinates: 52°21′02″N 12°59′05″E
- Owner: DB Netz
- Operator: DB Station&Service
- Line: Jüterbog–Nauen railway
- Train operators: DB Regio Nordost

Other information
- Station code: 1029
- DS100 code: BCAP
- IBNR: 8011308
- Category: 7
- Fare zone: VBB: Berlin C and Potsdam C/5949
- Website: www.bahnhof.de

History
- Opened: 1 October 1908; 117 years ago

Services
Preceding station	Ostdeutsche Eisenbahn	Following station
Potsdam Pirschheide towards Potsdam Hbf	RB 33	Caputh-Schwielowsee towards Jüterbog
Location

Caputh-Geltow station is a railway station in Geltow, district of the municipality Schwielowsee located in the district of Potsdam-Mittelmark, Brandenburg, Germany.
