= Templiner See =

Lake in Brandenburg, Germany

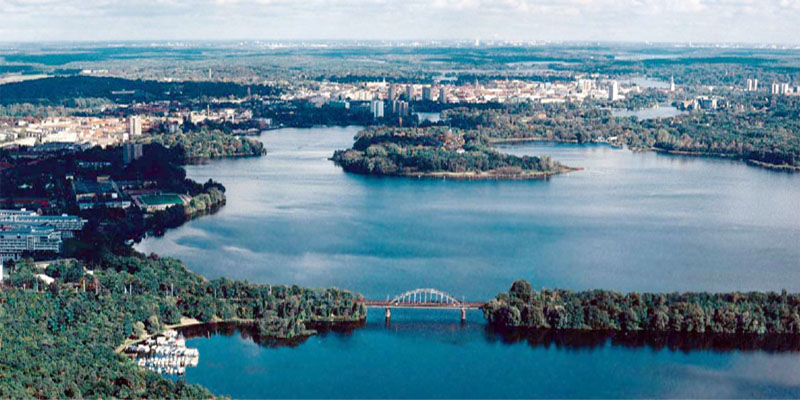
- The Templiner See looking north, with the Berlin outer ring railway in the foreground, and the Hermannswerder peninsula behind.

- Location within Brandenburg
- Location: Brandenburg
- Coordinates: 52°22′3″N 13°1′6″E
- Primary inflows: River Havel
- Primary outflows: River Havel
- Basin countries: Germany
- Max. length: 5.8 kilometres (3.6 mi)
- Max. width: 1.2 kilometres (0.75 mi)
- Surface area: 5.11 square kilometres (1.97 sq mi)
- Max. depth: 6 metres (20 ft)
- Surface elevation: 29.4 metres (96 ft)
- Settlements: Potsdam, Caputh, Geltow

Templiner See (German pronunciation: [tɛmˈpliːnɐ zeː]) is a lake in the state of Brandenburg, Germany. It stretches to the south and west from the centre of the city of Potsdam.

The lake is some 5.8 kilometres (3.6 mi) long, with a maximum width of 1.2 kilometres (0.75 mi) and a surface area is 5.11 square kilometres (1.97 sq mi). It lies at an elevation of 29.4 metres (96 ft) above sea level, and has a maximum depth of 6 metres (20 ft).

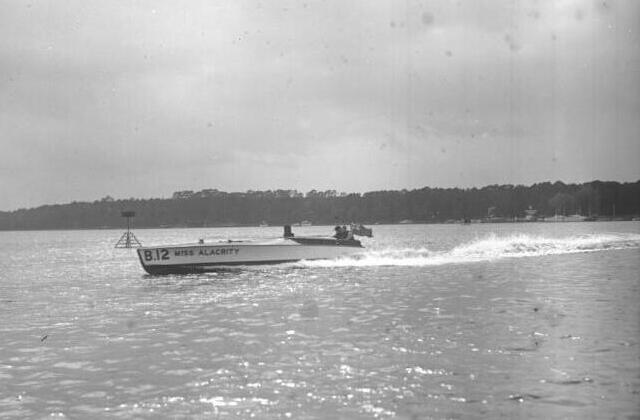
Motorboat race in 1929: Henry Segrave's Miss Alacrity

The navigable River Havel flows through the lake, entering it at its northern end adjacent to central Potsdam, and leaving it at its southern end via a short channel to the Schwielowsee between Caputh and Geltow. The lake is crossed by two cable ferries, the Kiewitt Ferry towards its northern end, and the Caputh Ferry at its southern exit. Navigation is administered as part of the Untere Havel–Wasserstraße.

At the northern end of the lake, the peninsula of Hermannswerder protrudes into the lake. At about its midpoint, the lake is crossed by the Berlin outer ring railway, using an embankment and bridge. This was built in the 1950s, to bypass West Berlin during the division of Germany.

== Albert Einstein Summer Home ==
From 1929 to 1932 Albert Einstein and his wife Elsa, then living in Berlin, had a summer house by the lake in Caputh. He kept a sail boat at the lake and sailed on the Templiner See and the Havel river lakes.

== See also ==
- Villa Carlshagen
