= Ferch-Lienewitz station =

Train station in Potsdam-Mittelmark, Brandenburg, Germany

Ferch-Lienewitz
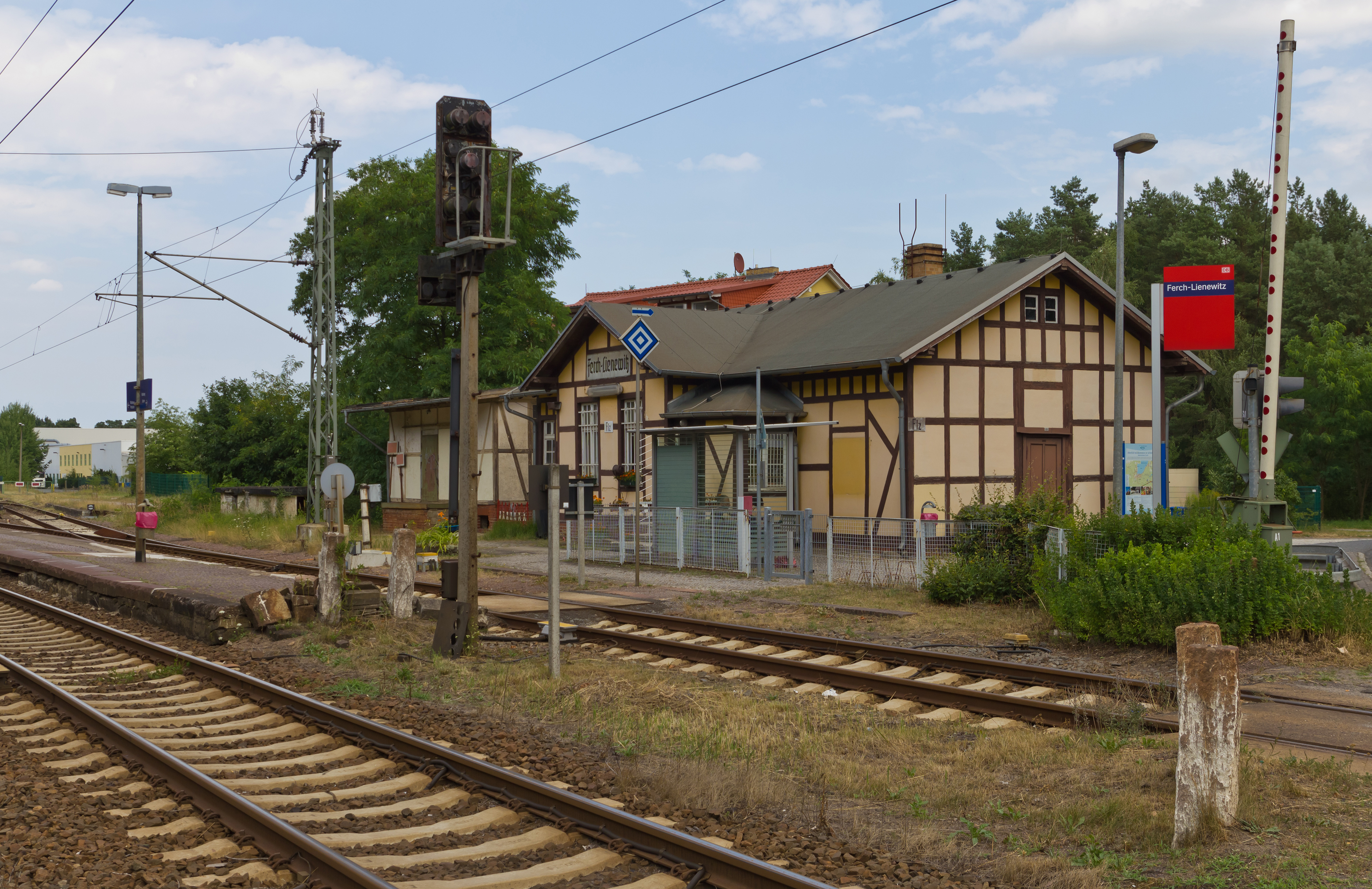
- 2013

General information
- Location: Am Bahnhof 1; 14542 Schwielowsee; Brandenburg; Germany
- Coordinates: 52°18′14″N 12°57′52″E
- Owner: DB Netz
- Operator: DB Station&Service
- Line: Jüterbog–Nauen railway
- Train operators: DB Regio Nordost

Other information
- Station code: 1777
- DS100 code: BFLZ
- IBNR: 8013480
- Category: 6
- Fare zone: VBB: Berlin C and Potsdam C/5949
- Website: www.bahnhof.de

History
- Opened: 1 October 1908; 117 years ago

Services
Preceding station	Ostdeutsche Eisenbahn	Following station
Caputh Schwielowsee towards Potsdam Hbf	RB 33	Beelitz Stadt towards Jüterbog
Location

Ferch-Lienewitz station is a railway station in Ferch-Lienewitz, district of the municipality Schwielowsee located in the district of Potsdam-Mittelmark, Brandenburg, Germany.

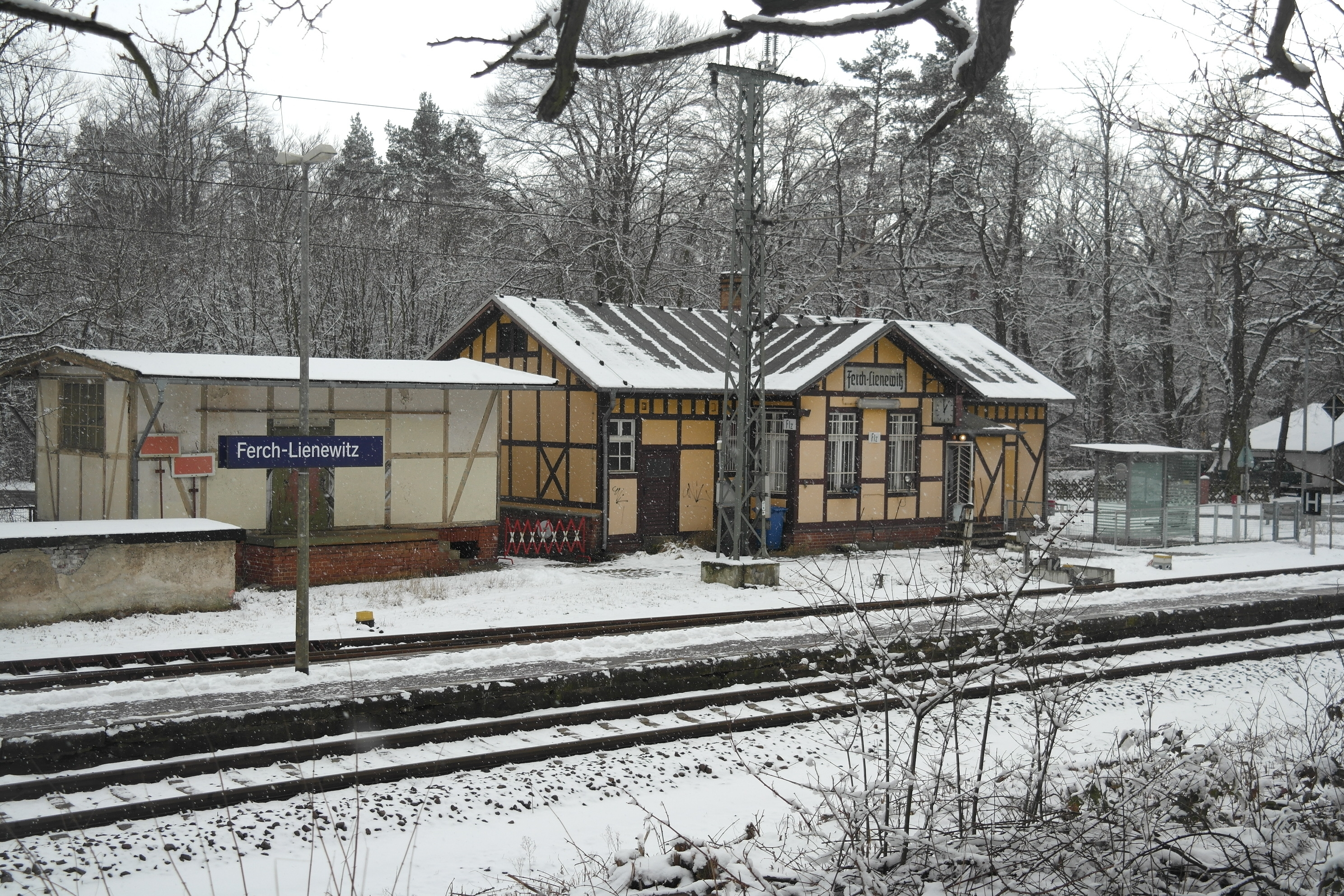
Ferch-Lienewitz station in winter 2013.
