= Kiewitt Ferry =

Coordinates: 52.388304°N 13.039463°E

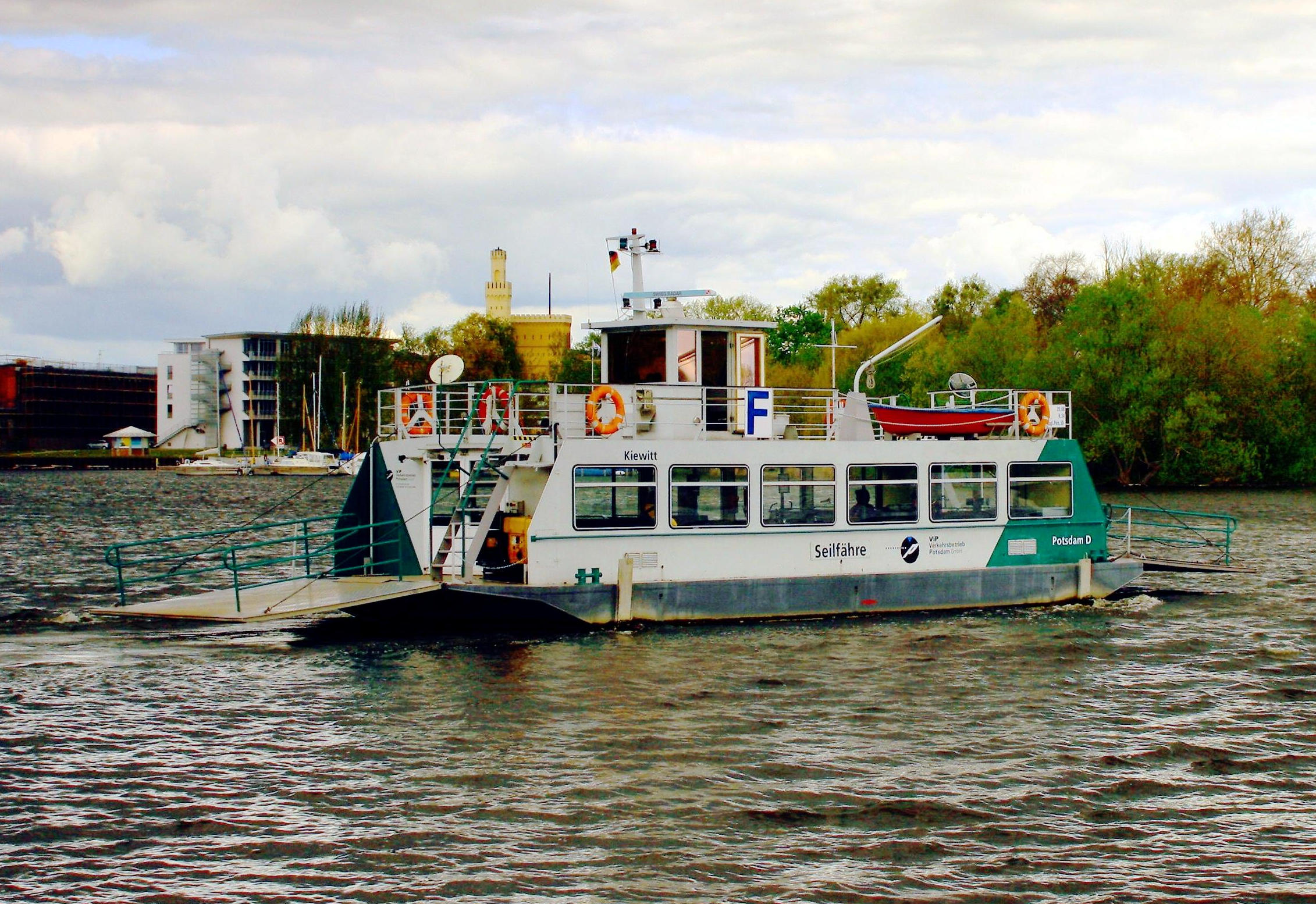
The Kiewitt Ferry

The Kiewitt Ferry is a passenger cable ferry in the city of Potsdam in Brandenburg, Germany. It crosses the Havel river, at the northern end of the Templiner See, between Auf dem Kiewitt on the Potsdam side and the Hermannswerder peninsular.

The ferry is operated by Verkehrsbetrieb Potsdam, who also operate the city's tram and bus networks, and is numbered as line F1. It operates every 15 minutes or 30 minutes from 7am to 6pm.

== See also ==
- Ferry transport in Berlin
