= Konrad Wachsmann =

German architect (1901–1980)

Konrad Wachsmann (May 16, 1901 in Frankfurt an der Oder, Germany – November 25, 1980 in Los Angeles, California) was a German Jewish modernist architect. He is notable for his contribution to the mass production of building components.

Originally apprenticed as a cabinetmaker, Wachsmann studied at the arts-and-crafts schools of Berlin and Dresden and at the Berlin Academy of Arts (under the Expressionist architect Hans Poelzig). During the late 1920s he was chief architect for a manufacturer of timber buildings. He designed a summer house for Albert Einstein, one of his lifelong friends, in Caputh, Brandenburg. He received the Prix de Rome from the German Academy in Rome in 1932.

In 1938 he emigrated to Paris and in 1941 to the United States, where he began a collaboration with Walter Gropius and developed the "Packaged House System", a design for a house which could be constructed in less than nine hours. Before the end of the Second World War he also developed a mobile aircraft hangar for the Atlas Aircraft Corporation. He would later design aircraft hangars for the U.S. Air Force in the 1960s.

In 1943 he assisted the war effort by helping the US air-force construct the German Village (Dugway proving ground), a simulation of German working class dwellings to be used to perfect fire-bombing techniques on German residential areas.

Wachsmann taught at the Illinois Institute of Technology in Chicago from 1949 to 1964 and at the USC School of Architecture-SAFA at main campus at the University of Southern California in Los Angeles from 1964 to 1979. He was the first recipient of the Neutra Medal for Professional Excellence in 1980.

He is buried in his native Frankfurt an der Oder.
