= Schwielowsee =

Lake in Brandenburg, Germany

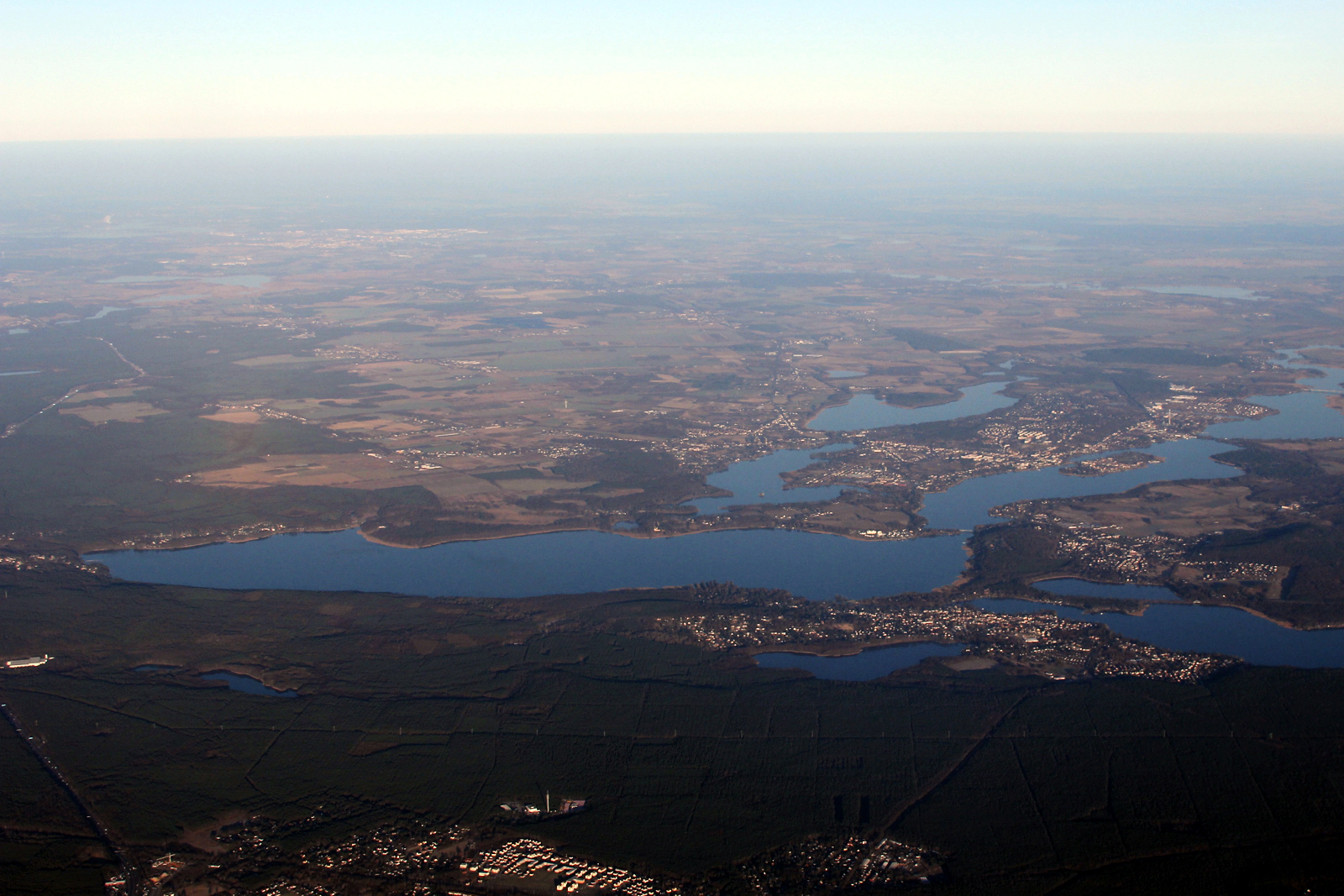
- Aerial picture of Schwielowsee and surroundings

- Location within Brandenburg

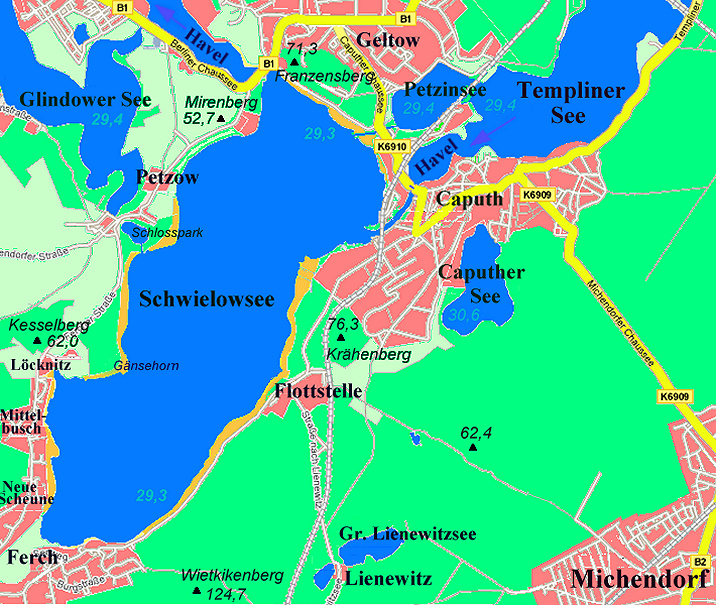
- Map of the lake
- Location: Brandenburg
- Coordinates: 52.337752°N 12.954941°E
- Primary inflows: River Havel
- Primary outflows: River Havel
- Basin countries: Germany
- Max. length: 5.4 kilometres (3.4 mi)
- Max. width: 2.0 kilometres (1.2 mi)
- Surface area: 7.86 square kilometres (3.03 sq mi)
- Max. depth: 9.1 metres (30 ft)
- Surface elevation: 29.3 metres (96 ft)
- Settlements: Caputh, Ferch, Geltow

Schwielowsee (German pronunciation: [ˈʃviːloːˌzeː]) is a lake in the state of Brandenburg, Germany. It is situated to the south and west of the city of Potsdam. The villages of Caputh, Ferch and Geltow, on the banks of the lake, form the municipality of Schwielowsee.

The lake is some 5.4 kilometres (3.4 mi) long, with a maximum width of 2.0 kilometres (1.2 mi) and a surface area is 7.86 square kilometres (3.03 sq mi). It lies at an elevation of 29.3 metres (96 ft) above sea level, and has a maximum depth of 9.1 metres (30 ft).

The navigable River Havel flows through the eastern end of the lake, entering it at Caputh via a short channel from the Templiner See, and exiting to the north. The lake is also navigable to its south-western end at Ferch. Navigation is administered as part of the Untere Havel–Wasserstraße.

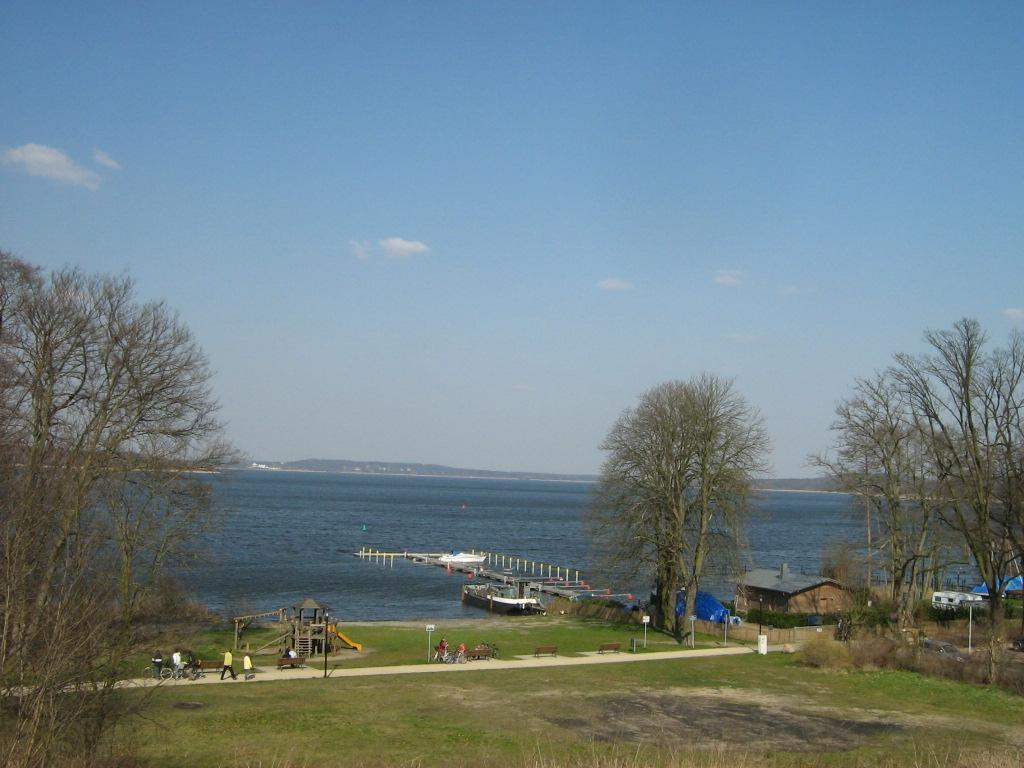
View of the lake from Ferch
