= Schwielowsee (municipality) =

- Municipality
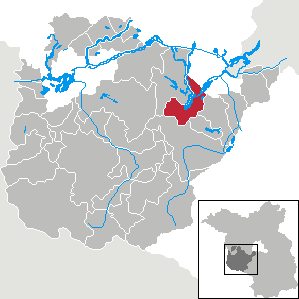
- Location of Schwielowsee within Potsdam-Mittelmark district
- Interactive map of Schwielowsee
- Location within Germany Location within Brandenburg
- Coordinates: 52°20′N 12°58′E
- Country: Germany
- State: Brandenburg
- District: Potsdam-Mittelmark
- Subdivisions: 3 Ortsteile

Government
  - Mayor (2018–26): Kerstin Hoppe (CDU)

Area
  - Total: 58.15 km^{2} (22.45 sq mi)
- Elevation: 68 m (223 ft)

Population (2025-12-31)
  - Total: 10,741
  - Density: 184.7/km^{2} (478.4/sq mi)
- Time zone: UTC+01:00 (CET)
  - Summer (DST): UTC+02:00 (CEST)
- Postal codes: 14548
- Dialling codes: 033209, 03327
- Vehicle registration: PM
- Website: www.schwielowsee.de

Schwielowsee (German pronunciation: [ˈʃviːloːˌzeː]) is a municipality in the Potsdam-Mittelmark district, in Brandenburg, Germany. It is situated on the shore of the Schwielowsee lake, through which the River Havel flows. The municipality was founded on December 31, 2002 in merger of the three villages Caputh, Geltow and Ferch. The Caputh Ferry, a cable ferry across the Havel, links Caputh and Geltow. In the east Schwielowsee shares border with the City of Potsdam, in the west with the town of Werder (Havel).

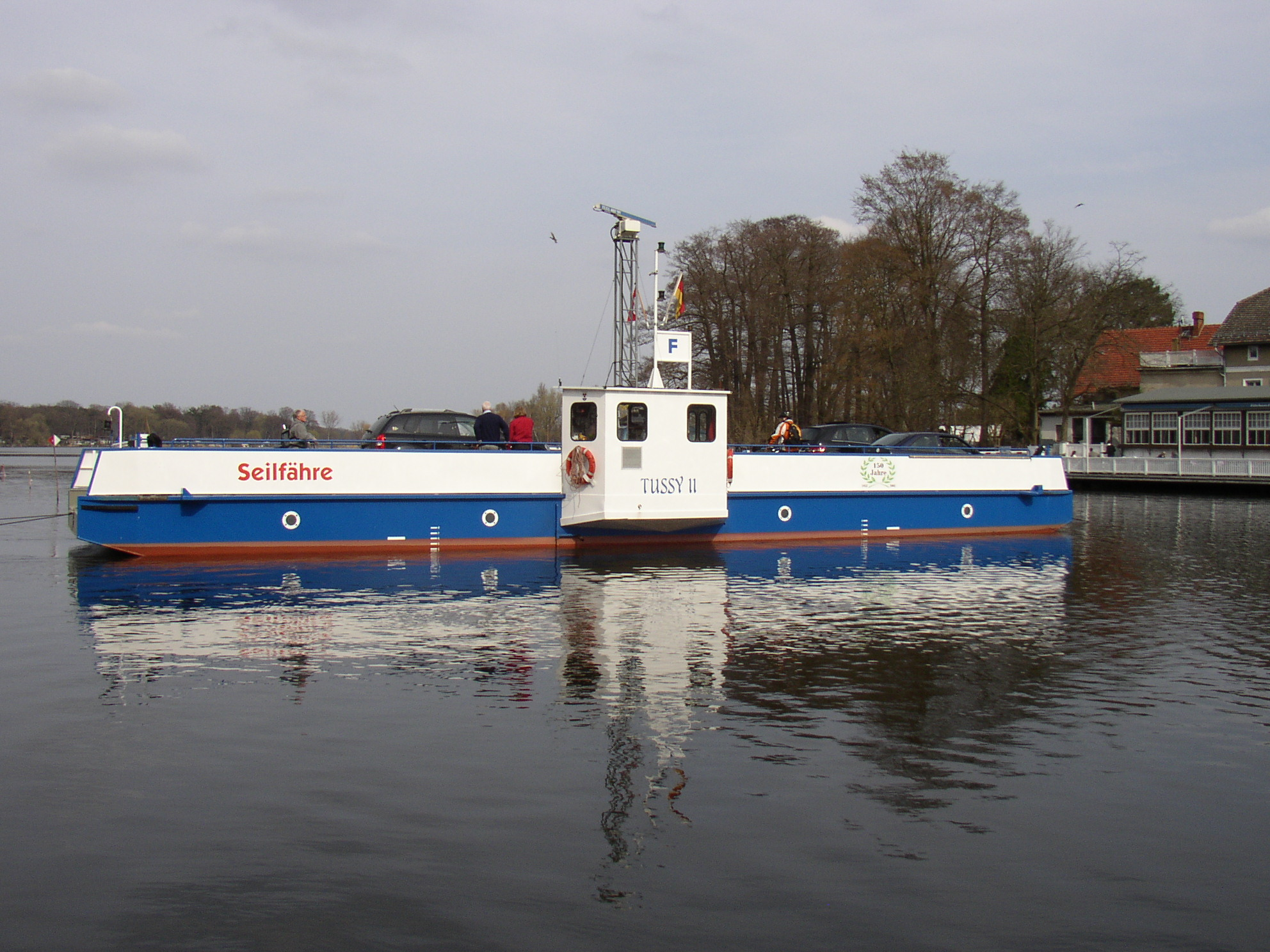
"Tussi II" cable ferry

== History ==
Geltow (together with Potsdam) was first mentioned as Slavic Geliti within the Hevelli lands in a 993 deed by Emperor Otto III, who ceded it to his aunt, abbess Matilda of Quedlinburg. The ford in the Havel had been a significant river-crossing since ancient times. Today the Bundesstraße 1 federal highway crosses the river at the Baumgartenbrücke.

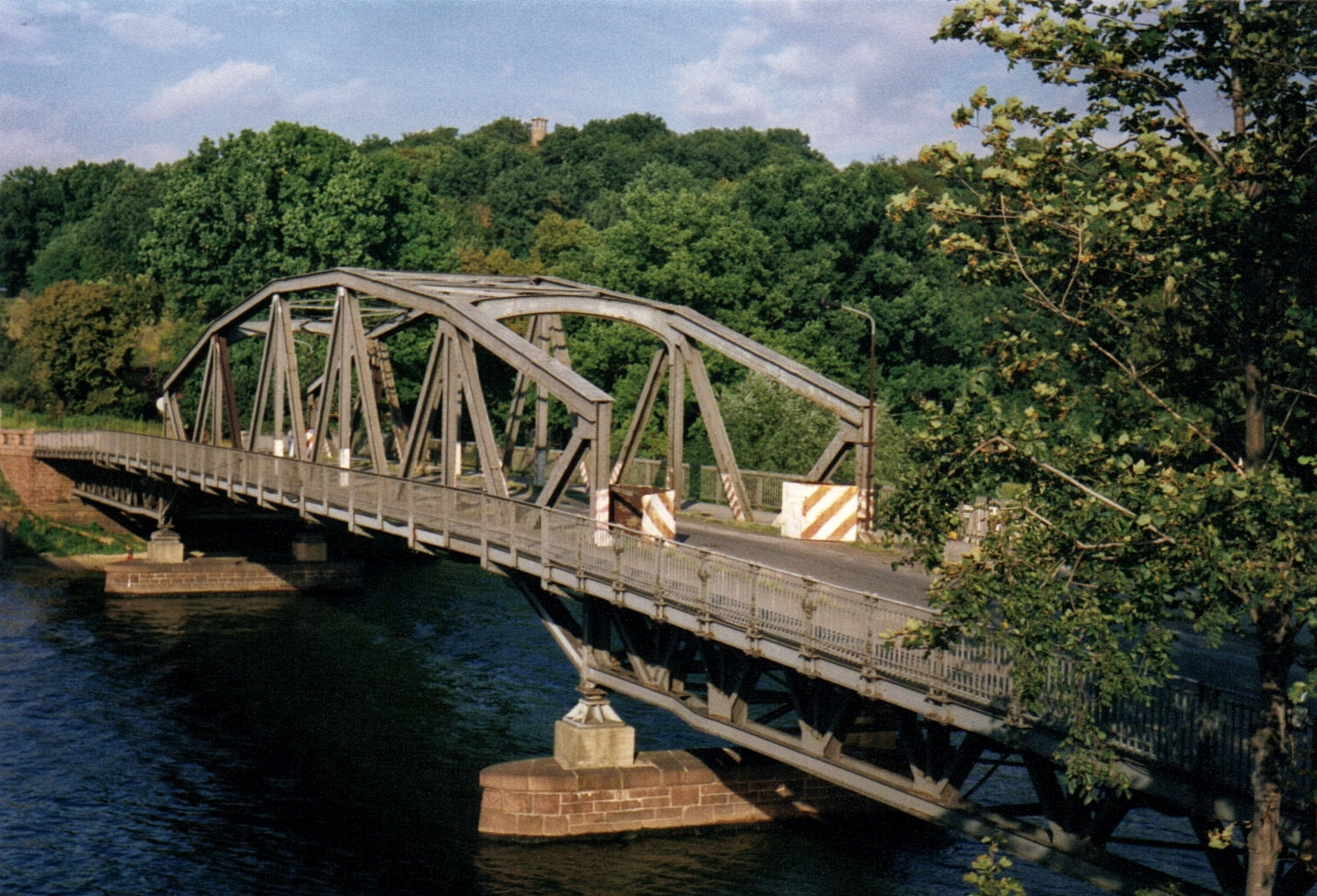
Semi-provisional Baumgarten-brücke from 1950 in 1985

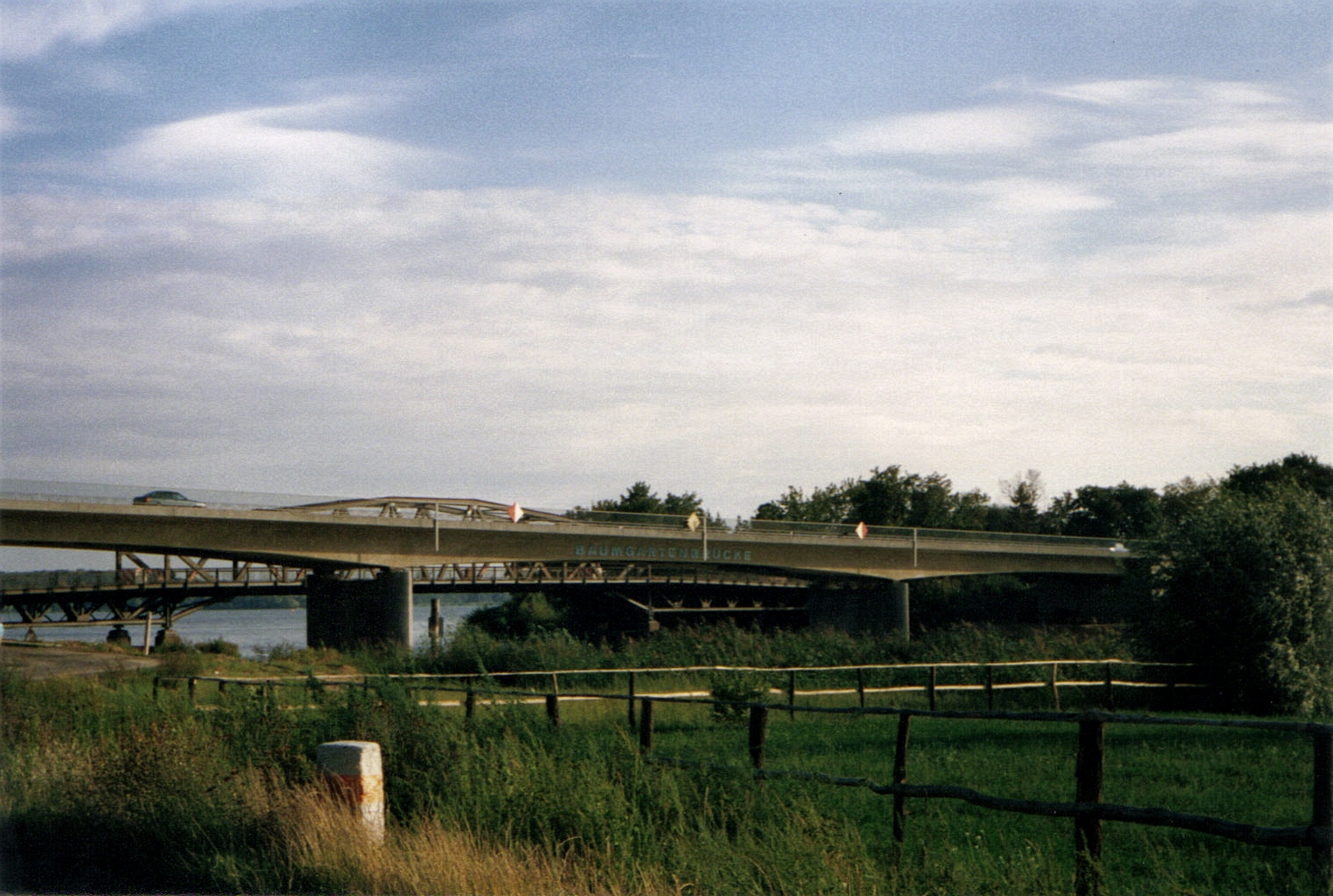
Current Baumgartenbrücke, since 1989

== Demography ==
Development of population since 1875 within the current Boundaries (Blue Line: Population; Dotted Line: Comparison to Population development in Brandenburg state; Grey Background: Time of Nazi Germany; Red Background: Time of communist East Germany)

Recent Population Development and Projections (Population Development before Census 2011 (blue line); Recent Population Development according to the Census in Germany in 2011 (blue bordered line); Official projections for 2005-2030 (yellow line); for 2017-2030 (scarlet line);; for 2020-2030 (green line)

Schwielowsee: Population development
within the current boundaries (2020)

Year	Pop.	±% p.a.
1875	2,649	—
1890	3,240	+1.35%
1910	4,512	+1.67%
1925	5,074	+0.79%
1939	6,204	+1.45%
1950	7,422	+1.64%
1964	6,767	−0.66%

Year	Pop.	±% p.a.
1971	6,868	+0.21%
1981	6,572	−0.44%
1985	6,470	−0.39%
1990	6,199	−0.85%
1995	6,805	+1.88%
2000	8,710	+5.06%
2005	9,685	+2.14%

Year	Pop.	±% p.a.
2010	10,187	+1.02%
2015	10,494	+0.60%
2016	10,567	+0.70%
2017	10,624	+0.54%
2018	10,650	+0.24%
2019	10,705	+0.52%
2020	10,758	+0.50%

== Sights ==
=== Caputh ===
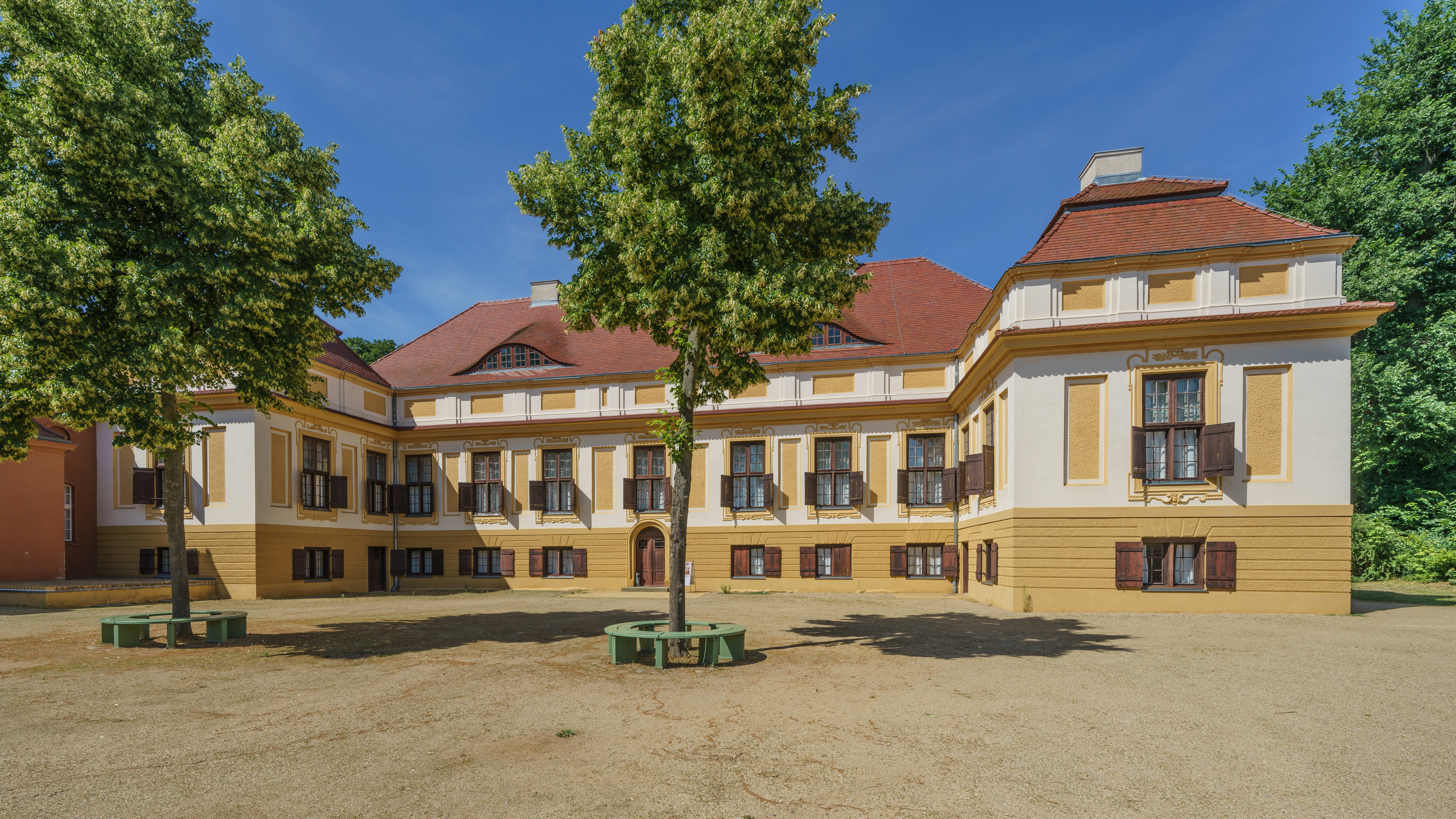
Caputh Palace

Caputh got a railway station in 1904. Since early 20th century it was appraised as a remote residencial area by wealthy urban people.

- Caputh Palace, built in 1662 by Philip de Chiese, quartermaster general of Elector Frederick William of Brandenburg. In 1671 Frederick William gave the palace to his second wife Dorothea of Schleswig-Holstein-Sonderburg-Glücksburg. Notable is the Tile Hall (Fliesensaal) of 1720 with about 7,500 pieces of Delftware tiles, placed by order of King Frederick William I of Prussia. The park was designed by Peter Joseph Lenné in 1820.
- The Caputh village church is a work by Friedrich August Stüler. Built in a basilica form, it was consecrated in 1852 in the presence of King Frederick William IV of Prussia.

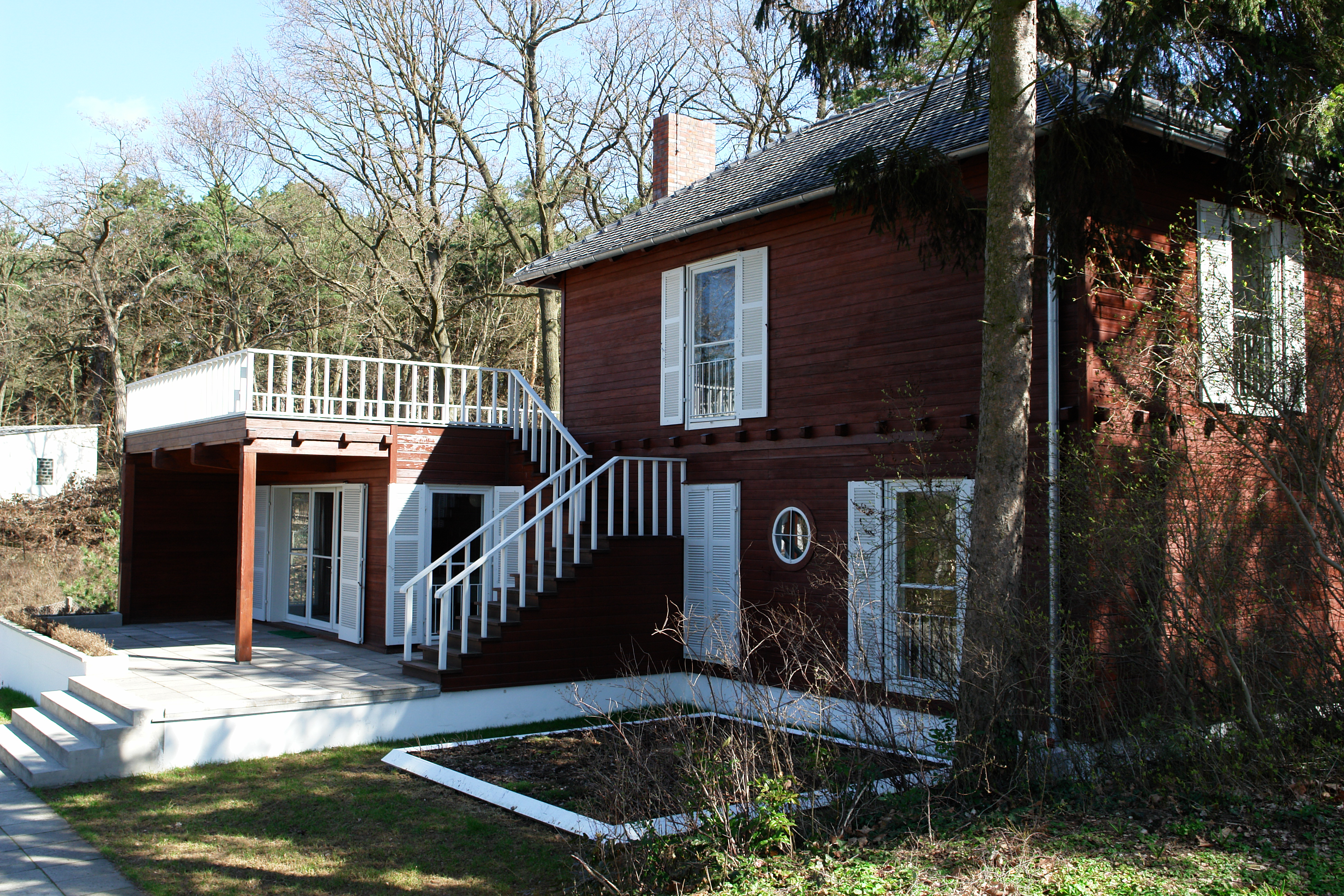
Einstein's residence

- Summer house of Albert Einstein in Caputh, built in 1929 by the architect Konrad Wachsmann. Einstein, though a non swimmer, was a passionate recreational sailor on the lake, but was only able to use his retreat until the Nazi takeover in 1933. After German reunification and the restitution to the Einstein family, the house is now a property of the Hebrew University of Jerusalem.

=== Geltow ===
Geltow was always passed by a lot of strangers on the main road. Like Caputh it has a railway station since 1904. The village church of Geltow was built according to plans of the unlucky Emperor Frederick III after the model of the church of Terlano in Tyrol, with glazed roof tiles and a spire outside the nave. It was consecrated in 1887. Friedrich's last visit on June 6, 1888 was perpetuated by Theodor Fontane in his poem Kaiser Friedrich III. Letzte Fahrt.

Caputh and Geltow are connected by one of the busiest ferries of river Havel and by a railway bridge with a sidewalk,

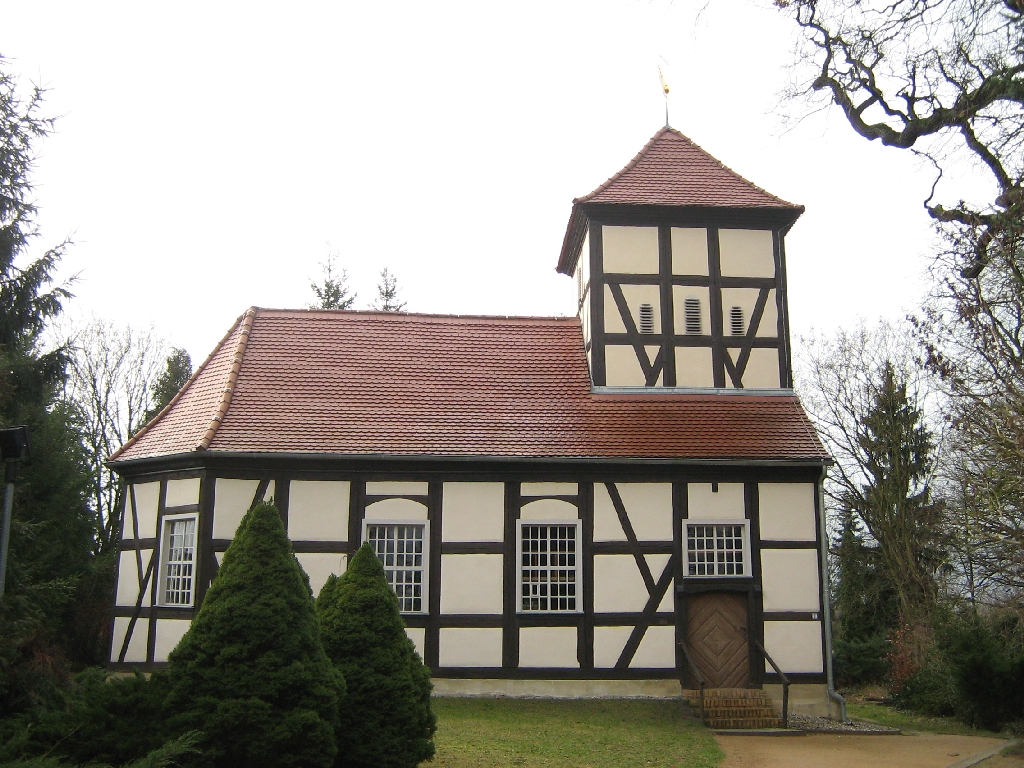
Church of the fishermens' village of Ferch

=== Ferch ===
The fishermen's village of Ferch on the southwestern end of lake Schwielowsee kept its rural character into the late 20th century. A colony of painters also settled there.

- The village church of Ferch was built in 1635. Galleries allow assemblies of a numerous congregation in the small building. The wooden barrel-vault has the structure of a boat.
Ferch

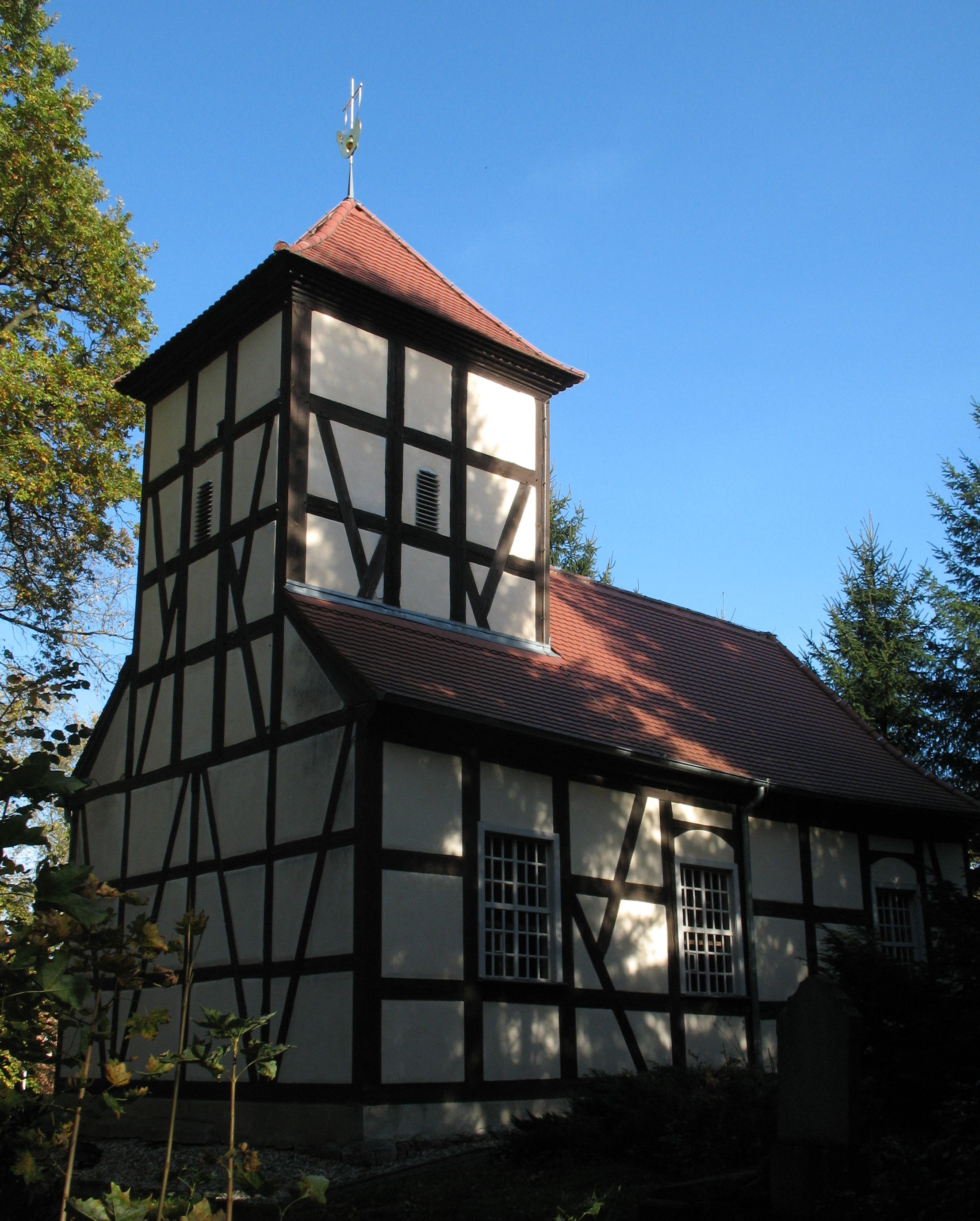
Fishermen's church

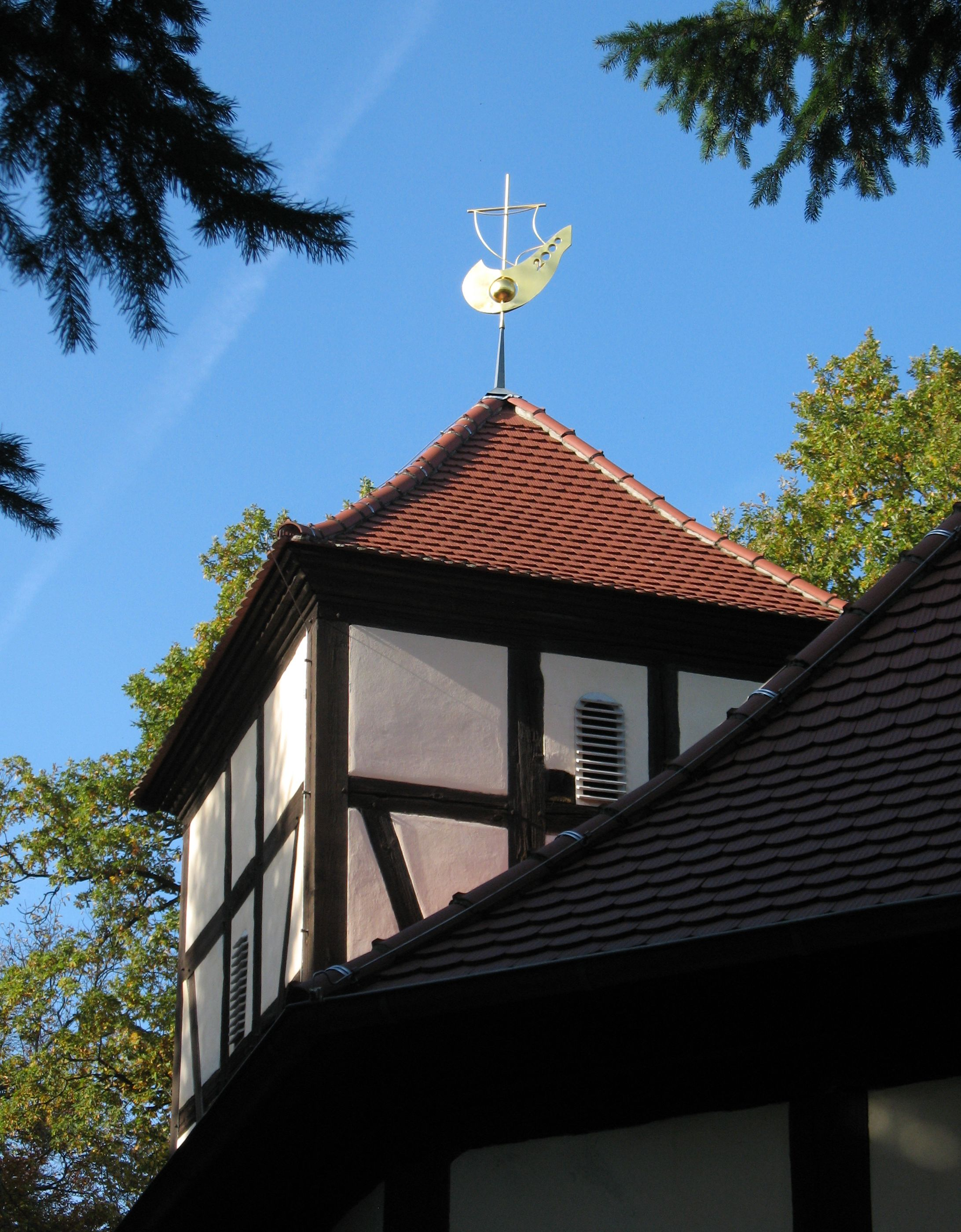
Steeple

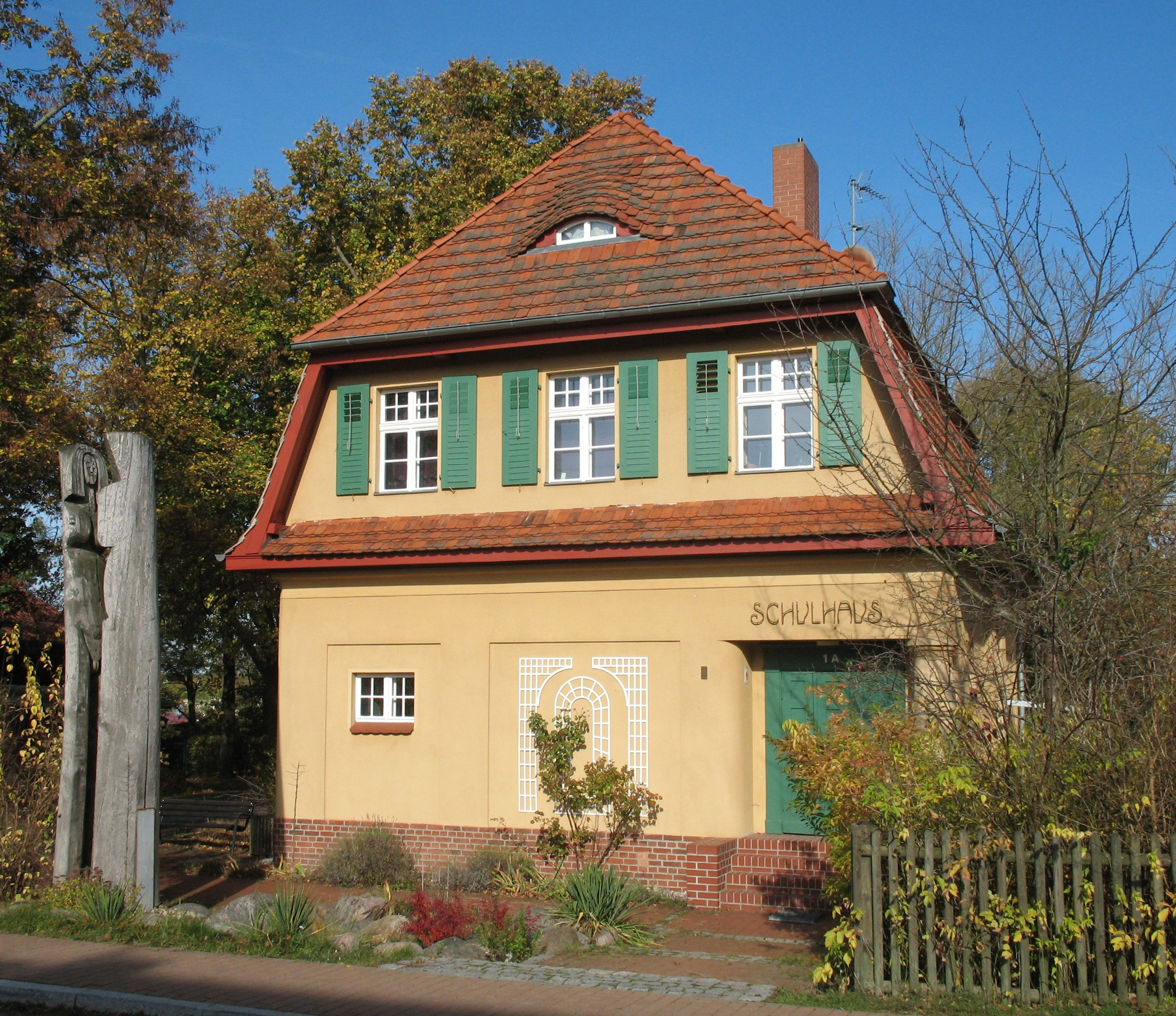
Former school building

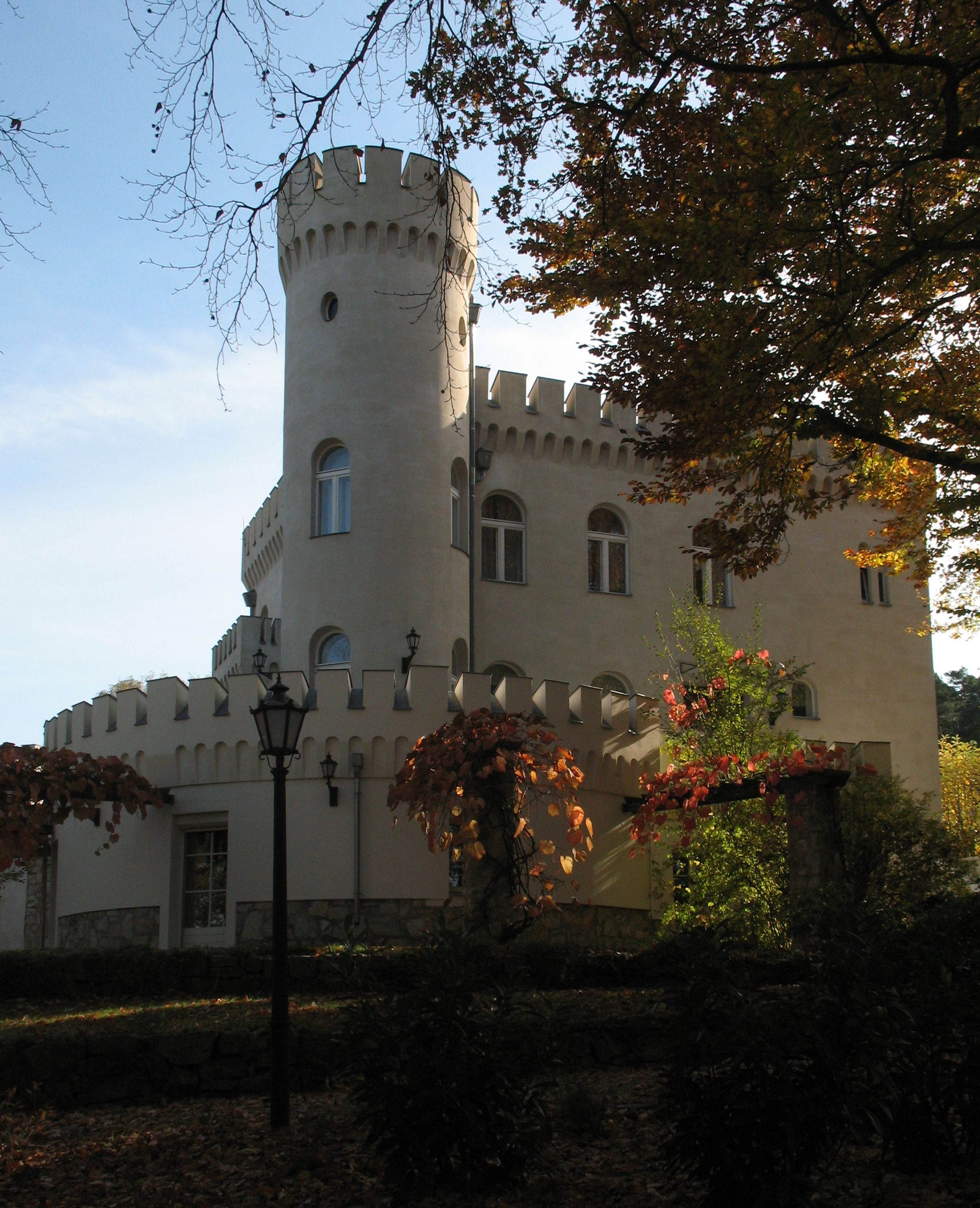
"Castle Ferch"
