= Caputh, Brandenburg =

Caputh
- Ortsteil of Schwielowsee
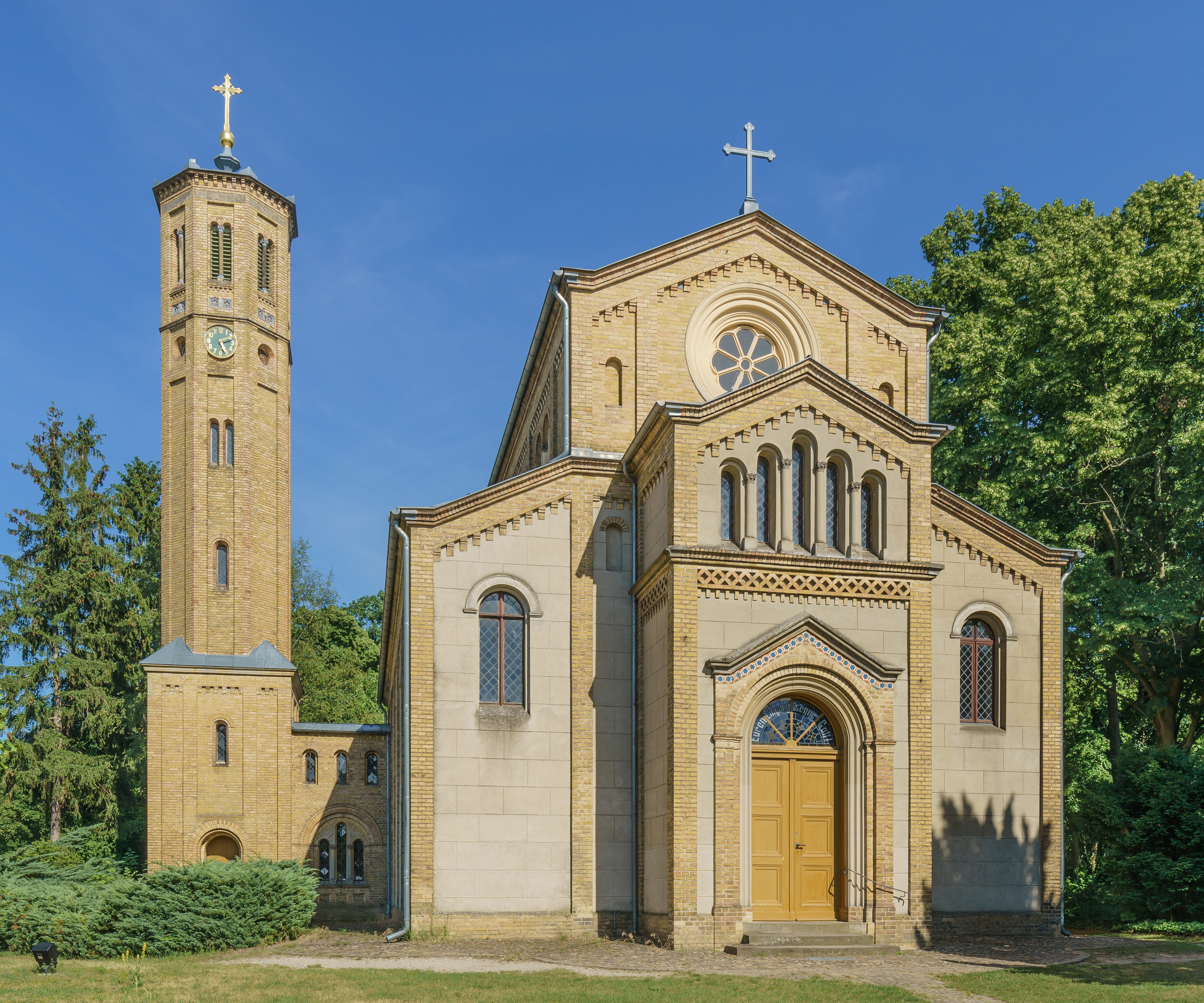
- Dorfkirche Caputh

- Coat of arms
- Interactive map of Caputh
- Location within Germany Location within Brandenburg
- Coordinates: 52°20′38″N 12°59′19″E
- Country: Germany
- State: Brandenburg
- District: Potsdam-Mittelmark
- Municipality: Schwielowsee

Area
  - Total: 12.46 km^{2} (4.81 sq mi)
- Elevation: 46 m (151 ft)

Population (2020-12-31)
  - Total: 4,816
  - Density: 386.5/km^{2} (1,001/sq mi)
- Time zone: UTC+01:00 (CET)
  - Summer (DST): UTC+02:00 (CEST)
- Postal codes: 14548
- Vehicle registration: PM

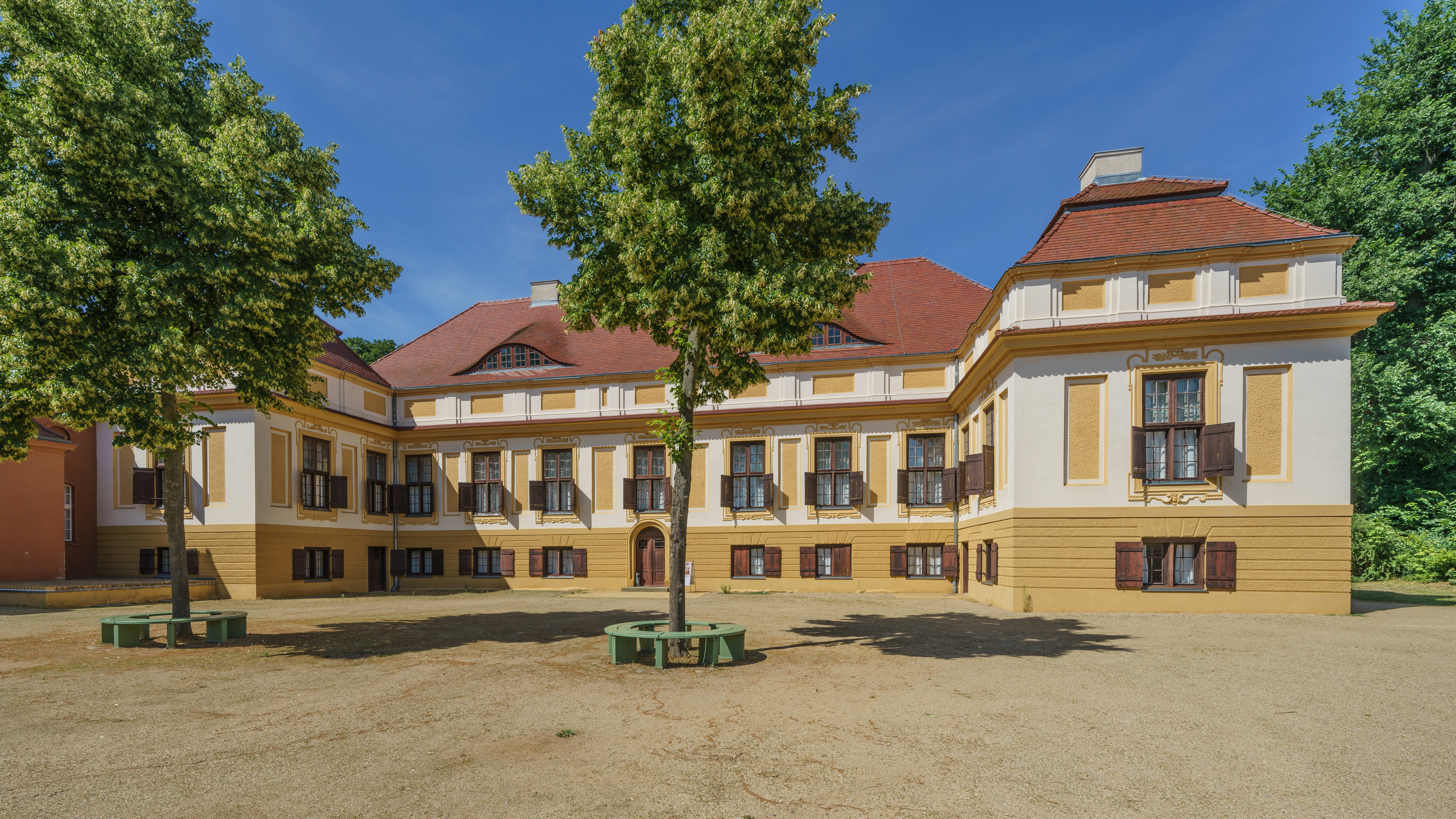
Caputh Palace

Einstein's summer house

Caputh (also known as Kaputh) is a village in the municipality of Schwielowsee, Potsdam-Mittelmark, Brandenburg, Germany.

Caputh got a railway station in 1904. Since the early 20th century it was seen as a remote residential area by wealthy urban people.

== Sights ==
The following sights are to be found:

- Caputh Palace, built in 1662 by Philip de Chiese, quartermaster general of Elector Frederick William of Brandenburg. In 1671 Frederick William gave the palace to his second wife Princess Dorothea Sophie of Schleswig-Holstein-Sonderburg-Glücksburg, who had it expanded and richly furnished with rich interior design, including valuable furniture and paintings. Notable is the Tile Hall (Fliesensaal) of 1720 with about 7,500 pieces of Delftware tiles, placed by order of King Frederick William I of Prussia. The park was designed by Peter Joseph Lenné in 1820. Today the palace is a museum of the Prussian Palaces and Gardens Foundation Berlin-Brandenburg.
- The Caputh village church is a work by Friedrich August Stüler. Built in a basilica form, it was consecrated in 1852 in the presence of King Frederick William IV of Prussia.
- Summer house of Albert Einstein in Caputh, built in 1929 and designed by Konrad Wachsmann. Einstein, though a non swimmer, was a passionate recreational sailor on the lake, but was only able to use his retreat until the Nazi takeover in 1933. After German reunification and the restitution to the Einstein family, the house is now a property of the Hebrew University of Jerusalem. The Einstein Forum, directed since 2000 by Susan Neiman, uses Einstein's summerhouse for conferences, workshops, and lectures.
- The exhibition Einsteins Sommer-Idyll in Caputh in the community centre (Bürgerhaus) Caputh is devoted to Albert Einstein and his summer house in Caputh. The wooden house, built in 1929 by the architect Konrad Wachsmann, is Einstein's only preserved residence in Germany. Its history is illustrated by numerous documents, photos and models. Furthermore, the work of Albert Einstein during his time in Berlin and Konrad Wachsmanns's path of life are recounted.

== Famous residents ==
- Albert Einstein - Physicist
- Norbert Glante - Politician
