= Hackescher Markt =

Public square in Berlin

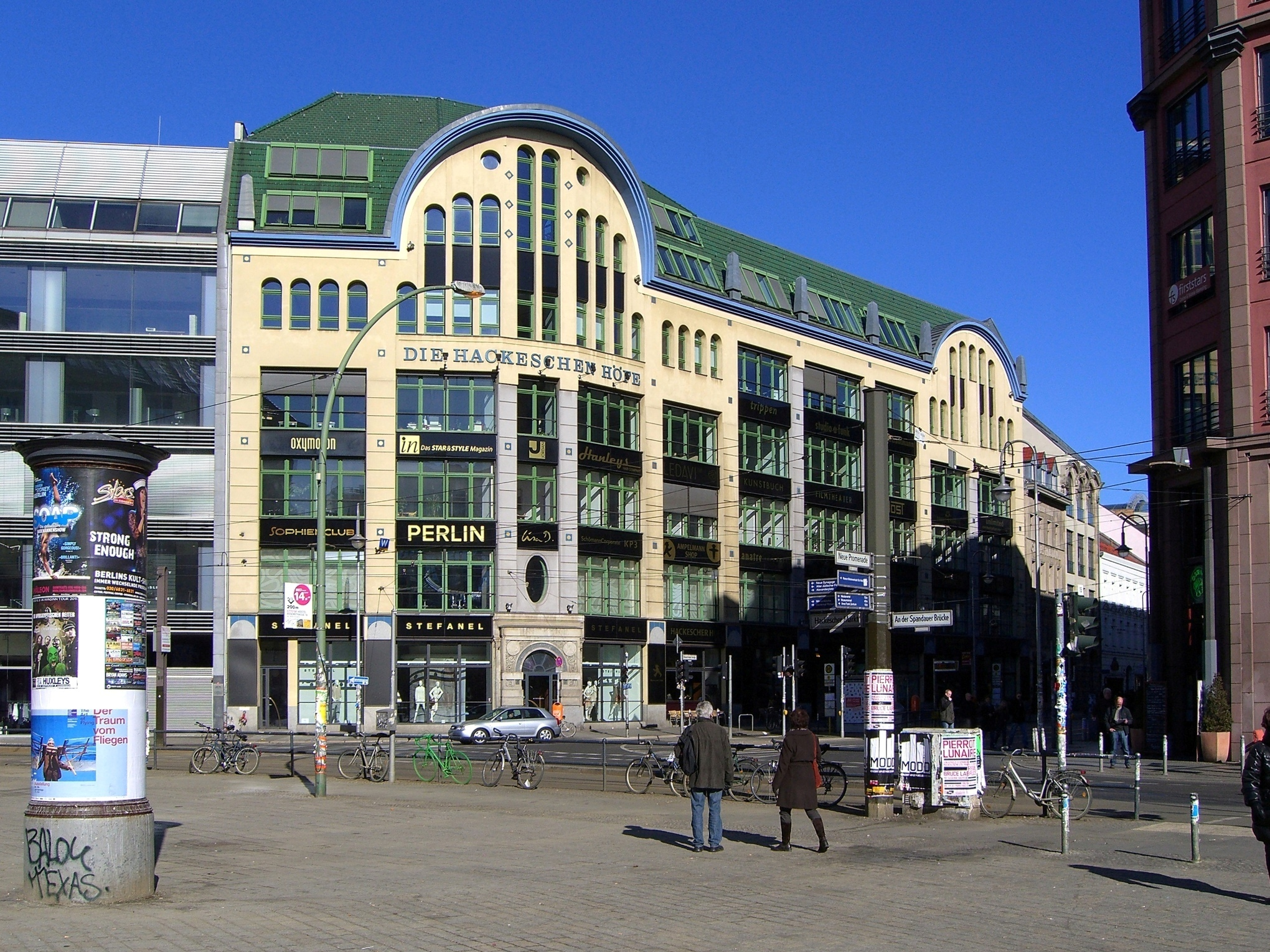
- Hackescher Markt with Hackesche Höfe
- Interactive map of Hackescher Markt
- Type: Public square
- Location: Berlin, Germany
- Quarter: Mitte
- Nearest metro station: Hackescher Markt
- Coordinates: 52°31′24″N 13°24′10″E
- Major junctions: Oranienburger Straße; Große Präsidentenstraße; Neue Promenade; Henriette-Herz-Platz; An der Spandauer Brücke; Dircksenstraße; Rosenthaler Straße

Hackescher Markt ("Hacke's Market") is a square in the central Mitte locality of Berlin, Germany, situated at the eastern end of Oranienburger Strasse. It is an important transport hub and a starting point for the city's nightlife.

== Overview ==
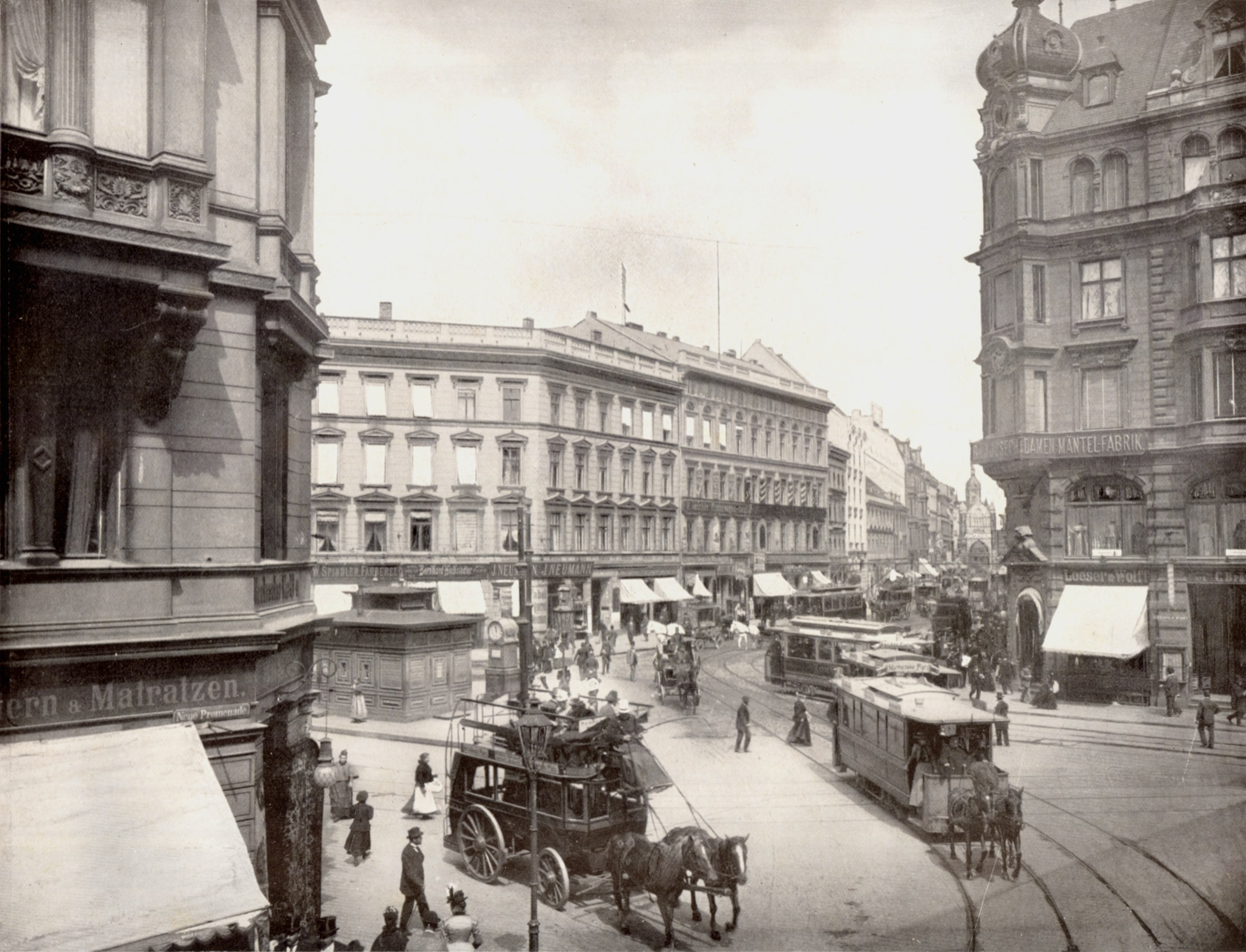
Hackescher Markt about 1900

Originally a marsh north of the city fortifications on the road to Spandau, the Prussian king Frederick the Great about 1750 had a market square laid out under the surveillance of Townmajor Hans Christoph Friedrich Graf von Hacke in the course of a northern town expansion. It was officially named after Hacke on 23 July 1840.

In 1882 the area received access to the Berlin Stadtbahn railway line at Berlin Hackescher Markt station, then called Börse after the nearby stock exchange. The station was renamed Marx-Engels-Platz during the GDR era. The railway tracks of the S-Bahn along the eastern and northern sections of Mitte between the stations Hackescher Markt and Jannowitzbrücke are built where the ramparts, walls, moats and glacis of the Berlin Fortress, a 17th century bastion fort around the historic city limits, had been.

Formerly a rather neglected area, Hackescher Markt with its old buildings has developed into a cultural and commercial centre after German reunification, famous for its nightlife centered on the Hackesche Höfe courtyard ensemble. The square is also served by several tramway and night bus lines. A weekly market is still held every Thursday and Saturday.
