= Berlin Hackescher Markt station =

Berlin S-Bahn Station

Coordinates: 52.523°N 13.402°E

Hackescher Markt
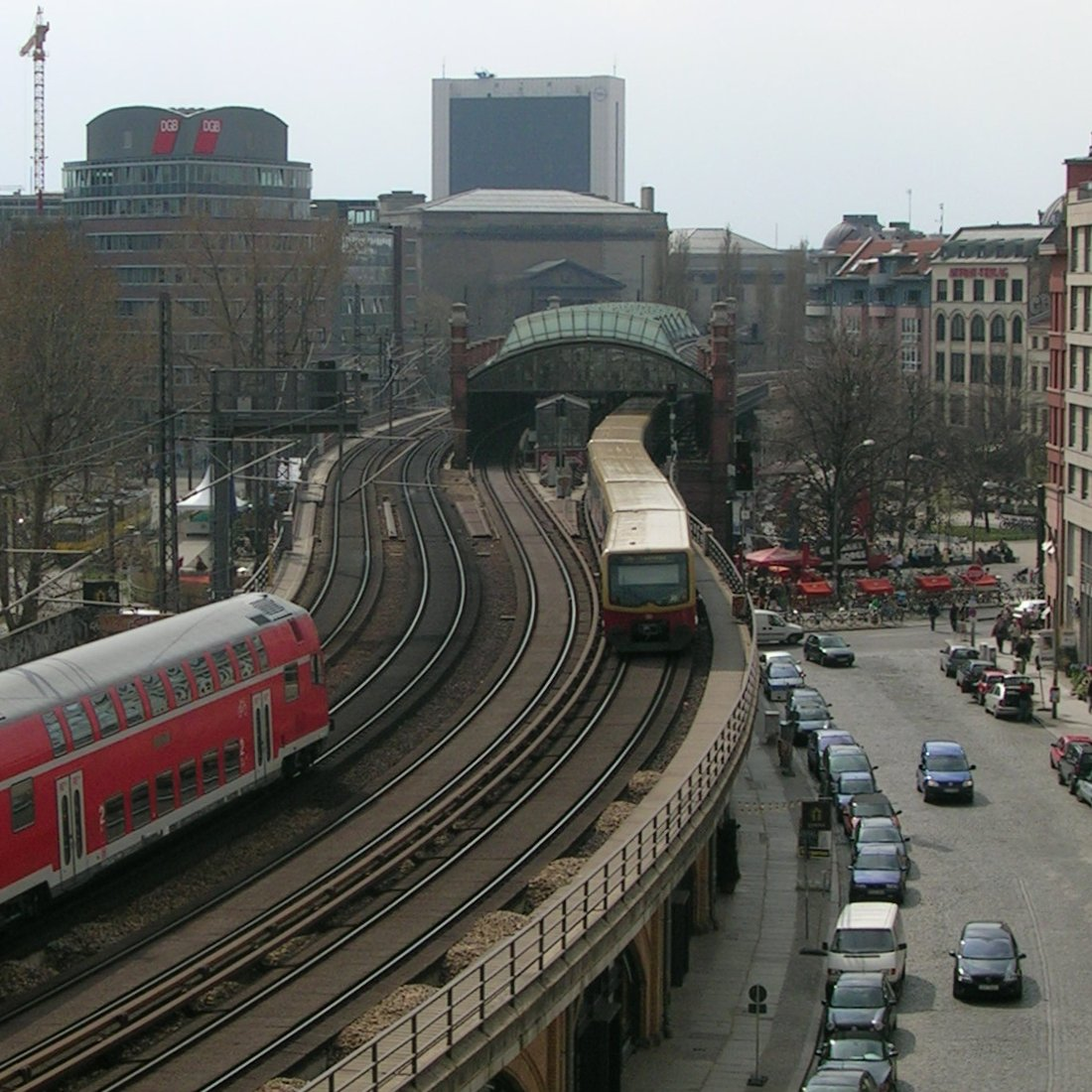
- Hackescher Markt station, with S-Bahn tracks to the right and through main line tracks to the left.

General information
- Location: Am Zwirngraben; 10178 Berlin; Mitte, Berlin, Berlin; Germany
- Owner: DB Netz
- Operator: DB Station&Service
- Line: Berlin Stadtbahn
- Platforms: 1
- Tracks: 2
- Train operators: S-Bahn Berlin
- Connections: S3 S5 S7 S9

Other information
- Station code: 2447
- DS100 code: BHKM
- Category: 4
- Fare zone: : Berlin A/5555
- Website: www.bahnhof.de

Services
Preceding station	Berlin S-Bahn	Following station
Friedrichstraße towards Spandau	S3	Alexanderplatz towards Erkner
Friedrichstraße towards Westkreuz	S5	Alexanderplatz towards Strausberg Nord
Friedrichstraße towards Potsdam Hbf	S7	Alexanderplatz towards Ahrensfelde
Friedrichstraße towards Spandau	S9	Alexanderplatz towards BER Airport
Location

Berlin Hackescher Markt is a railway station in the Mitte district of Berlin, Germany. It is named after the adjacent Hackescher Markt square.

== Overview ==
The station is located on the elevated Berlin Stadtbahn line, which crosses central Berlin from east to west. The Stadtbahn carries local S-Bahn services on one pair of tracks, and longer distance services on another pair. Hackescher Markt station is served by S-Bahn lines S3, S5, S7 and S9. Longer distance services pass the station without stopping.

The station opened in 1882 and was originally named Börse (stock exchange) and then Marx-Engels-Platz during the GDR era. In 1992 it received the name Hackescher Markt from the adjacent square. Following the demolition of the Lehrter Stadtbahnhof (architecturally similar and previously listed), with Bellevue it is now one of only two Stadtbahn stations preserved in their original condition.

As well as its rail connections, the station is also served by four tram lines, two of which run continuously. There are no bus services serving the station during the day, but is one of two main hubs in Berlin's night bus network. At night, six bus lines serve the station and there are guaranteed connections between many of these and the tram lines running at this time.

== Station layout ==
Tracks	Line	Destination
3	S3	for Ostbahnhof, Ostkreuz, Erkner
3	S5	for Ostbahnhof, Ostkreuz, Strausberg Nord
3	S7	for Ostbahnhof, Ostkreuz, Ahrensfelde
3	S9	for Ostbahnhof, Schöneweide, Berlin Brandenburg Airport
4	S3	for Hauptbahnhof(Central Station), Zoologischer Garten, Spandau
4	S5	for Hauptbahnhof(Central Station), Zoologischer Garten, Westkreuz
4	S7	for Hauptbahnhof(Central Station), Zoologischer Garten, Potsdam Hbf
4	S9	for Hauptbahnhof(Central Station), Zoologischer Garten, Spandau

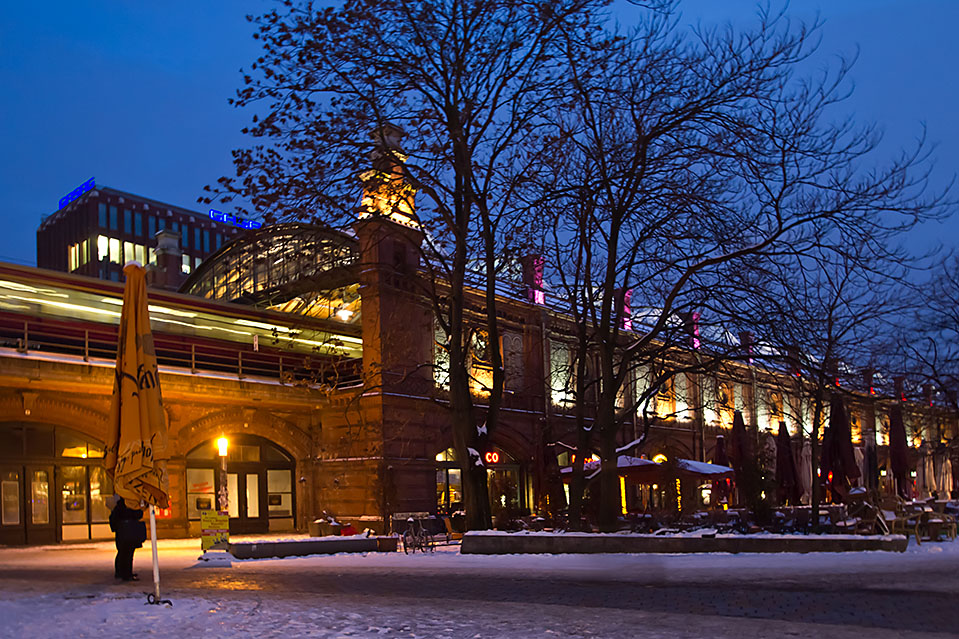
S-Bahn station Hackescher Markt nordside
