= Berlin Friedrichstraße station =

Railway station in Berlin

Berlin Friedrichstraße
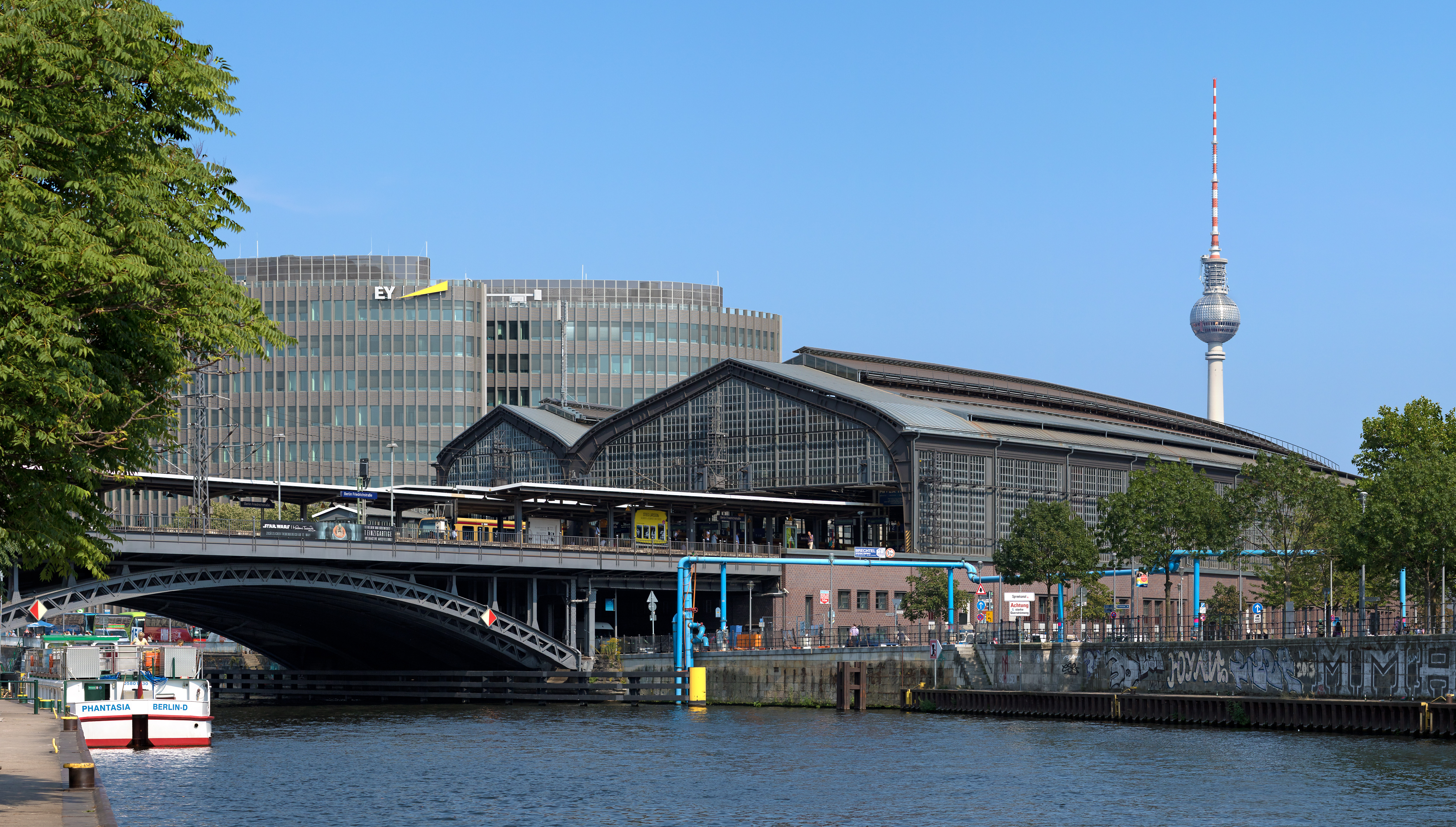

General information
- Location: Friedrichstraße/Georgenstraße; Mitte, Berlin; Germany
- Coordinates: 52°31′13″N 13°23′13″E
- Owner: Deutsche Bahn
- Operator: DB Station&Service
- Lines: Stadtbahn; North-South tunnel; U6
- Platforms: 4 island platforms
- Tracks: 8
- Connections: 147 N6

Construction
- Accessible: Yes

Other information
- Station code: 527
- DS100 code: BFRI
- IBNR: 8011306
- Category: 2
- Fare zone: : Berlin A/5555
- Website: www.bahnhof.de

History
- Opened: 7 February 1882; 144 years ago

Passengers
- 2018: 220,000
Services
Preceding station	DB Regio Nordost	Following station
Berlin Hbf towards Berlin Charlottenburg	Flughafen-Express limited service	Berlin Alexanderplatz towards BER Airport
Berlin Hbf towards Dessau Hbf	RE 7	Berlin Alexanderplatz towards Senftenberg
Berlin Hbf towards Nauen	RB 14	Berlin Alexanderplatz towards Berlin Ostbahnhof
Berlin Hbf towards Golm	RB 23	Berlin Alexanderplatz towards Berlin Ostbahnhof
Preceding station	Abellio Rail Mitteldeutschland	Following station
Berlin Hbf towards Thale Hbf or Goslar	Harz-Berlin-Express	Berlin Alexanderplatz towards Berlin Ostbahnhof
Preceding station	Ostdeutsche Eisenbahn	Following station
Berlin Hbf towards Brandenburg Hbf or Magdeburg Hbf	RE 1	Berlin Alexanderplatz towards Cottbus Hbf or Frankfurt (Oder)
Berlin Hbf towards Nauen	RE 2	Berlin Alexanderplatz towards Cottbus Hbf
Preceding station	Berlin S-Bahn	Following station
Oranienburger Straße towards Oranienburg	S1	Brandenburger Tor towards Wannsee
Oranienburger Straße towards Bernau	S2	Brandenburger Tor towards Blankenfelde
Oranienburger Straße towards Hennigsdorf	S25	Brandenburger Tor towards Teltow Stadt
Oranienburger Straße towards Blankenburg	S26	Brandenburger Tor towards Teltow Stadt
Berlin Hbf towards Spandau	S3	Hackescher Markt towards Erkner
Berlin Hbf towards Westkreuz	S5	Hackescher Markt towards Strausberg Nord
Berlin Hbf towards Potsdam Hbf	S7	Hackescher Markt towards Ahrensfelde
Berlin Hbf towards Spandau	S9	Hackescher Markt towards BER Airport
Preceding station	Berlin U-Bahn	Following station
Oranienburger Tor towards Alt-Tegel	U6	Unter den Linden towards Alt-Mariendorf
Location

Berlin Friedrichstraße (German: [bɛʁˌliːn ˈfʁiːdʁɪçˌʃtʁaːsə]) is a railway station in the German capital Berlin. It is located on the Friedrichstraße, a major north-south street in the Mitte district of Berlin, adjacent to the point where the street crosses the river Spree. Underneath the station is the U-Bahn station Friedrichstraße.

Due to its central location in Berlin and its proximity to attractions such as the Unter den Linden boulevard, the Brandenburg Gate and the Reichstag, the station is a favorite destination for tourists. At the same time, it is the main junction for regional traffic in Berlin, measured by the number of passengers. It is open 24/7.

During the Cold War, Friedrichstraße became famous for being a station that was located entirely in East Berlin, yet continued to be served by S-Bahn and U-Bahn trains from West Berlin, as well as long-distance trains from countries west of the Iron Curtain. The station was also a major border crossing between East and West Berlin.

== History ==
=== The original station ===
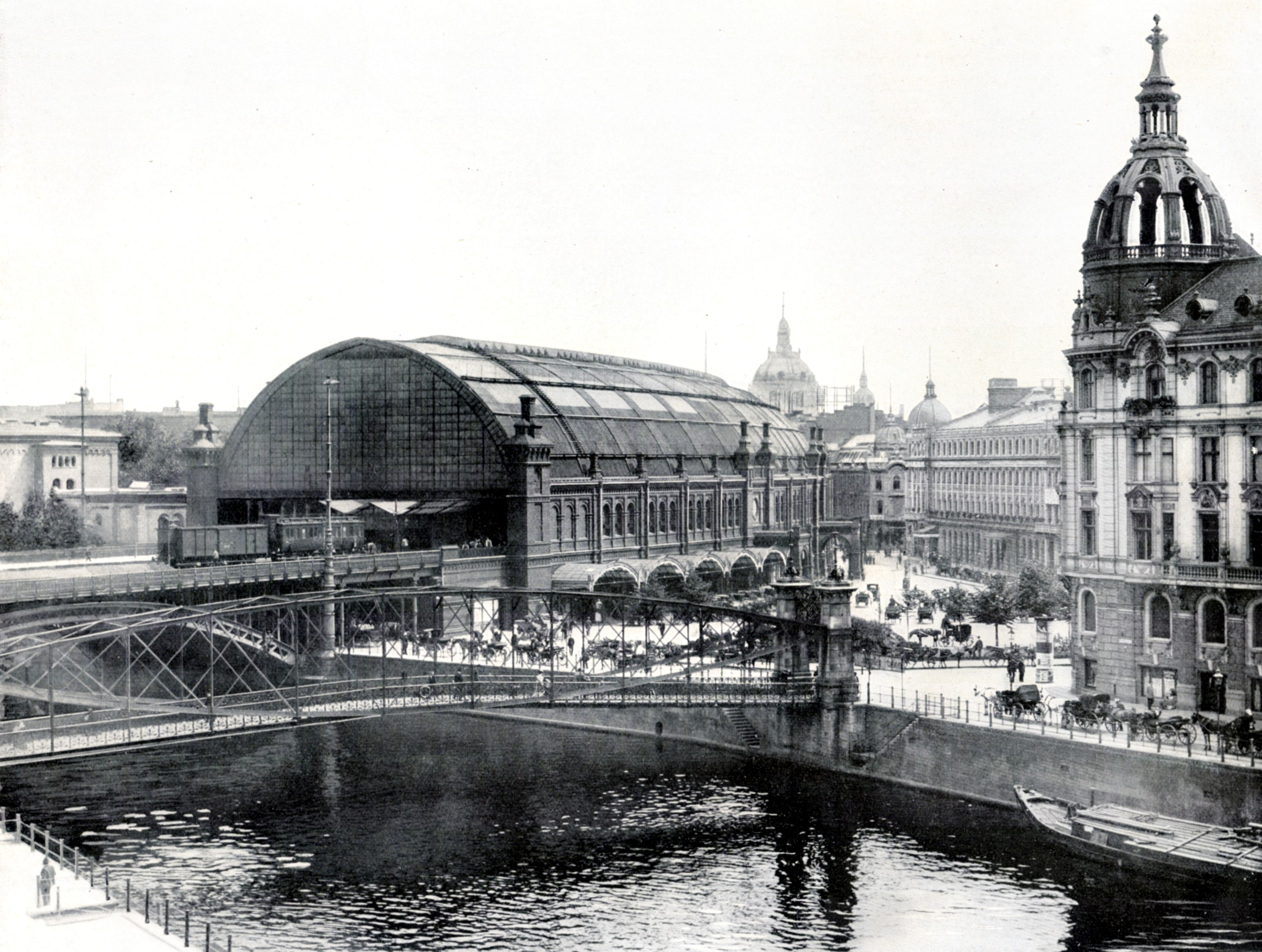
The first Friedrichstraße station in 1900; view from the west across the river Spree

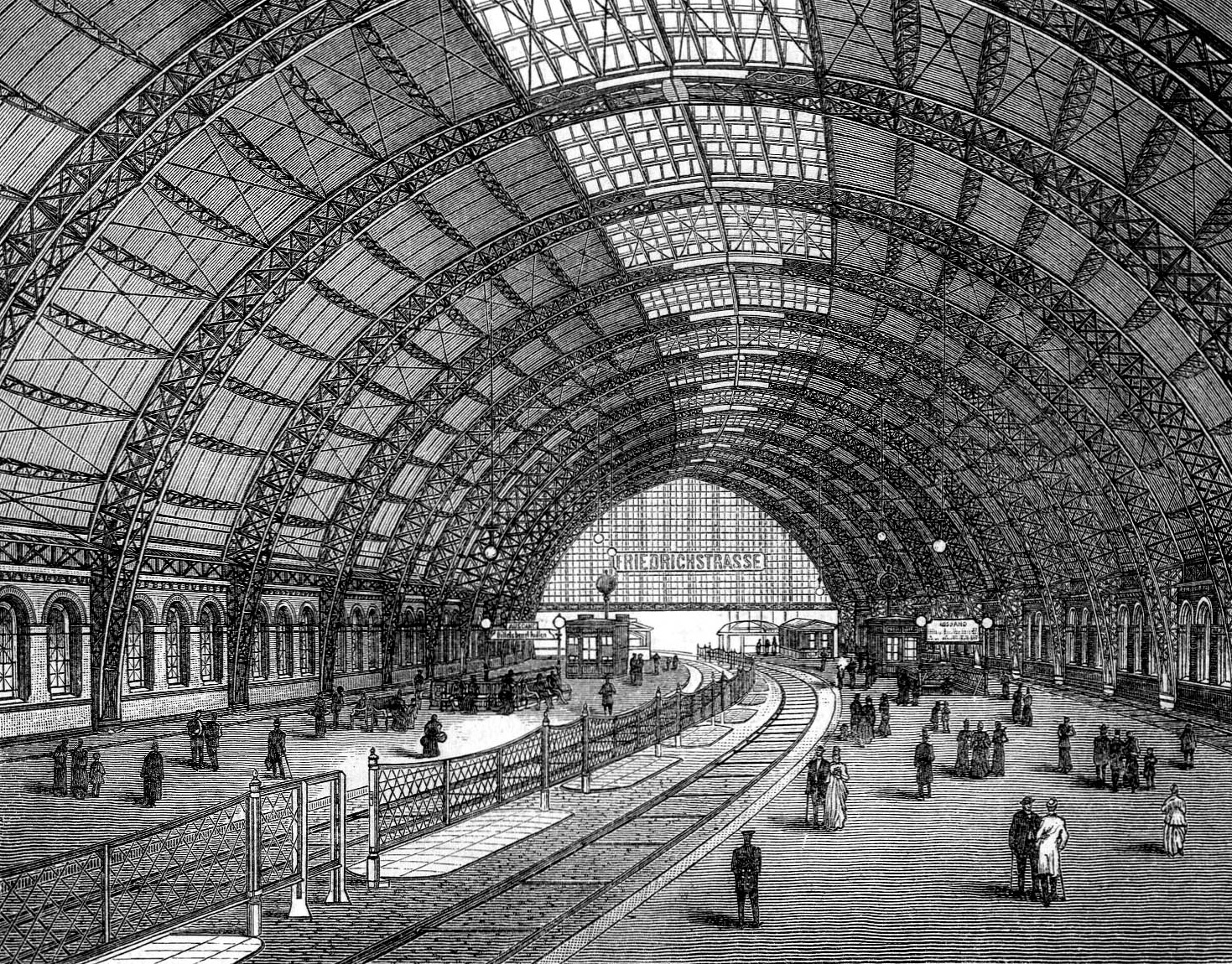
The train shed of the first station; engraving after the original architectural drawing published in 1885

In 1878, the first station was built after plans by Johannes Vollmer between the Friedrichstraße and the river Spree as part of the Berlin Stadtbahn construction. The architect was working on the neighbouring Hackescher Markt station at the same time. Just as the elevated viaduct the station is integrated into, the station rests on large arches built with masonry. The station had two platforms each with two tracks, covered by a large, curved train shed which rested on steel trusses of different lengths to cover the curvature of the viaduct underneath. The main entrance was on the northern side, the pick-up point for horse carriages on the south side. The station was officially opened on 7 February 1882, as part of the ceremonial opening of the Berlin Stadtbahn. Long-distance trains began running on 15 May the same year.

=== Extensions and remodeling ===
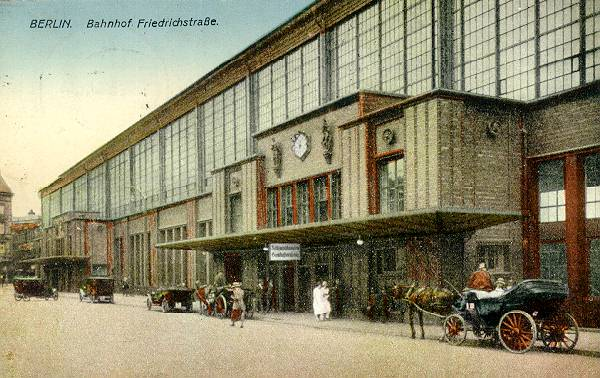
The north side of the remodeled station in 1926

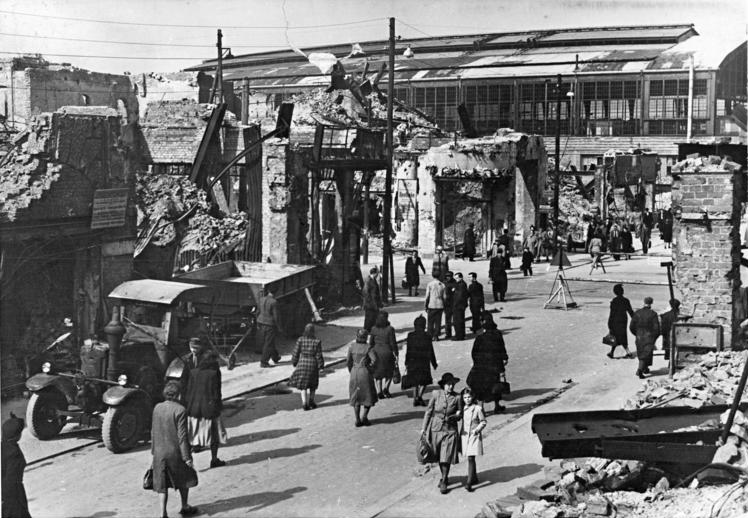
Destruction around the station after World War II

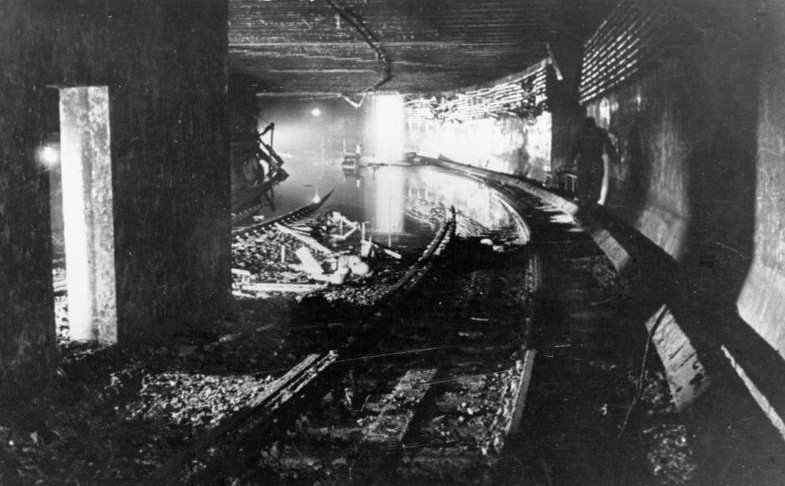
Flooded S-Bahn tunnel under the Friedrichstraße station

Due to the large amounts of traffic passing through the station even before World War I, plans were made in 1914 to extend the station. There was a new, slightly elevated platform on the northern side for the S-Bahn, and the existing platforms had been made slightly narrower, leaving one platform for the S-Bahn, and two platforms for long-distance trains. The steel-truss, double-arched train shed was built between 1919 and 1925, featuring large glass fronts. On the northern side of the building, two entry halls in expressionist style were built, and the whole northern side was covered by characteristic dark tiles. The southern façade was only plastered until the last renovation in 1999, when it was also covered by tiles.

In 1923, the Friedrichstraße underground station for line C (today's U6 and southeastern U7) was finished, creating the first part of the underground maze the station still has today.

At the beginning of the 1930s, construction began again at the Friedrichstraße station, as the North-South tunnel of the S-Bahn was driven under the station. A long pedestrian tunnel connected to the underground station of the same name Berlin U-Bahn was also driven under the northern end of the station, and that underground station received the characteristic yellow tiles still featured today. On 27 July 1936, just before the 1936 Summer Olympics, the underground S-Bahn station was opened.

After the events of "Kristallnacht", starting on 1 December 1938, thousands of Jewish children started from or passed through the station to leave Germany as part of the Refugee Children Movement.

The station was bombed by the Polish sabotage and diversionary squad "Zagra-Lin" in early 1943, with 14 people dead and 27 wounded.

The station escaped major damage during the bombing of Berlin in World War II. The U-Bahn and S-Bahn ceased operations on 23 and 25 April 1945, respectively, due to electricity power cuts. During the morning of 2 May 1945, the day the Berlin garrison surrendered to the Soviet Red Army, a detonation in the North-South tunnel under the Landwehrkanal caused the flooding of the tunnel, including Friedrichstraße's below-ground S-Bahn station, along with a large part of the Berlin underground system via the connecting tunnel between the S-Bahn and the Berlin U-Bahn at their respective Friedrichstraße stations. (Note: See History of the Berlin U-Bahn#World War II)

Reconstruction started in 1945. Trains first returned to the facilities above ground. By the end of May and early June 1945 the BVG, the operator of Berlin's U-Bahn, had sealed up the pedestrian tunnel between the tunnel of the S-Bahn and U-Bahn stations to stop water flooding into the tunnel. Reichsbahn, the operator of the S-Bahn, declared that it lacked the means to plug the tunnel leaks. On 4 June 1945, BVG started to drain the underground system of water ingress. On 12 July 1945, the underground reopened at Friedrichstraße station for two one-track shuttle operations, one from the north and one from the south meeting there, and regular two-track traffic restarted on 5 December 1945. Reichsbahn drained its North-South tunnel only later and restarted below-ground S-Bahn services on 2 June 1946. On 1 December 1946, the North-South tunnel and Friedrichstraße below-ground S-Bahn station shut again for an extensive refurbishment which lasted until 16 October 1947, when the North-South tunnel was again fully operational.

=== Border crossing during the Cold War ===
Friedrichstraße was the only East Berlin station open during the Cold War (for border crossings) on the three rapid transit lines (two underground and one S-Bahn) that ran from West Berlin into East Berlin and back into West Berlin again. The other stations became known as 'ghost stations'.

Floorplan of Friedrichstraße station and the access and border crossing zones within. Traffic into East Berlin is marked pink, traffic into West Berlin marked cyan, areas accessible to West Berliners are marked green, and areas accessible to East German citizens are marked brown. Areas marked in red were sealed off to prevent Republikflucht

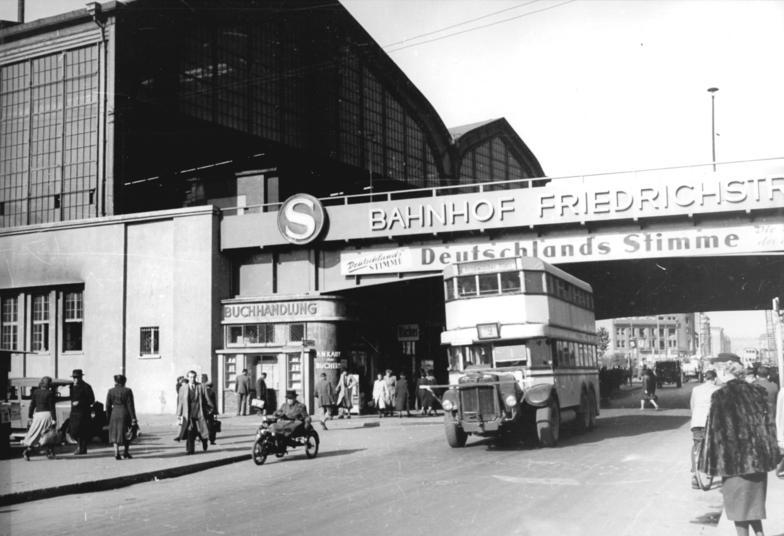
The station in the early 1950s

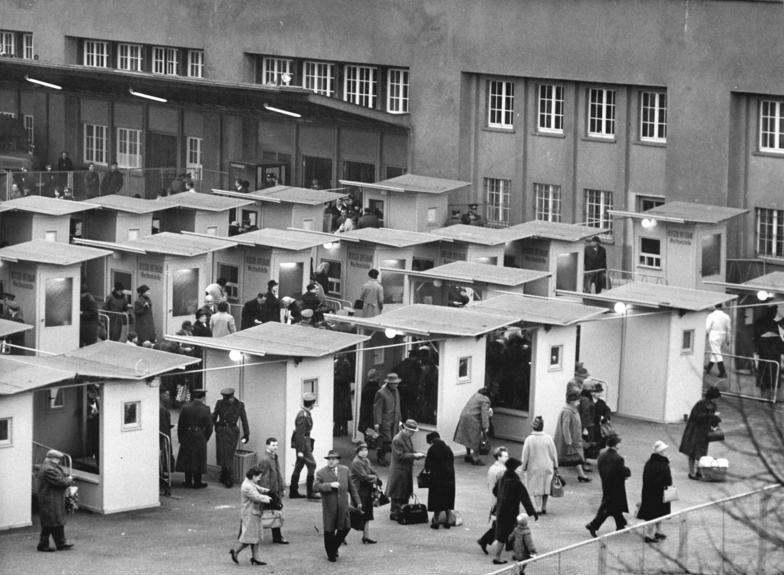
Border crossing at the station in 1964

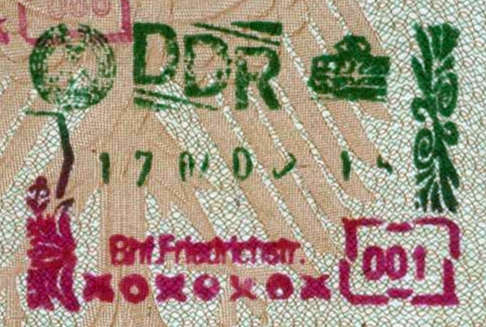
Passport stamp of the border crossing Friedrichstraße

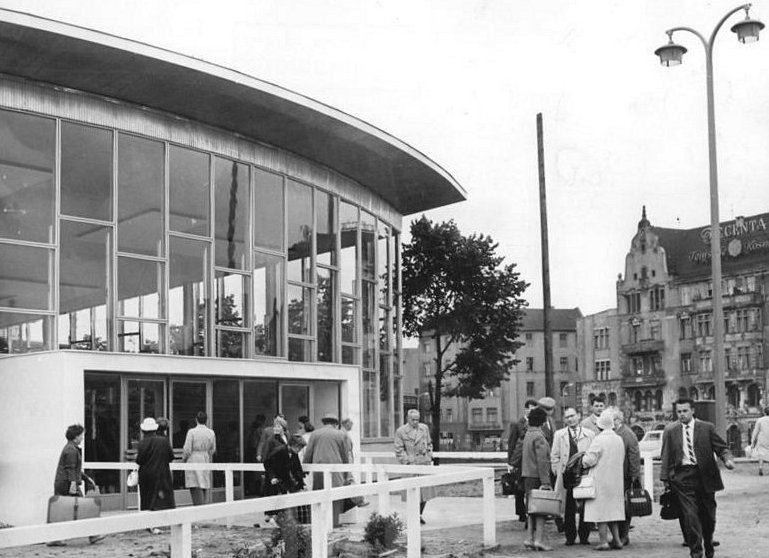
The outside of the Tränenpalast or "Palace of Tears" where many goodbyes were said when people left for West Berlin or for other places in the West.

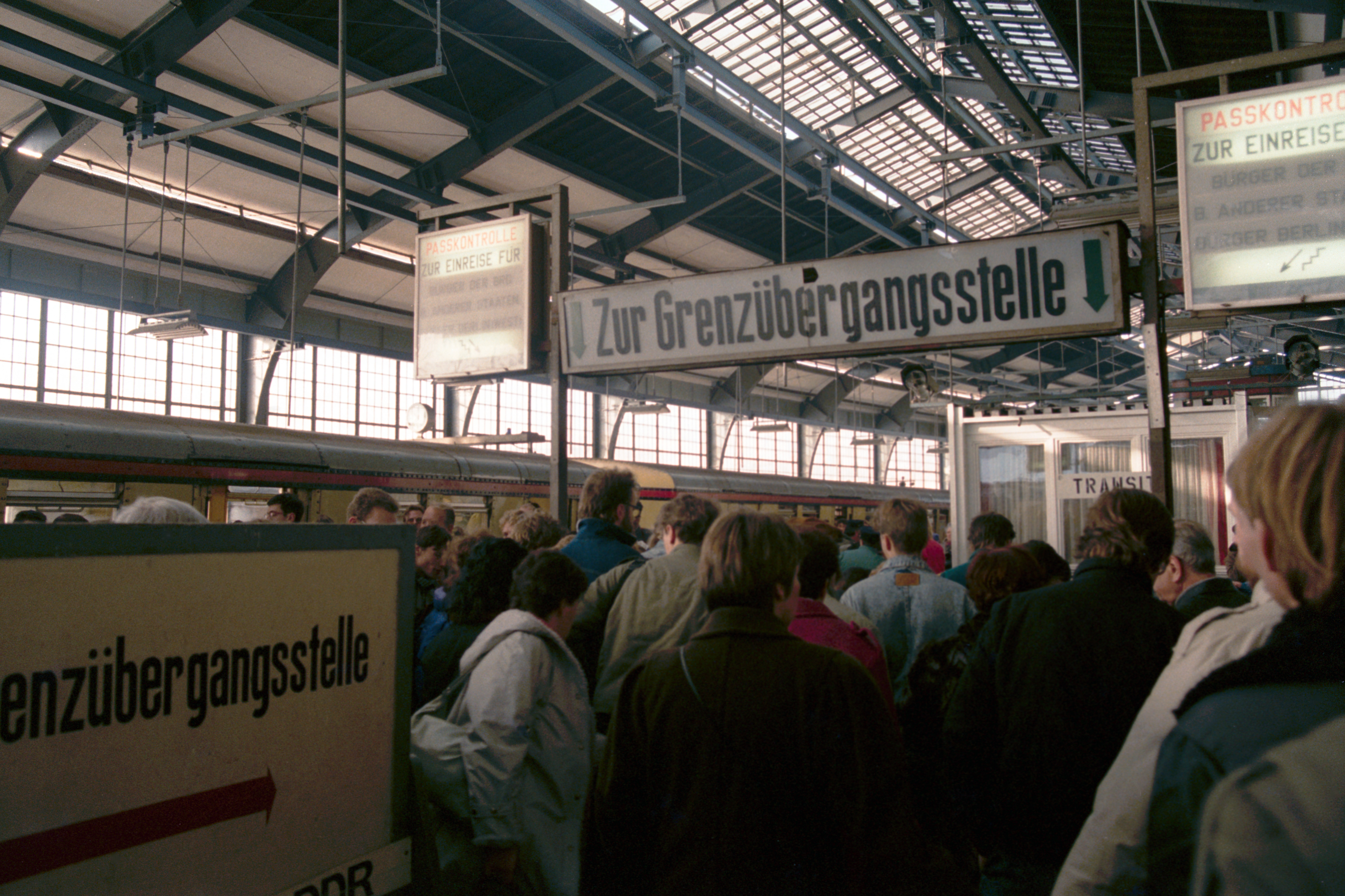
Platform B (S-Bahn to the West), November 1989

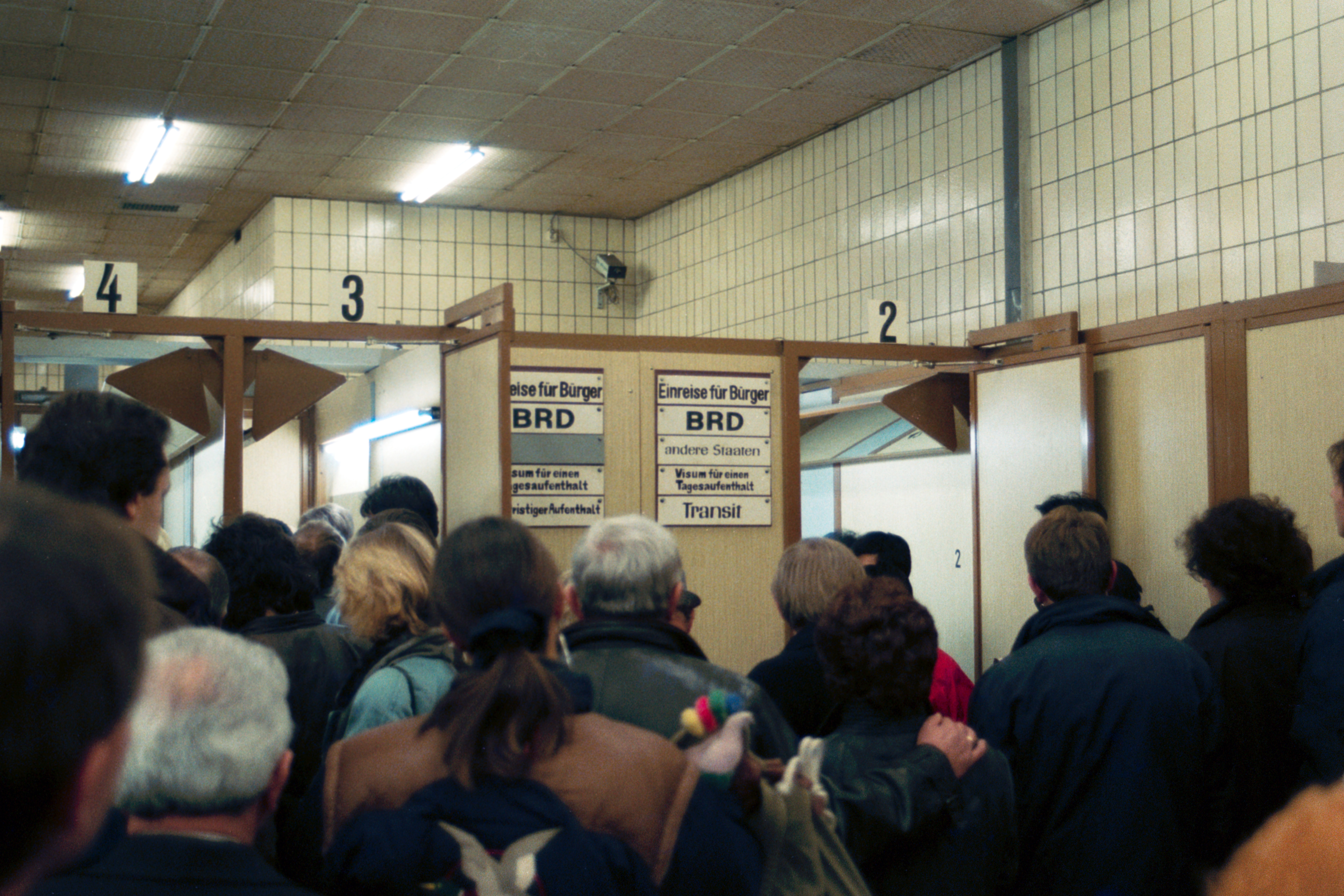
DDR Passport Control November 1989

During the onset of the Cold War and its tensions between the Western and the Soviet-occupied sectors of Berlin, the Friedrichstraße station played an important role for citizens of Berlin to reach their friends and relatives in other sectors of Berlin. At the end of 1946, the Soviet Military Administration in Germany had created an East German border police force, tasked with preventing Republikflucht (escape from the East German republic). With the erection of the Inner German border in 1952, East Germany was to a large extent sealed off from the west. However, Berlin, and in particular the public transport system that criss-crossed between the western Allied and Soviet sectors, was still a hole in that Iron Curtain. Accordingly, Berlin became the main route by which East Germans left for the West. The 3.5 million East Germans that had left by 1961 amounted to approximately 20% of the entire East German population, many using the Friedrichstraße station with its bustling traffic as the starting point for their escape. During the East German uprising of 1953, the East German Deutsche Reichsbahn stopped S-Bahn transport between 17 June and 9 July 1953.

When the East German government erected the Berlin Wall on 13 August 1961, it also severed the U-Bahn, S-Bahn and long-distance train connections passing through Berlin. The district of Berlin-Mitte, where the Friedrichstraße station is located, was surrounded in the northerly, westerly, and southerly directions by the Western Sectors: For the S-Bahn at the Friedrichstraße station, the next station to the west was across the wall in West Berlin, to the north were three more stops in the Soviet sector, and only two to the south. The situation was similar for the U6 metro underneath the Friedrichstraße, which had three stations to the north and two stations to the south before crossing the wall.

Therefore, despite being wholly located in East Berlin, all of the station's underground facilities, namely the S-Bahn platform of the North-South tunnel and the underground station, were only accessible for passengers from the western sectors as a transfer station, or to access the border crossing at ground level.

The facilities above ground, on the arches of the Stadtbahn, were separated along the platforms:

- Platform A was used for long-distance trains. This included the so-called Interzonenzüge, trains running non-stop from Berlin through East German territory to West Germany. For those trains, the Friedrichstraße station was a terminus. This platform was also a stop for trains with international destinations such as Copenhagen, Stockholm (using the ferry connection between Sassnitz and Trelleborg), Zürich, Vienna, and the legendary Paris - Moscow express. The latter could not be boarded by East German passengers at this station; they could only board the train at its next stop, Berlin Ostbahnhof.
- Platform B became the terminus for the Stadtbahn arriving from West Berlin to and from Wannsee and Staaken. Passengers were able to transfer to the underground lines of the S-Bahn and the U-Bahn, or to long-distance trains without entering East Germany.
- Platform C in the smaller train shed on the north side was used by traffic going to East Berlin and East Germany, which now became the terminus for the Stadtbahn lines to Erkner, Königs Wusterhausen, Strausberg Nord, Ahrensfelde, Wartenberg, and to the Berlin-Schönefeld airport.

Between platforms B and C was a metal-glass barrier that practically fulfilled the same function as the Berlin Wall: East German border troops separated the station into two completely isolated areas, both fully under armed control, one for people within East Berlin and the other for transit travellers, persons switching between the different westbound train lines, and the few Easterners with a hard-to-obtain exit visa, all within one station building with a maze of connecting hallways, barriers, numerous cameras, armed guards with sniffer dogs, plain-clothes agents, and a loggia under the roof for surveillance by armed border patrol and Stasi officers.

Tracks between the western and eastern systems were, aside from the long-distance tracks, completely separated. S-Bahn trains using the heavily guarded passing track west of platform C required permission from the commander of the border guard detail. An exchange of rolling stock between the divided S-Bahn segments of Berlin was only possible via the long-distance tracks on platform A. These tracks were equipped with derailers to prevent escape attempts.

At ground level, between the elevated and the underground parts of the station, were facilities for crossing into East Berlin. This included three individual passport checks, a customs control, waiting rooms (since the crossing could take anywhere from 15 minutes to several hours), interrogation rooms, holding cells, offices to register and record people crossing the border, and a counter for visa fees and the (mandatory) currency exchange.

Due to its location in central Berlin, with its many shops, offices, official buildings, embassies, hotels, as well as cultural and entertainment (Friedrichstadtpalast, Metropol theatre house, opera house, Museum Island), as well as being a border checkpoint, the volume of traffic in the station was enormous. In the beginning after the wall was built, both eastbound and westbound border traffic was controlled at ground level. These rather constrained circumstances, compounded by the traffic in and around the station, led to the construction of a building on the square north of the station, which was connected to the main station. This new building was used for westbound border crossings, with separate checkpoints for West Berliners, West Germans, foreigners and diplomats, transit travelers, and the small number of East Germans with exit visas. On the door was a guard station to separate people permitted to cross the border from those who were ineligible, leading to many tearful goodbyes in front of the building. This gave the building the moniker Tränenpalast ("Palace of Tears").

On the southern side of the station building was the so-called "service entrance" (Diensteingang) for personnel of the Deutsche Reichsbahn (the East German national railways). This entry led through its own control room and then, via several corridors, to a door on the ground floor of the "western" side. The entry was used to infiltrate and exfiltrate agents of the East German intelligence service, and to allow members of the West German communist party and West Berlin socialist party to pass without being checked or recorded. This secret pathway between the two cold war fronts was also the escape route for some members of the West German terror organization Red Army Faction to avoid arrest in West Germany. On 7 July 1976 the officially-wanted Movement 2 June members Inge Viett, Monika Berberich, Gabrielle Rollnick, and Juliane Plambeck escaped following their escape from prison, and on 27 May 1978 Till Meyer escaped into East Germany via Friedrichstraße station, though they did not stay there. Viett later escaped to East Germany again and stayed there until the fall of the Berlin Wall. In the opposite direction, on 18 January 1979, the East German double agent Werner Stiller used this route to escape to the West.

The railway station held another attraction during the Cold War. The ground level and the underground platforms on the "western" side of the station had so-called Intershops, created specifically for travelers from West Berlin who did not want to pass through the East German border controls. Initially, mobile trolleys serving alcohol and tobacco, they were soon shops integrated into the station offering food, alcohol, tobacco, books, toys, jewelry, cosmetics, gift items, and more. One could disembark from the U-Bahn, buy something, and then get back on the next train and go back to West Berlin, all without going through East German border controls. Purchases could be made with any fully convertible currency, such as U.S. dollars, French francs, pounds sterling, Swiss francs, and especially the West German Deutschmark. The merchandise was offered duty-free, which made especially the alcohol and tobacco products particularly attractive to passengers from West Berlin. This was also known to the West Berlin customs agency, which sometimes checked travelers coming from the Friedrichstraße at their first station in West Berlin.

Between 1985 and 1987, a minor renovation of the train shed took place, where the middle wooden roofing section was replaced with glass. The lighting was replaced and the metal parts of the shed were repainted.

=== After the fall of the Berlin Wall to the present ===
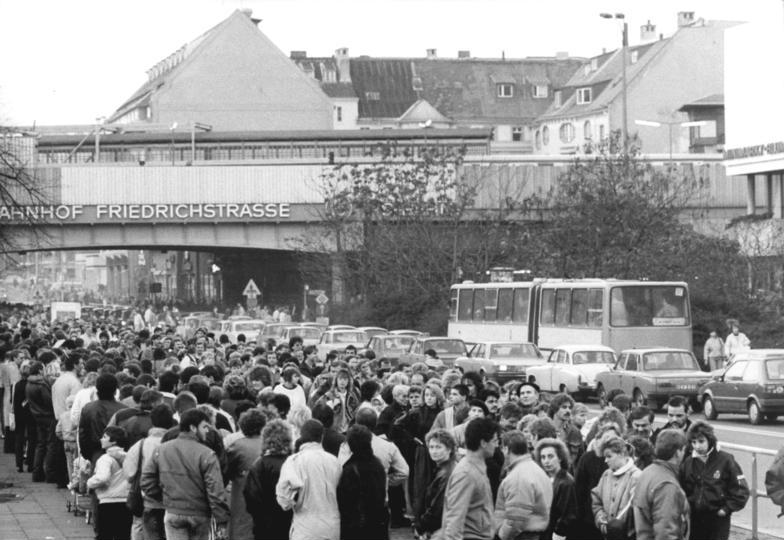
Thousands of East Berliners line up at the station to cross into West Berlin on 10 November 1989, a day after the Fall of the Wall

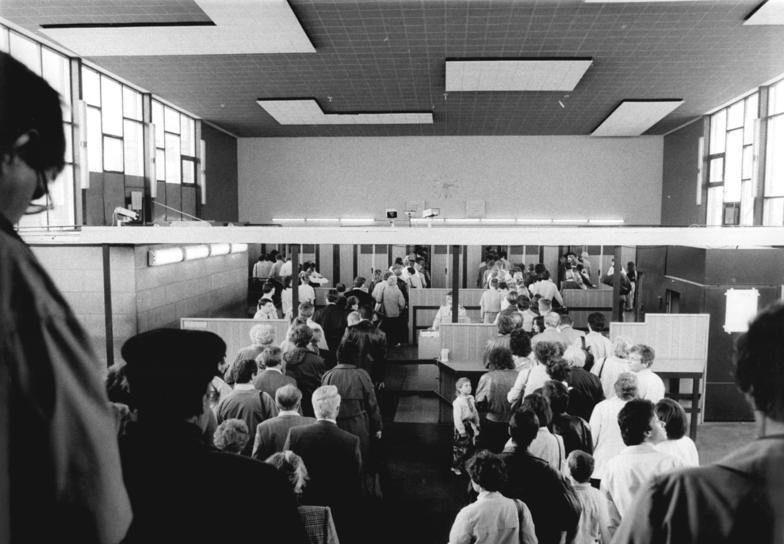
Crowds going through checkpoints inside the Palace of Tears in 1990.

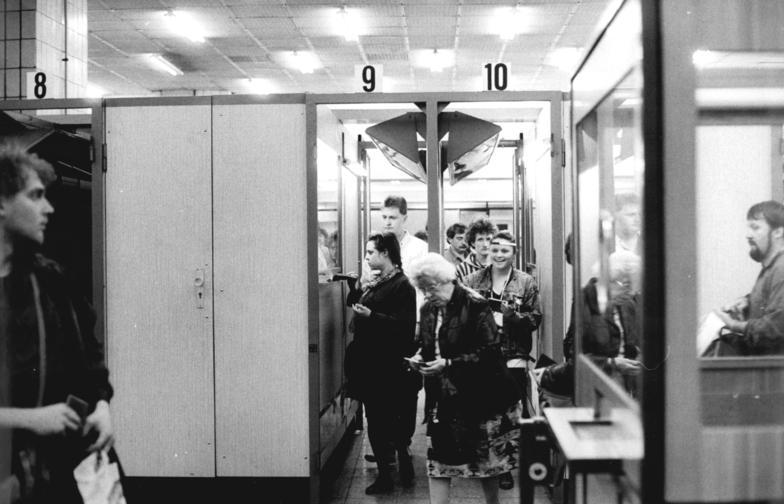
All smiles while undergoing immigration checks in 1990.

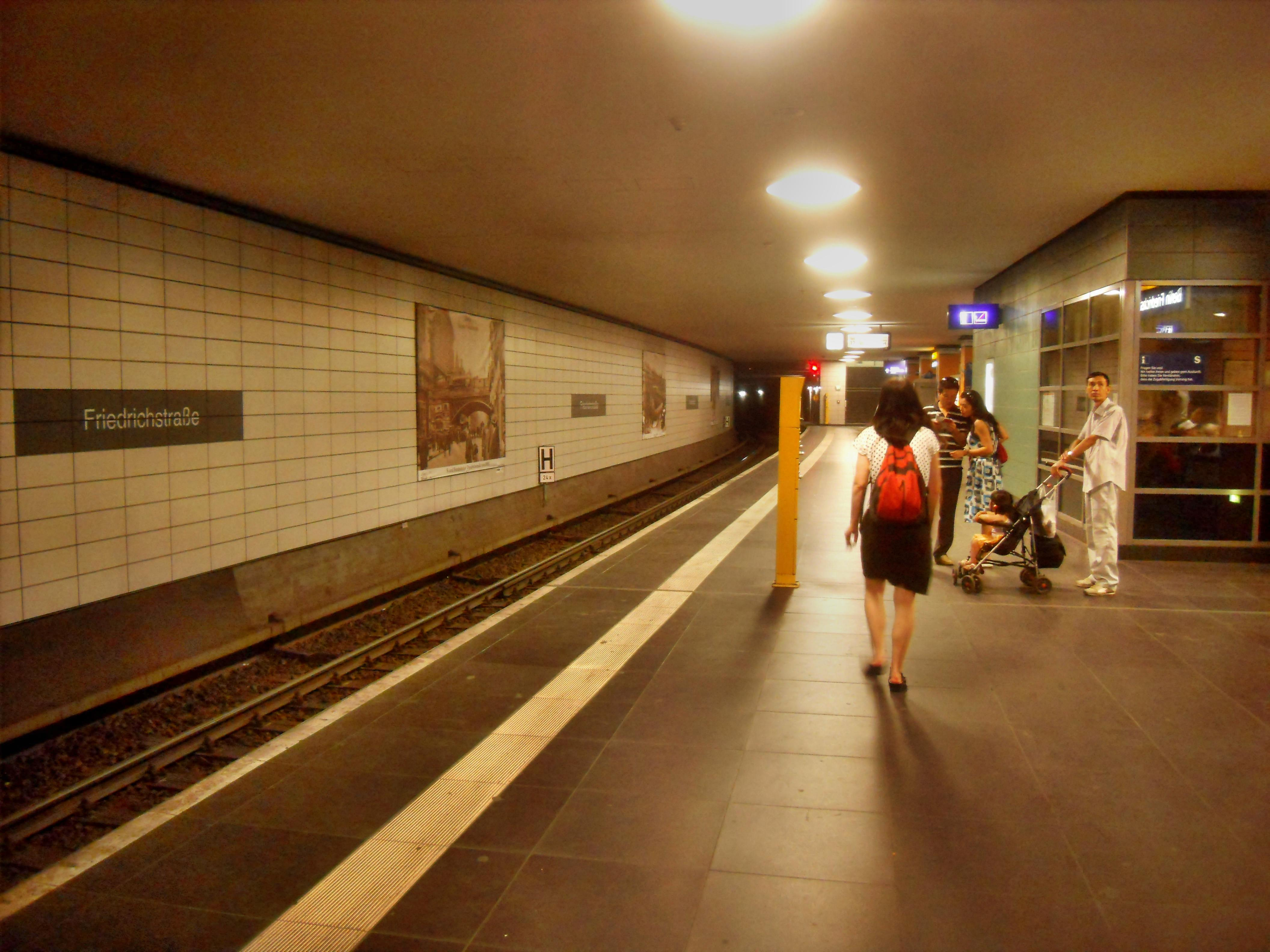
Underground S-Bahn Station. Only S1, S2 and S25 stop at the station

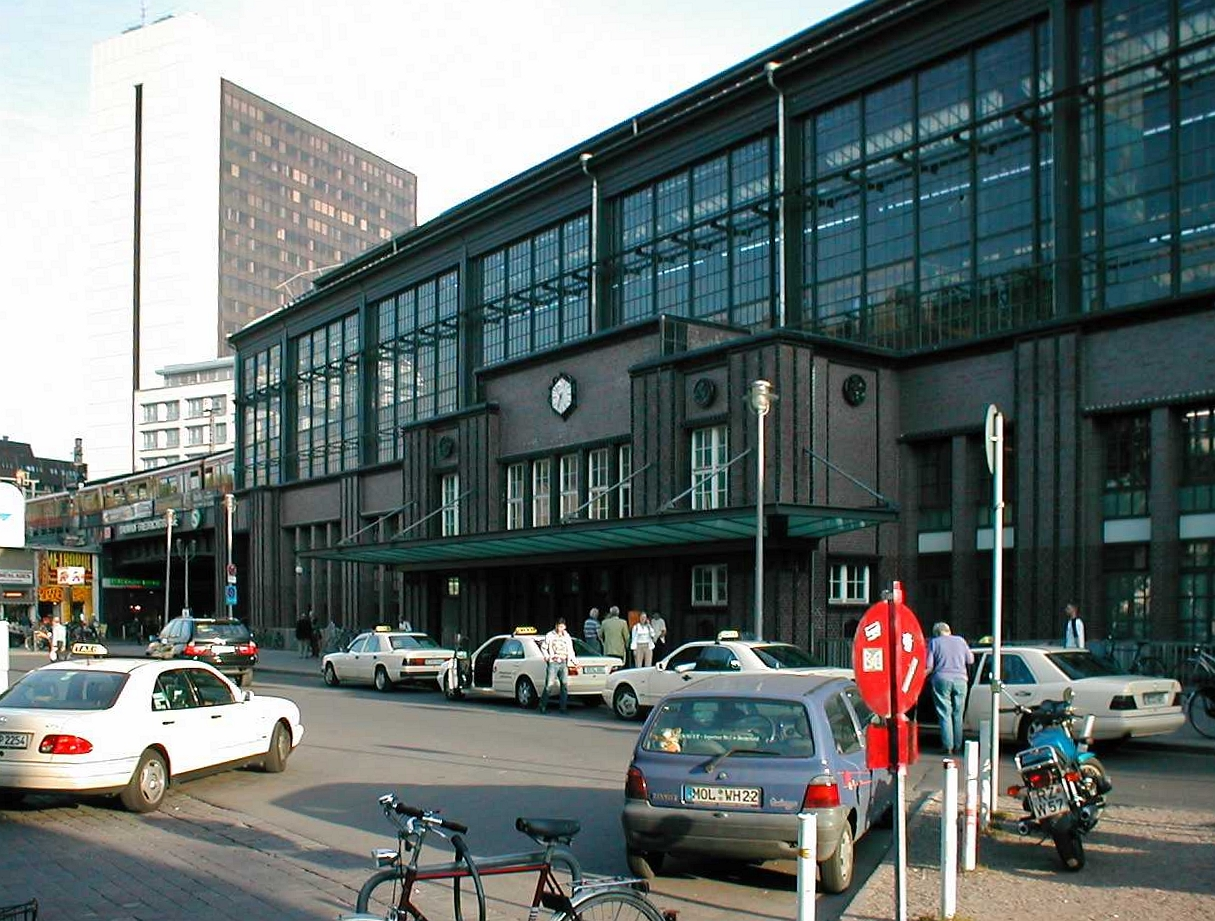
The renovated station, with its restored terra cotta clinker bricks as wall covering

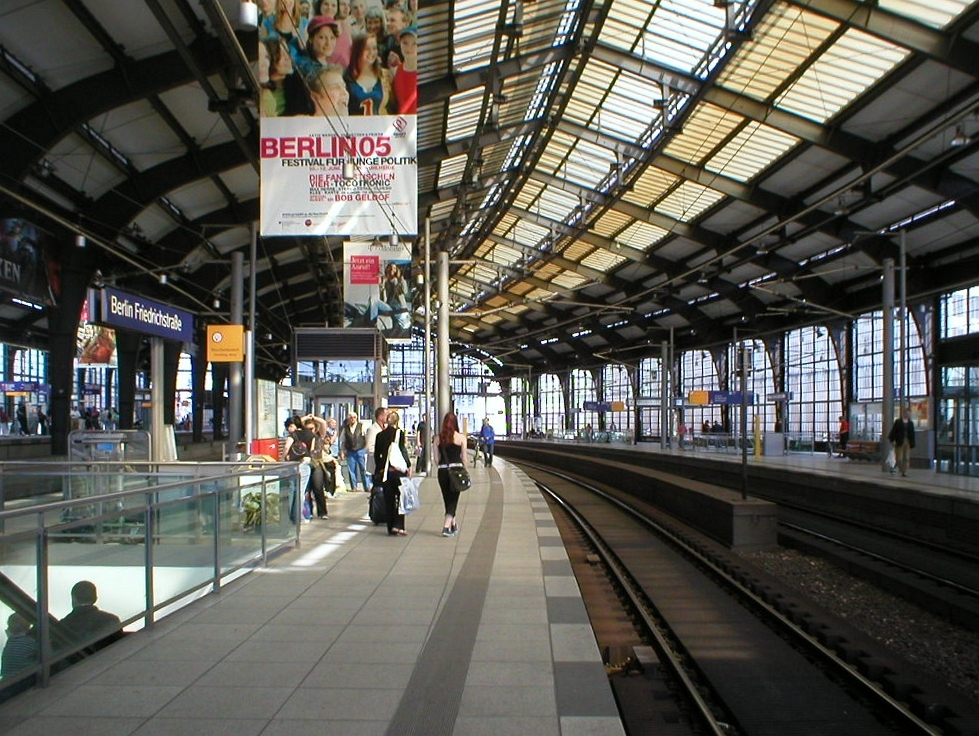
Platform and train shed on the Berlin Stadtbahn viaduct

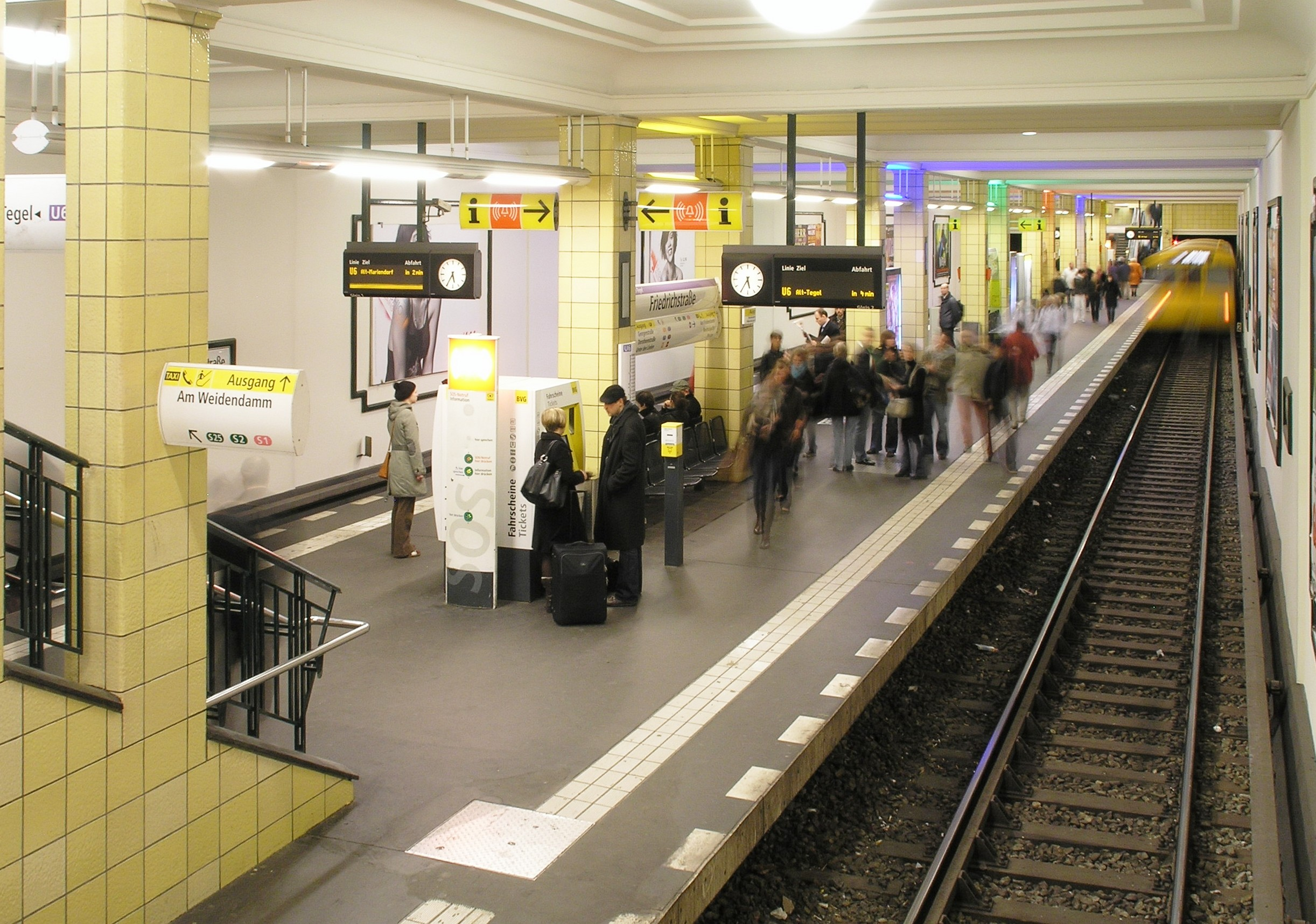
The Berlin U-Bahn station of the Friedrichstraße station

Immediately after the fall of the Berlin Wall, the traffic for the S-Bahn in Berlin as well as long-distance train traffic to and from Berlin increased dramatically. At first, to immediately ease travel between East and West Berlin, the walls and barriers that were built to separate the station were removed. By July 1990, the severed tracks on platform C were reconnected, and after almost 29 years, there was again uninterrupted traffic on the Stadtbahn viaduct line from Berlin Alexanderplatz station to Berlin Zoo station. Very little maintenance had been done to the station during the East German years, and especially the underground section resembled a relic from a bygone age.

Between August 1991 and February 1992, the North-South S-Bahn tunnel, including the underground section of the Friedrichstraße station, was closed for renovation. Due to the damage caused by World War II, it was fully closed. The last wartime flood damage was removed in December 1991.

Between October 1995 and September 1999, the ground level and the raised level on the Stadtbahn viaduct was completely renovated, costing Deutsche Bahn a total of 220 million Deutschmarks. The façade of the building was covered with terra cotta clinker bricks as the original building had, this time including the southern elevation of the building. An additional tunnel for traffic to the U-Bahn U6 was driven under the station, and elevators were added between the floors. The 5,200 square metres (56,000 sq ft) ground floor was converted into a shopping area with 50 businesses. Since reopening, regional trains now stop on platforms A and B.

Beginning in 2002, the North-South S-Bahn tunnel was again renovated, which removed the last traces of East Germany from Friedrichstraße station - the green tiles covering the walls.

On 30 November 2008, a memorial named Trains to Life – Trains to Death was unveiled for the 10,000 Jewish children saved by the Refugee Children Movement, and to those deported, that started their journey at this station. Frank Meisler, the sculptor of the memorial, was himself saved by one of the trains bound for London Liverpool Street station (where a similar memorial marks the children's arrival).

== Rail services ==
In the 2026 timetable the following lines stop at the station:

Line	Route (main stops)	Frequency
FEX	Berlin-Charlottenburg – Berlin Zoologischer Garten – Berlin Hbf – Berlin Friedrichstraße – Berlin Alexanderplatz – Berlin Ostbahnhof – Berlin Ostkreuz – Flughafen BER	Some late night services only
HBX	Harz-Berlin-Express; Berlin Ostbahnhof – Berlin Friedrichstraße – Berlin Hbf – Berlin Zoologischer Garten – Potsdam – Magdeburg – Halberstadt (train split) – Quedlinburg – Thale / Wernigerode – Goslar	Some trains at the weekend
RE 1	Magdeburg – Brandenburg – Potsdam – Berlin Hbf – Berlin Friedrichstraße – Erkner – Fürstenwalde – Frankfurt (Oder) (– Cottbus)	2–3 per hour
RE 2	Wismar – Schwerin – Wittenberge – Nauen – Berlin Hbf – Berlin Friedrichstraße – Königs Wusterhausen – Lübben – Cottbus	Hourly
RE 7	Dessau – Bad Belzig – Michendorf – Berlin Hbf – Berlin Friedrichstraße – Berlin Brandenburg Airport – Wünsdorf-Waldstadt – Lübben (Spreewald) – Senftenberg	Hourly
RB 14	Nauen – Falkensee – Berlin-Spandau – Berlin-Charlottenburg – Berlin Hbf – Berlin Friedrichstraße – Berlin Ostbahnhof	Hourly
RB 23	Golm – Potsdam – Potsdam Griebnitzsee – Berlin-Wannsee – Berlin Hbf – Berlin Friedrichstraße – Berlin Ostbahnhof	Some trains in peak

=== S-Bahn and U-Bahn services ===
Line	Route (main stops)	Frequency (mins)
S1	Oranienburg – Wittenau – Gesundbrunnen – Friedrichstraße – Potsdamer Platz – Schöneberg – Steglitz – Wannsee	10
S2	Bernau – Karow – Pankow – Gesundbrunnen – Friedrichstraße – Potsdamer Platz – Südkreuz – Blankenfelde	10
S25	Hennigsdorf – Tegel – Gesundbrunnen – Friedrichstraße – Potsdamer Platz – Südkreuz – Lichterfelde – Teltow	20
S26	Blankenburg – Pankow – Gesundbrunnen – Friedrichstraße – Potsdamer Platz – Südkreuz – Lichterfelde – Teltow	20
S3	Spandau – Westkreuz – Hauptbahnhof – Friedrichstraße – Alexanderplatz – Ostbahnhof – Karlshorst – Köpenick – Erkner	20
S5	Westkreuz – Hauptbahnhof – Friedrichstraße – Alexanderplatz – Ostbahnhof – Lichtenberg – Strausberg Nord	10
S7	Potsdam – Wannsee – Westkreuz – Hauptbahnhof – Friedrichstraße – Alexanderplatz – Ostbahnhof – Lichtenberg – Ahrensfelde	10
S9	Spandau – Westkreuz – Hauptbahnhof – Friedrichstraße – Alexanderplatz – Ostbahnhof – Schöneweide – Berlin Brandenburg Airport	20
U6	Alt-Tegel – Borsigwerke – Holzhauser Straße – Otisstraße – Scharnweberstraße – Kurt-Schumacher-Platz – Afrikanische Straße – Rehberge – Seestraße – Leopoldplatz – Wedding – Reinickendorfer Straße – Schwartzkopffstraße – Naturkundemuseum – Oranienburger Tor – Friedrichstraße – Unter den Linden – Französische Straße (former) – Stadtmitte – Kochstraße – Hallesches Tor – Mehringdamm – Platz der Luftbrücke – Paradestraße – Tempelhof – Alt-Tempelhof – Kaiserin-Augusta-Straße – Ullsteinstraße – Westphalweg – Alt-Mariendorf	5

S-Bahn and regional trains stop at the upper platforms A - C on the Berlin Stadtbahn viaduct, elevated above the city streets. This upper level of the station is enclosed by two train shed halls. The smaller shed on the north side is used for the S-Bahn, the larger on the south for regional trains. Platform D is a station on the North-South tunnel of the S-Bahn, located underground, approximately aligned with the eastern bank of the Spree river.

The underground station for the U6 line is located at the eastern end of the station, directly under the Friedrichstraße. In addition, the south side of the station serves as a station and terminus for a number of trams and buses of the Berlin transportation company.

== Shops ==
Since the remodeling in 1999, the station houses numerous shops, boutiques and restaurants, making the station blend in with the neighboring Friedrichstraße shopping area. In addition, the station houses a Berlin S-Bahn customer center, and a Deutsche Bahn travel center. On the plaza on the south side of the station is a large Taxi rank, and the station is also connected to the Berlin bus and tram system.

The former Tränenpalast was used as a club and stage for various performances, such as readings, concerts, and cabaret until 2006. Since September 2011, the building has become a branch museum of the Bonn-based Haus der Geschichte (House of History) and hosts a permanent exhibition devoted to the history of crossing the inner-German border, with a particular emphasis on what it was like to cross between East and West Berlin.

== In popular culture ==
There are numerous movies that include scenes filmed at the Friedrichstraße station:

- In the Bourne Supremacy, Jason Bourne escapes the police by leaping off the bridge in front of the station onto a boat below.
- In The Keys to the House, the windows of the father and son's hotel room face the station at platform level.
- The movie The Legend of Rita has numerous scenes where the Red Army Faction terrorists use the station to escape to East Berlin.

The East German spy Werner Stiller describes his escape through the station in his memoirs Beyond the Wall.
