= Berlin Alexanderplatz station =

German train station

Alexanderplatz
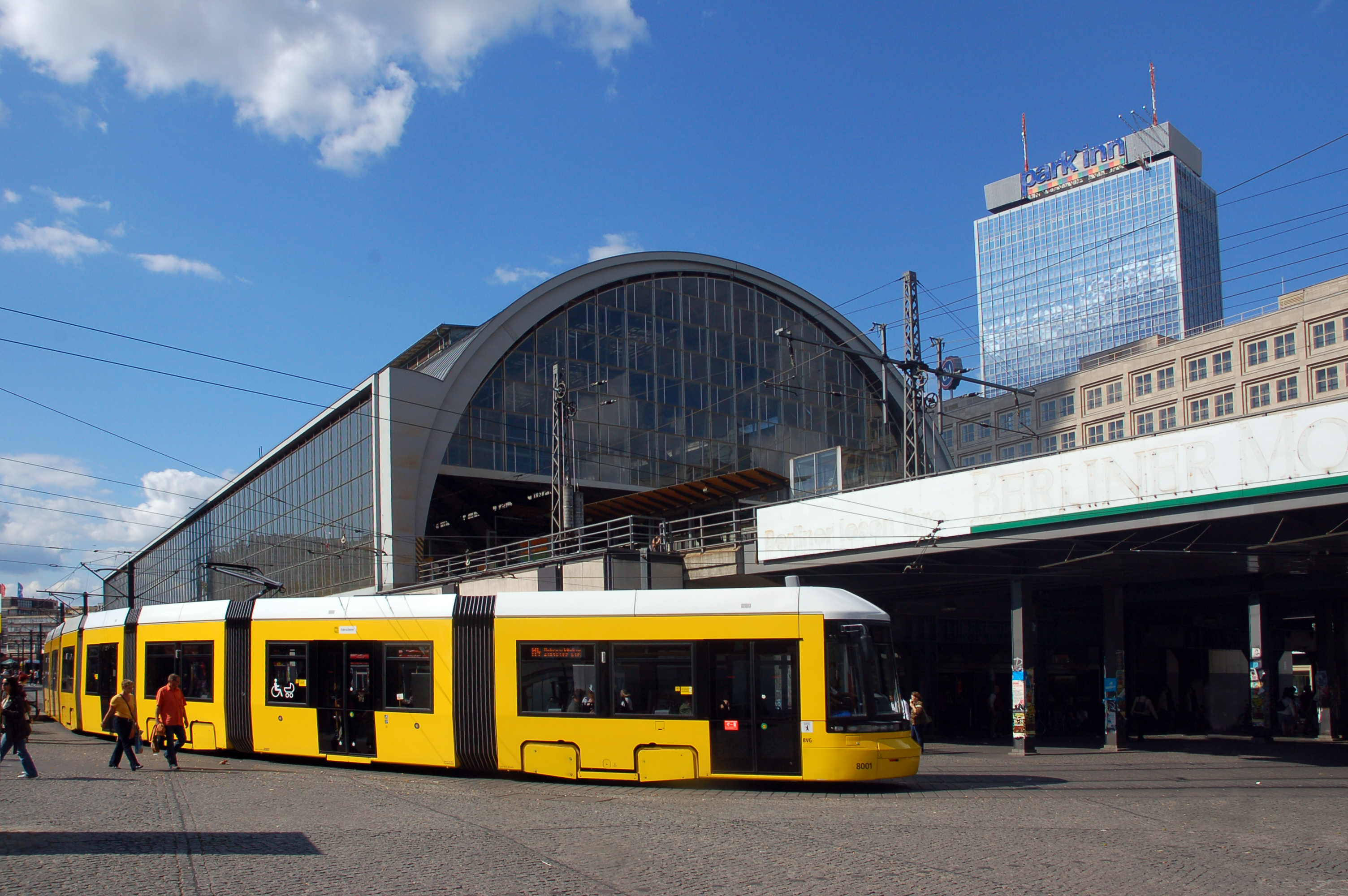
- Alexanderplatz station, 2009

General information
- Location: Mitte, Berlin; Germany
- Coordinates: 52°31′17″N 13°24′43″E
- Owner: Deutsche Bahn
- Operator: DB InfraGO
- Line: Berlin Stadtbahn
- Platforms: 2 island platforms (Stadtbahn); 1 island platform (U2); 2 island platforms (U5); 1 island platform (U8)
- Tracks: 4 (Stadtbahn); 2 (U2); 4 (U5); 2 (U8)
- Connections: : M2, M4, M5, M6; : 100, 200, 248, 300, N2, N5, N8, N40, N42, N60, N65

Construction
- Structure type: Elevated (Stadtbahn); Underground (U-Bahn)
- Cycle facilities: Call a Bike
- Accessible: Yes

Other information
- Station code: 53
- DS100 code: BALE
- Category: 3
- Fare zone: : Berlin A/5555
- Website: www.bahnhof.de

History
- Opened: 1882

Passengers
- 2018: 140,000
Services
Preceding station	DB Regio Nordost	Following station
Berlin Friedrichstraße towards Berlin Charlottenburg	Flughafen-Express Limited service	Berlin Ostbahnhof towards BER Airport
Berlin Friedrichstraße towards Dessau Hbf	RE 7	Berlin Ostbahnhof towards Senftenberg
Berlin Friedrichstraße towards Nauen	RB 14	Berlin Ostbahnhof Terminus
Berlin Friedrichstraße towards Golm	RB 23	Berlin Ostkreuz towards BER Airport
Preceding station	Ostdeutsche Eisenbahn	Following station
Berlin Friedrichstraße towards Brandenburg Hbf or Magdeburg Hbf	RE 1	Berlin Ostbahnhof towards Cottbus Hbf or Frankfurt (Oder)
Berlin Friedrichstraße towards Nauen	RE 2	Berlin Ostkreuz towards Cottbus Hbf
Preceding station	Abellio Rail Mitteldeutschland	Following station
Berlin Friedrichstraße towards Thale Hbf or Goslar	Harz-Berlin-Express	Berlin Ostbahnhof Terminus
Preceding station	Berlin S-Bahn	Following station
Hackescher Markt towards Spandau	S3	Jannowitzbrücke towards Erkner
Hackescher Markt towards Westkreuz	S5	Jannowitzbrücke towards Strausberg Nord
Hackescher Markt towards Potsdam Hbf	S7	Jannowitzbrücke towards Ahrensfelde
Hackescher Markt towards Spandau	S9	Jannowitzbrücke towards BER Airport
Preceding station	Berlin U-Bahn	Following station
Klosterstraße towards Ruhleben	U2	Rosa-Luxemburg-Platz towards Pankow
Rotes Rathaus towards Berlin Hbf	U5	Schillingstraße towards Hönow
Weinmeisterstraße towards Wittenau	U8	Jannowitzbrücke towards Hermannstraße
Route map
U2 station
U5 station
U8 station
S-Bahn station
Location

Berlin Alexanderplatz is a German railway station in the Mitte district of Berlin's city centre. It is one of the busiest transport hubs in the Berlin area, servicing surface-level trams and buses as well as the U-Bahn, S-Bahn, and regional rail. The station takes its name from its location on Alexanderplatz, near the Fernsehturm and the World Clock. It is open 24/7.

== Overview ==
Like other long-distance stations, Alexanderplatz is also a shopping centre for selling merchandise to travellers. Due to its importance and central location, it is a site where tourists regularly transfer and is a major hub of the Berlin U-Bahn network.

Four Regional-Express and Regionalbahn lines, as well as S-Bahn lines S3, S5, S7, and S9, call at the overground station. The adjacent underground station is one of the largest on the Berlin U-Bahn network, with lines U2, U5, and U8 stopping there. The station is also served by four tram lines, as well as four bus lines during the day and many night bus lines.

== History ==
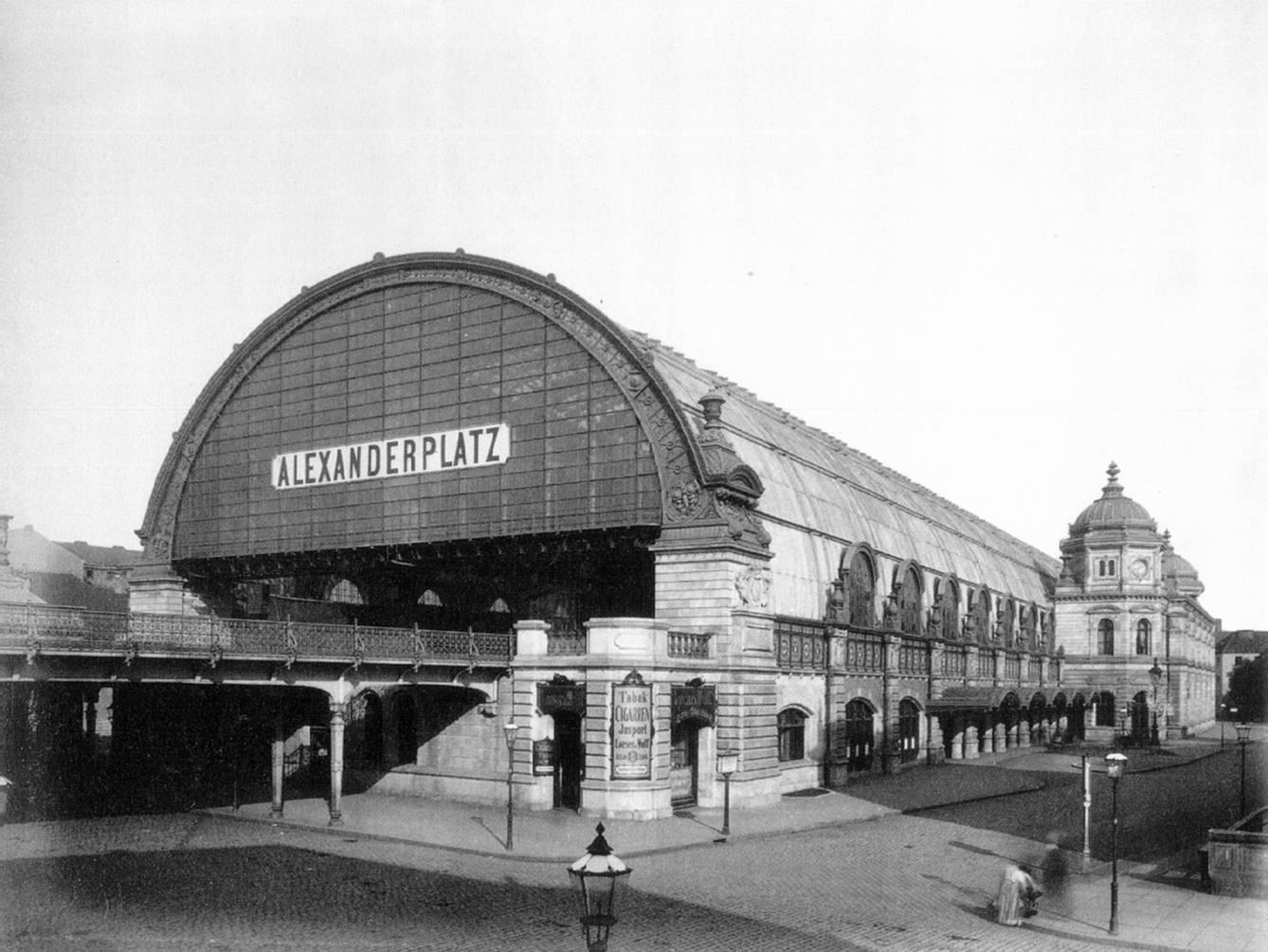
Alexanderplatz station, 1885

Alexanderplatz station opened on 7 February 1882 on the Berlin Stadtbahn viaduct from Charlottenburg to Ostbahnhof (then named Schlesischer Bahnhof). In 1926, the station hall, spanning two platforms with four tracks, was rebuilt in its present plain style. Heavily damaged in World War II, train service at the station resumed on 4 November 1945, while the reconstruction of the hall continued until 1951.

The first station of the present U-Bahn line U2, designed by Alfred Grenander, entered service on 1 July 1913; the station was then the eastern terminus of Berlin's second line from Potsdamer Platz via Spittelmarkt. The platforms of lines U8 and U5 opened on 18 April 1930 and 21 December 1930 respectively, also built according to Grenander's conception, but in a distinct Modern style. The U2 station was also renovated after the Alexanderplatz fire in 1972.

The eastern entrances were destroyed on 15 March 1945.

The U8 station was also a ghost station during the division of Berlin from 13 August 1961 to 1 July 1990. The stationmaster's offices were also built; these were shifted and walls were removed. The entrance at Dirksenstraße had to be made accessible again, just like the connecting stairs to the mall and to the platforms of Line E. Besides that, the intercommunication staircase was also built towards Line E so that it would go through the dimly lit platforms. Stainallee was renamed a few months after the closure of the stairs. In all cases, the U-Bahn stations had to be recognizable as such on the surface. The U-Bahn logo has been removed in recent years. The station also had to undergo renovation works from 17 May to 30 June 1990 before the full reopening on 1 July 1990.

The U2 station was renovated between January and March 2001. The U5 station was renovated between February 2003 and September 2004; it was the western terminus of the line from 1930 to December 2020, when it was extended to Berlin Hauptbahnhof.

== Train services ==
In the 2026 timetable, the following lines stop at the station:

Line	Route	Frequency
FEX	Berlin-Charlottenburg – Berlin Zoologischer Garten – Berlin Hbf – Berlin Friedrichstraße – Berlin Alexanderplatz – Berlin Ostbahnhof – Berlin Ostkreuz – Flughafen BER	Some late night services only
HBX	Harz-Berlin-Express; Berlin Ostbahnhof – Alexanderplatz – Berlin Hbf – Berlin Zoologischer Garten – Potsdam – Magdeburg – Halberstadt (train split) – Quedlinburg – Thale / Wernigerode – Goslar	Some trains at the weekend
RE 1	Magdeburg – Brandenburg – Potsdam – Berlin-Wannsee – Berlin Hbf – Alexanderplatz – Berlin Ostbahnhof – Erkner – Fürstenwalde (Spree) – Frankfurt (Oder) (– Cottbus)	2–3 per hour
RE 2	Nauen – Berlin-Spandau – Berlin Hbf – Alexanderplatz – Berlin Ostbahnhof – Berlin Ostkreuz – Königs Wusterhausen – Lübbenau (Spreewald) – Vetschau – Cottbus	Hourly
RE 7	Dessau – Bad Belzig – Michendorf – Berlin-Wannsee – Berlin Hbf – Alexanderplatz – Berlin Ostbahnhof – Königs Wusterhausen – Lübben (Spreewald) – Senftenberg	Hourly
RB 14	Nauen – Falkensee – Berlin-Spandau – Berlin Hbf – Alexanderplatz – Berlin Ostbahnhof	Hourly
RB 23	Golm – Potsdam – Potsdam Griebnitzsee – Berlin-Wannsee – Berlin Alexanderplatz – Berlin Ostkreuz – BER Airport	Some trains in peak
S3	Spandau – Westkreuz – Hauptbahnhof – Alexanderplatz – Ostbahnhof – Ostkreuz – Karlshorst – Köpenick – Erkner	Every 10 mins
S5	Westkreuz – Hauptbahnhof – Alexanderplatz – Ostbahnhof – Ostkreuz – Lichtenberg – Strausberg Nord	Every 10 mins
S7	Potsdam – Wannsee – Westkreuz – Hauptbahnhof – Alexanderplatz – Ostbahnhof – Ostkreuz – Lichtenberg – Ahrensfelde	Every 10 mins
S9	Spandau - Westkreuz – Hauptbahnhof - Alexanderplatz – Ostbahnhof – Schöneweide – BER Airport	Every 20 mins

== Gallery ==
Stadtbahn and U-Bahn lines

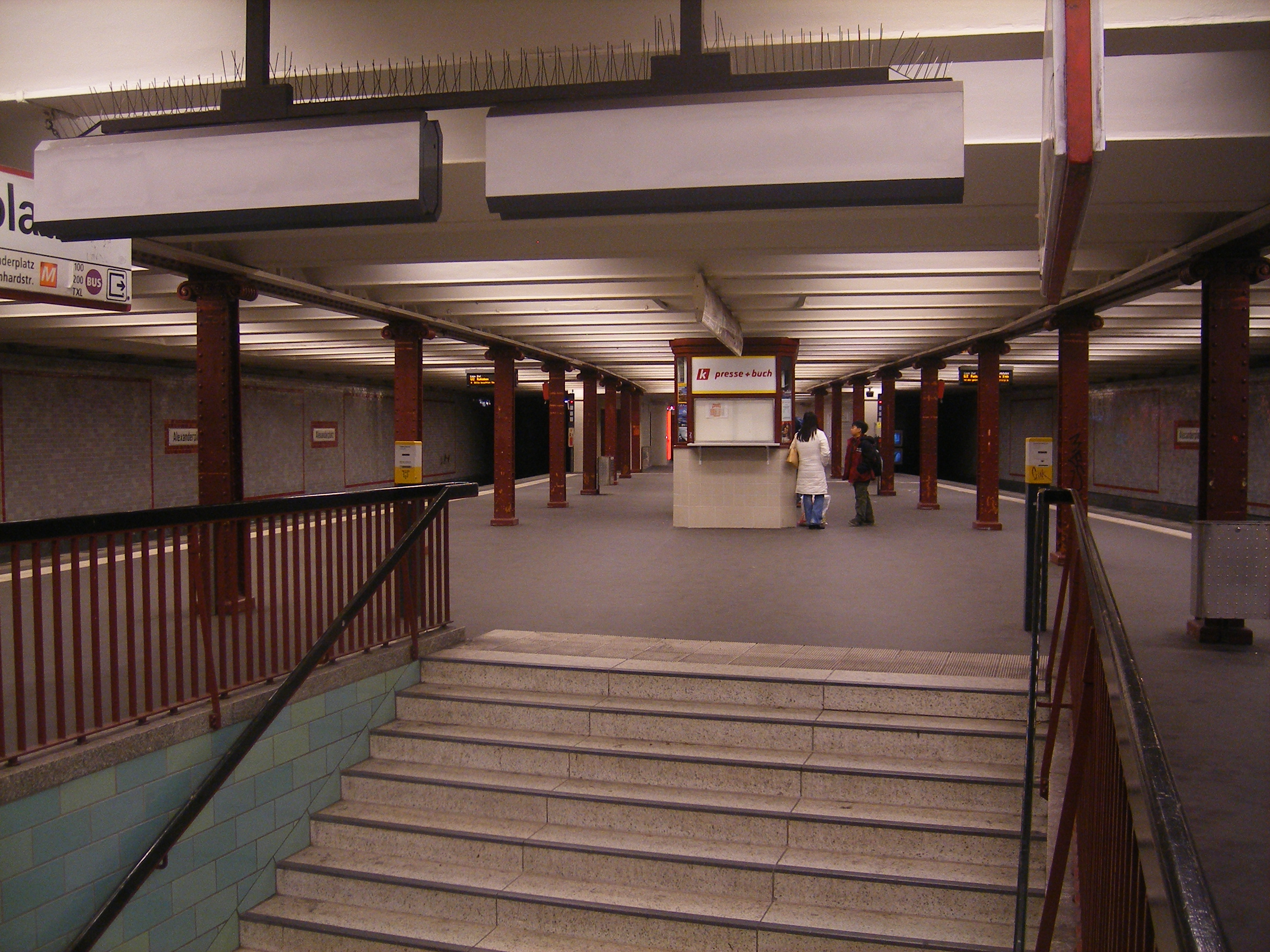
U2 platform, looking to the north

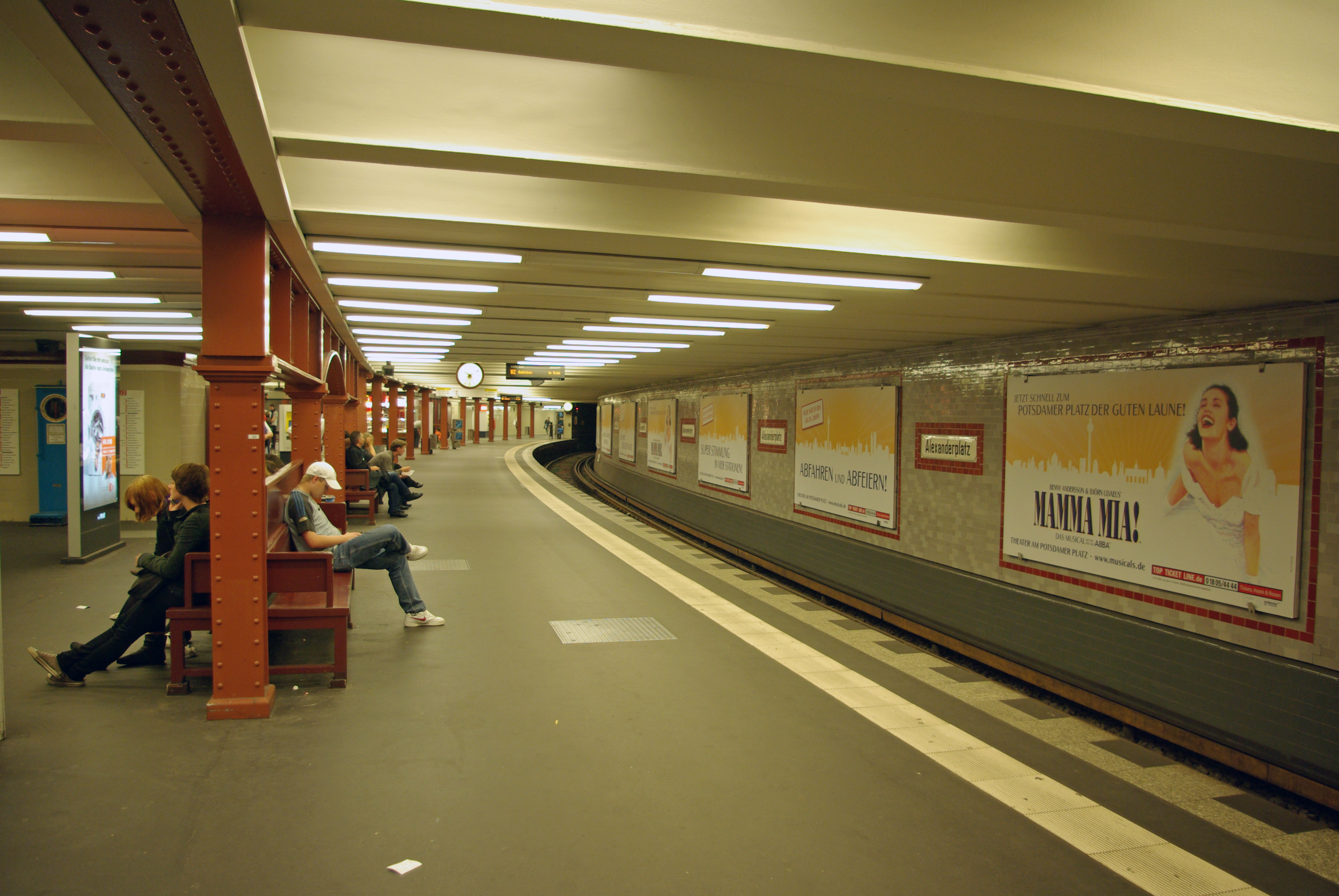
U2 platform

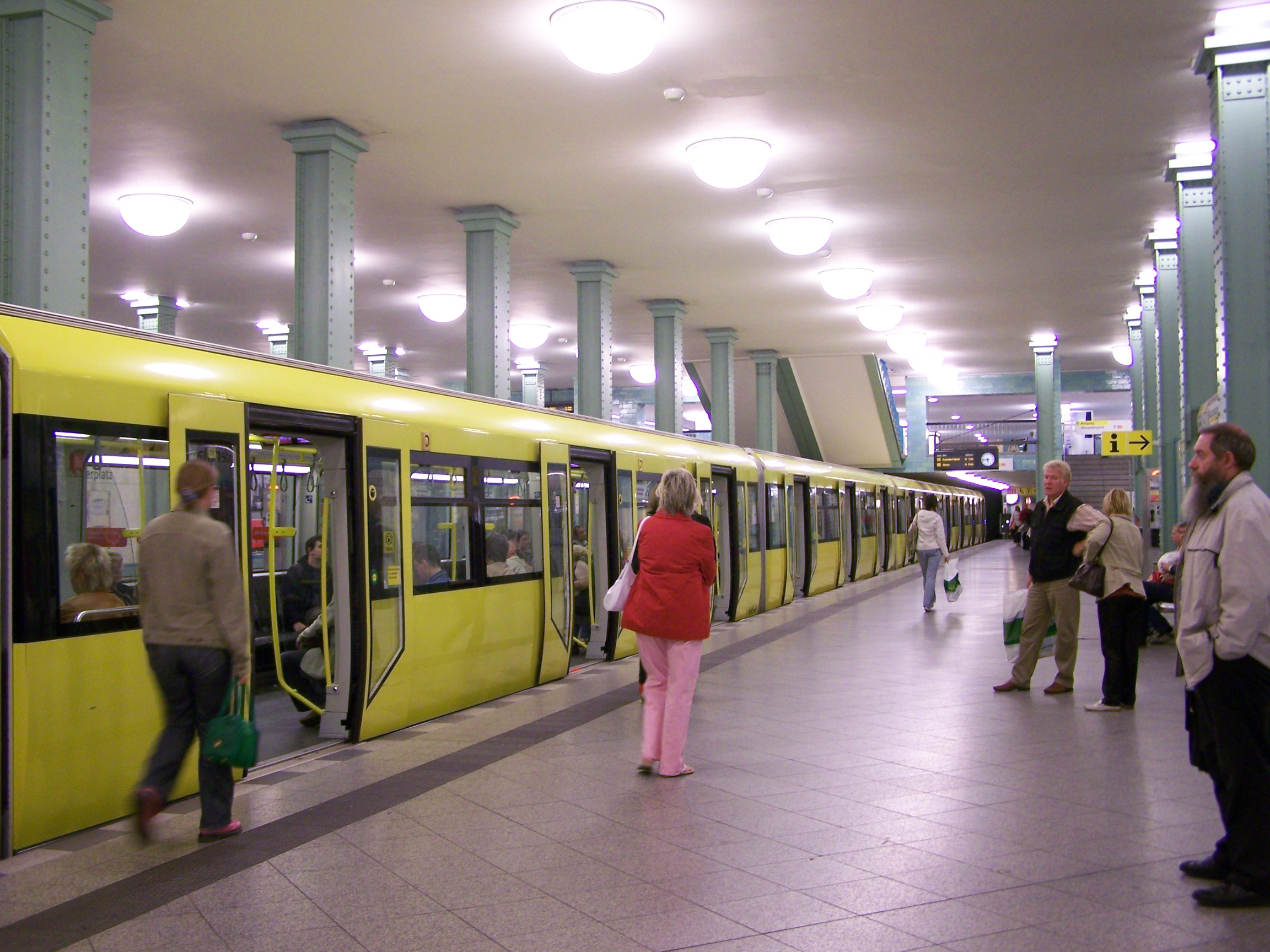
U5 platform, with a new H type waiting to depart for Hönow

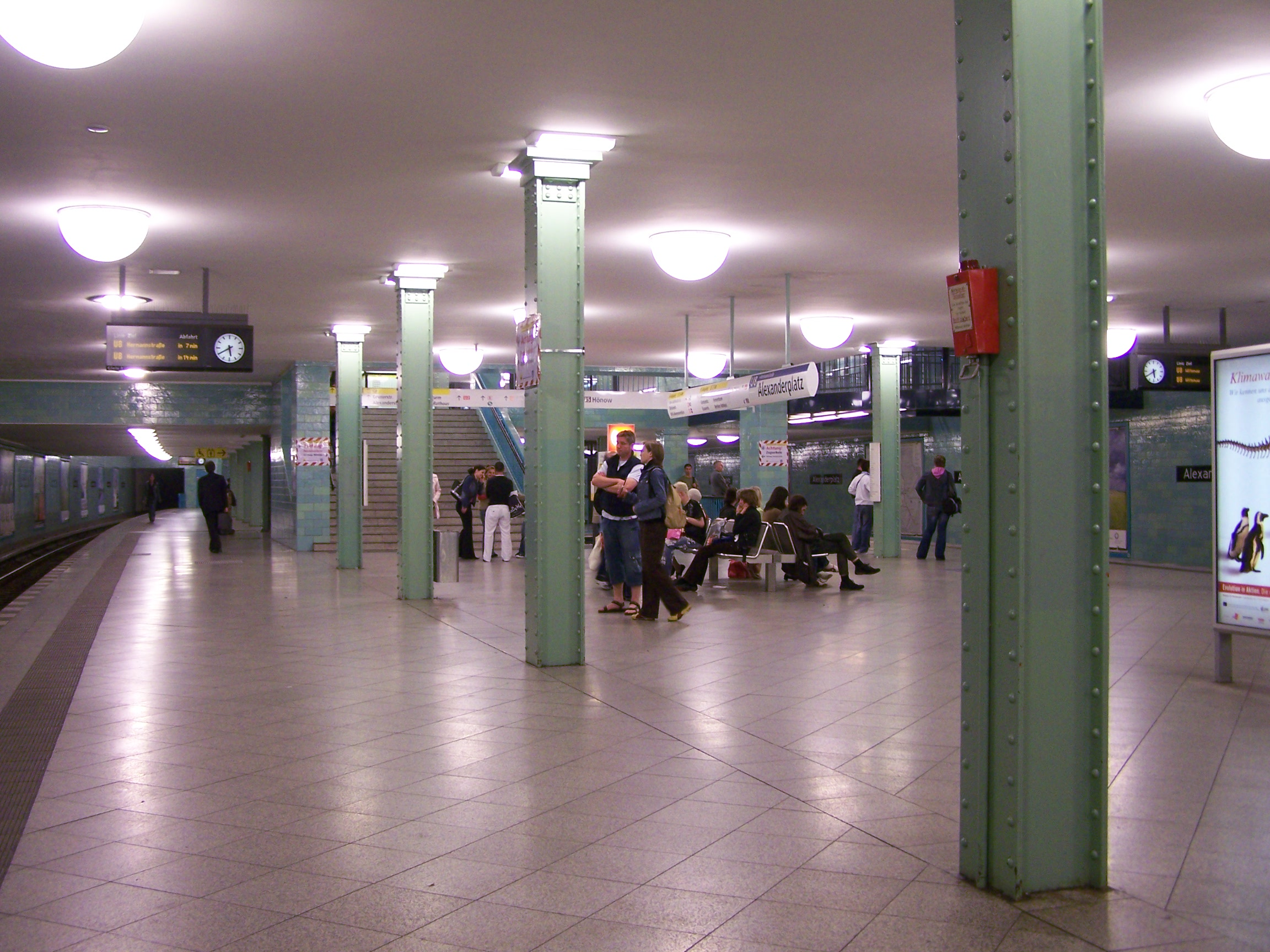
U8 platform

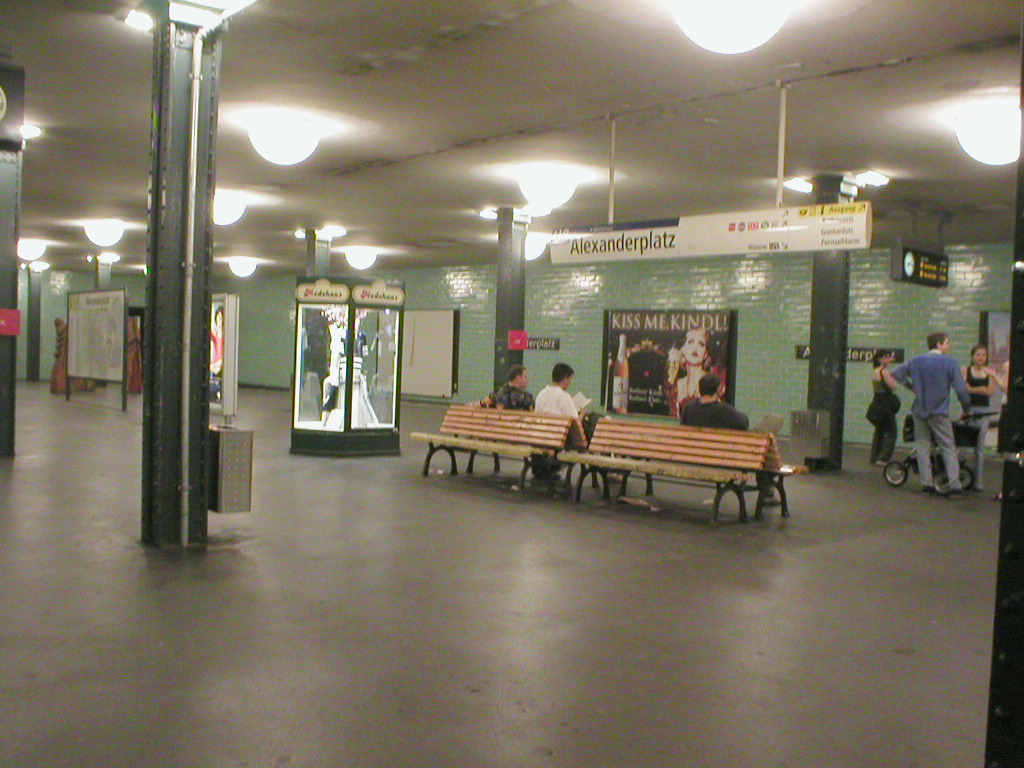
U8 platform before renovation in 2004

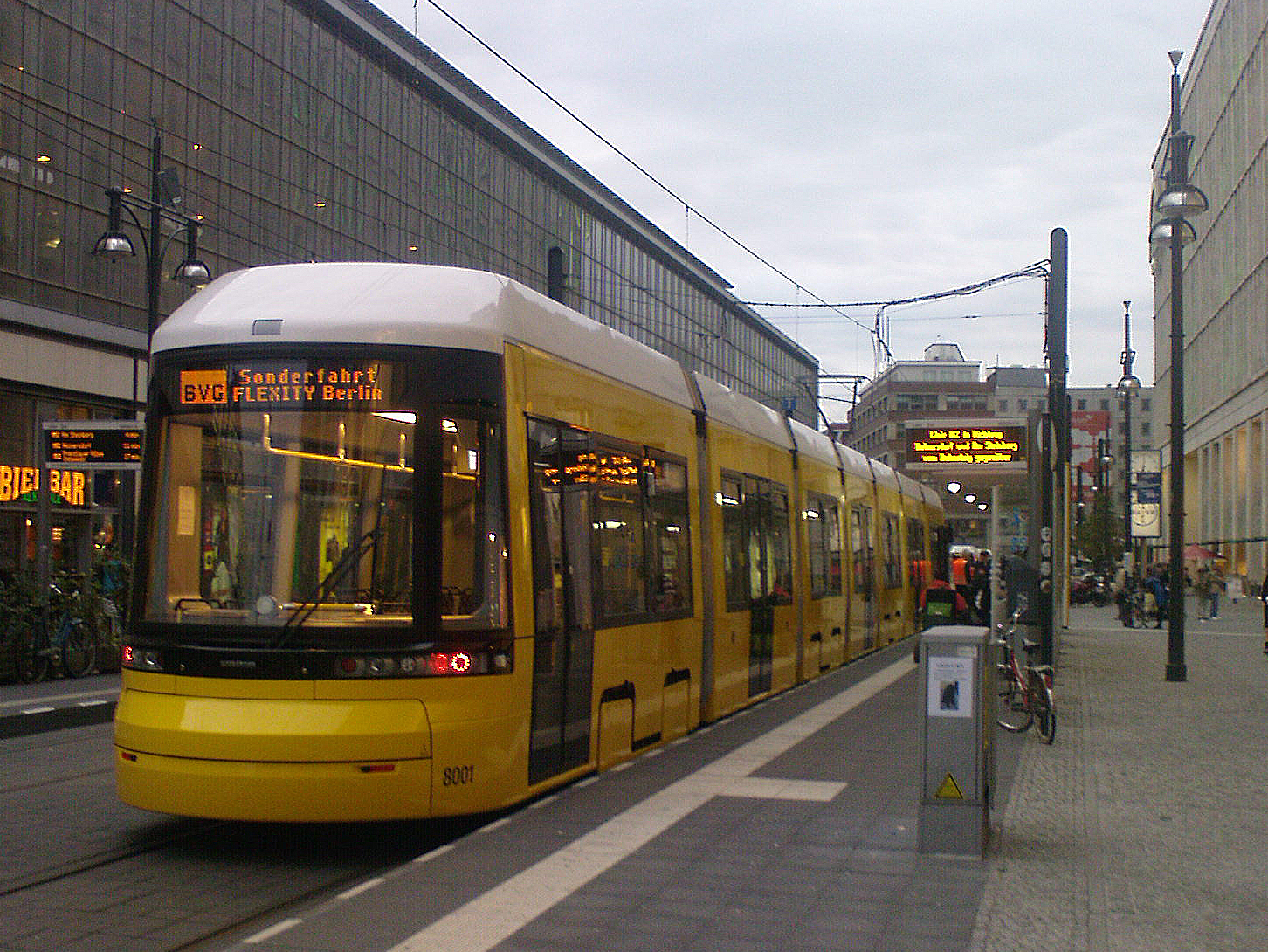
Flexity Berlin tram at Alexanderplatz

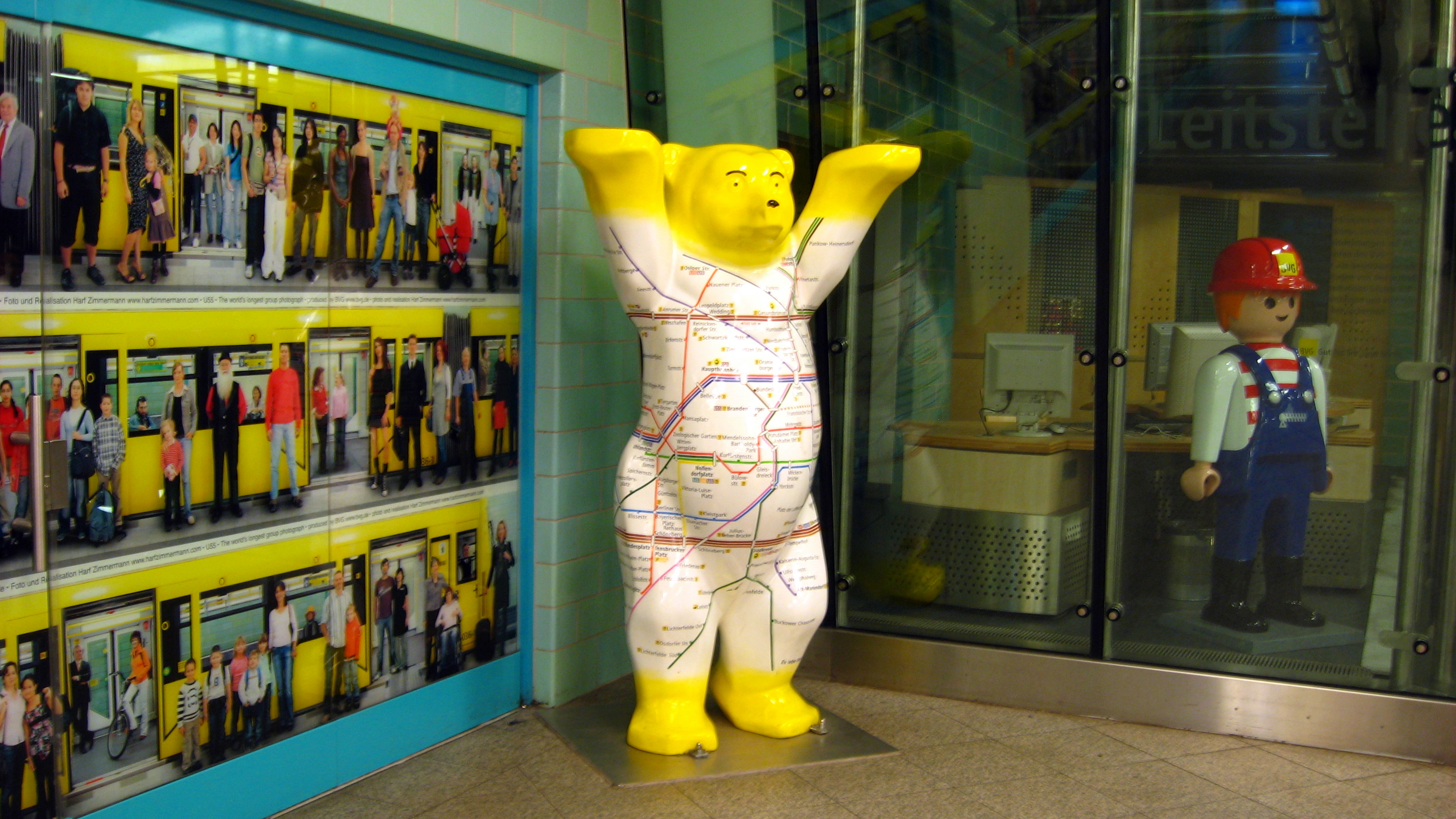
Metro-Bear-Berlin: This Buddy Bear with its map of the Berlin U-Bahn and S-Bahn can be found in Alexanderplatz station
