= Berlin Stadtbahn =

Historic railway line in Berlin, Germany

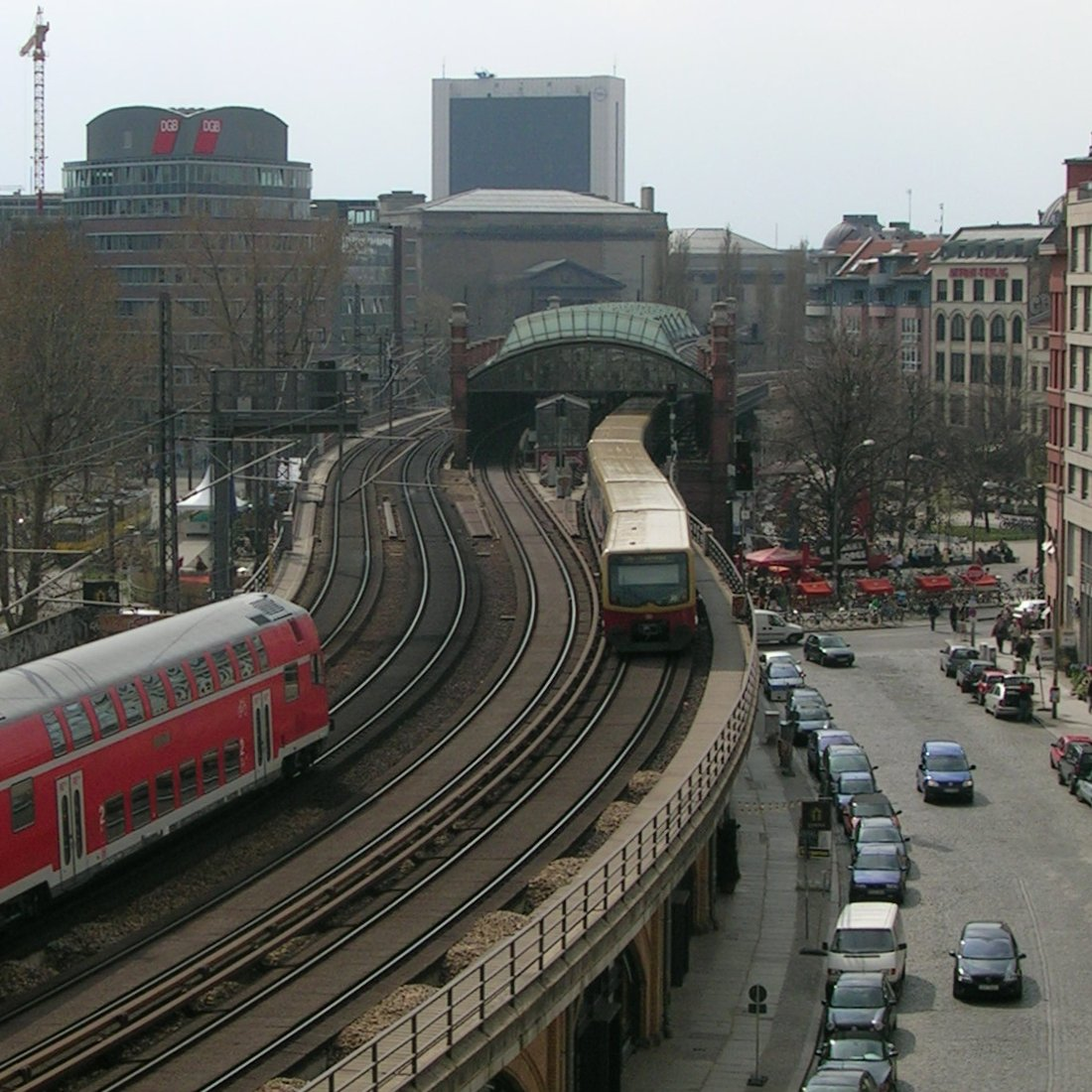
- Hackescher Markt station, with RE and S-Bahn trains

Overview
- Line number: 6003, 6024 (DB)
- Locale: Berlin

Technical
- Track gauge: 1,435 mm (4 ft 8 1/2 in) standard gauge
- Electrification: Berlin S-Bahn: 750 V DC on third rail; Main line: 15 kV, 16.7 Hz AC on overhead line
Route map
- Source: German railway atlas

The Berlin Stadtbahn is a historic elevated railway viaduct in Berlin. It runs from Ostbahnhof in the east to Charlottenburg in the west, connecting several major destinations in central Berlin, including Berlin Central station. The line has been a protected heritage structure since 1995. The tracks which connect the viaduct to Ostkreuz and Westkreuz at either end of the line are sometimes considered part of the Stadtbahn, although this is not technically correct.

The line connects the city's Zoo, Bellevue Palace, snakes around the governmental district to the Berlin Hauptbahnhof and Friedrichstraße, crosses Museum Island (Note: Where, notably, none of the lines stop.), and moves on to Alexanderplatz (Fernsehturm) and beyond.

First completed in 1882, it spans 12 kilometers (7.5 mi) and 11 stations. 8 kilometers (5.0 mi) of its length are elevated on 731 masonry viaduct arches. A further 2 kilometers (1.2 mi) of the line is situated on 64 bridges, that cross adjoining streets and (three times) the river Spree. The remaining length of the line is on an embankment.

Today, the Stadtbahn is one of the busiest sections of rail in Germany. The line carries four tracks, operated as two pairs. The northern pair carry four S-Bahn lines, which service all 11 stations, and the southern pair of tracks are used by Regionalbahn, Regional-Express, Intercity, EuroCity and Intercity-Express. Six of the Stadtbahn stations have platforms on the southern tracks, though not all trains serve them.

== History ==
=== Planning ===
In 1871, eight main line railways existed in Berlin, with terminal stations at the city's edge or outside the city limits. This was very impractical for many passengers, who were forced to use hackney carriages to transfer from one train to another. Therefore, a railway line was planned to connect these termini with each other.

In 1872, the Deutsche Eisenbahnbaugesellschaft (German Railway Construction Company - DEG) filed the planning application for a railway line through the city, connecting the then-Schlesischer Bahnhof (today Berlin Ostbahnhof) to Charlottenburg, and continuing to Potsdam. In December 1873, the state of Prussia as well as the private rail enterprises Berlin-Potsdamer Eisenbahn, Magdeburg-Halberstädter Eisenbahn and Berlin-Hamburger Bahn bought shares in the DEG, and jointly founded the Berliner Stadteisenbahngesellschaft (Berlin City Railway Company). However, things did not go as expected and the DEG went into bankruptcy in 1878, which forced the Prussian state government to take over operations, pay for the construction of the line with state money and to reimburse the former private owners of the DEG. The state's interest in the line was attributed to the military, which after the 1870-1871 Franco-Prussian War was of the opinion that the railway networks would hinder mobilisation when not properly interconnected.

On 15 July 1878 the Königliche Direktion der Berliner Stadteisenbahn (Royal Directorate of Berlin Urban Railways), under the management of Ernst Dircksen, was commissioned to manage the site. The directorate at first reported to the Prussian Ministry of Transport and later became a subsidiary of the Ministry of Public Operations.

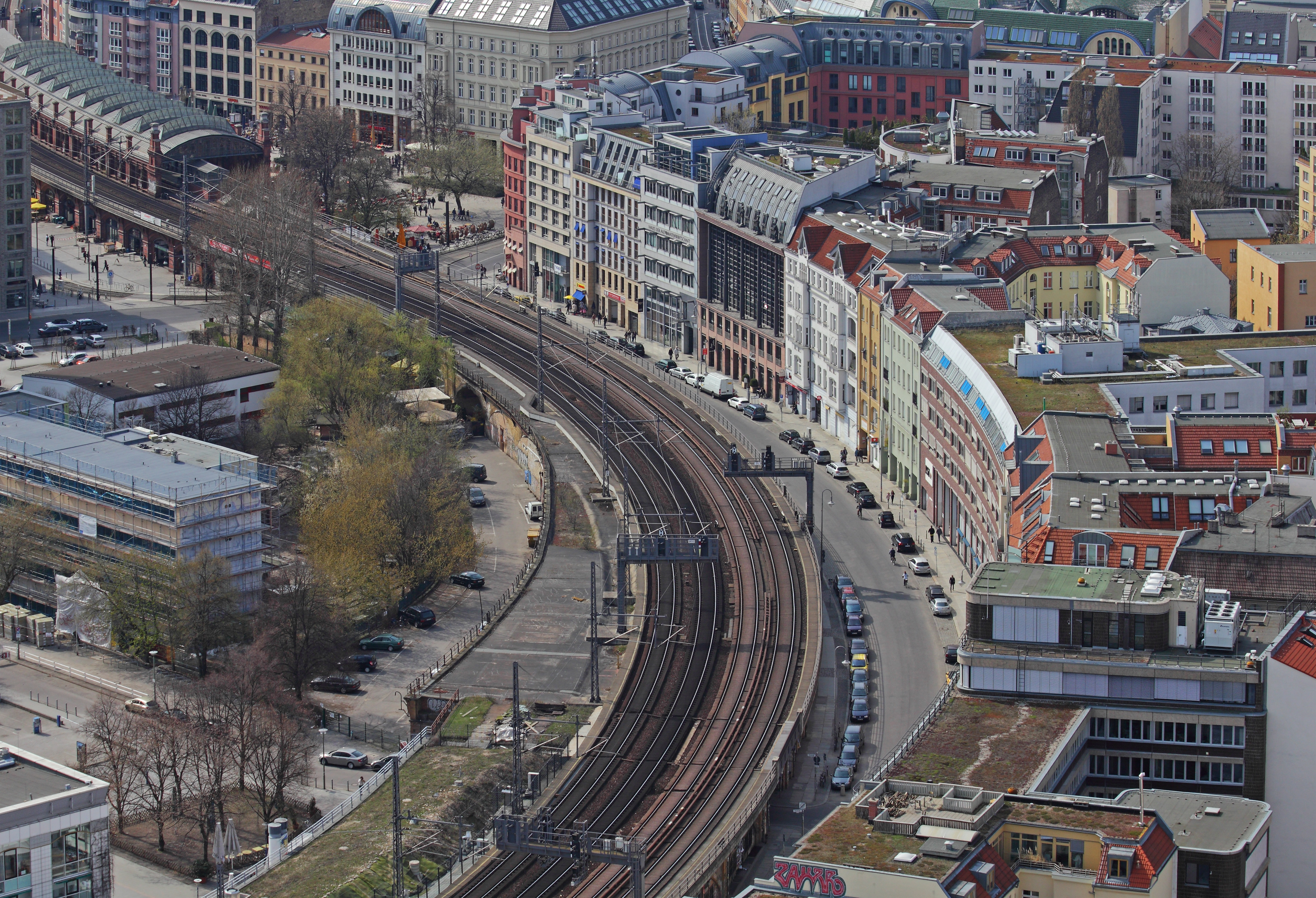
Stadtbahn seen from the Park Inn Berlin, near station Hackescher Markt

The planned railway had two tracks each for freight and passenger traffic. Having taken similar projects in London and New York City into consideration, passenger traffic received priority over freight trains. Furthermore, the new railway line was not only to serve as a connection between the mainline termini in Berlin, but would also offer connections to the Berlin Ringbahn and the suburban rail lines.

The traffic routing was not only influenced by the location of the already existing stations the line was supposed to connect, but also by land availability in the city centre. One of the original drafts, which called for building the line along Leipziger Straße, had to be scrapped because of overly high land prices. The moat of the 17th century Berlin Fortress was filled up between Hackescher Markt and Jannowitzbrücke stations and, since it was public land, was used for building the railway line. This explains some of the curvy sections on the Stadtbahn, especially between Alexanderplatz and Jannowitzbrücke stations.

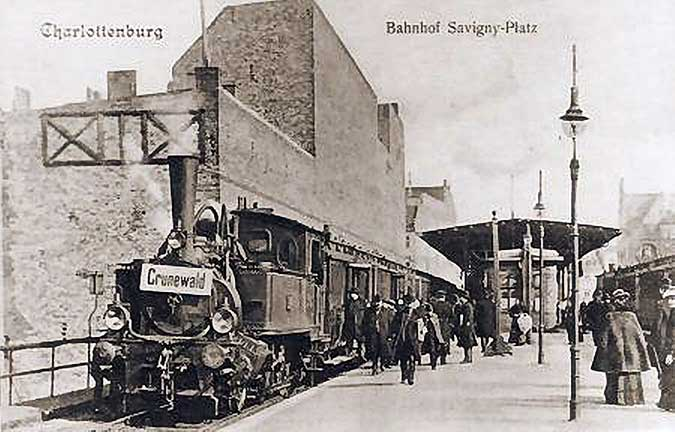
Berliner Stadteisenbahn: Station Savignyplatz with a Prussian T2

Its elevated nature sets the Stadtbahn apart from the previous Berliner Verbindungsbahn, built in 1851, which was built at street level and was a hindrance to travel.

=== Construction ===
Work on the line started in 1875 and the Stadtbahn was opened on 7 February 1882 for local traffic; it opened on 15 May the same year for long-distance trains. The costs of construction, including purchase of the land, were estimated at about 5 million Goldmark per kilometre. The line would later become the core route of the Berlin S-Bahn. The Stadtbahn was originally equipped with longitudinal iron sleepers on the Haarmann system, however these were replaced with wooden sleepers in the early 20th century.

The line initially only had 9 stations. Two stations were later added: Tiergarten (5 January 1885) between Zoologischer Garten and Bellevue, and Savignyplatz (1 August 1896) between Charlottenburg and Zoologischer Garten.

Since 1 May 1888 the Stadtbahn also connected to Stralau-Rummelsburg (Ostkreuz since 1933) in the east and Westend (via Westkreuz) in the west.

=== Initial operation ===
==== Suburban trains ====
Suburban trains operated on the local tracks, the so-called city track. At first, these were either services to the suburbs or connections to the Berlin Ringbahn, running as "half ring trains", using the Stadtbahn and either the northern or the southern Ringbahn. The trains were pulled by locomotives, which ran on coke to minimise the smell. Doors on the train compartments had to be opened by the passengers themselves and stations were not called out on the train.

These trains ran from 4 o'clock in the morning to 1 o'clock at night, typically at intervals between two and five minutes, depending on the time of day. Fares in the early 20th century were 10 pfennig in 3rd class and 15 pfennig in 2nd class.

==== Freight traffic ====
The freight traffic to the central market at Alexanderplatz was carried by seven special trains per day, of which four ran at night, two during the day and one in the evening. Apart from this, the Stadtbahn carried no freight; normal freight traffic instead used the freight stations Charlottenburg, Moabit, Wedding, Zentralviehhof, Weißensee, Frankfurter Allee, Rixdorf, Tempelhof, Wilmersdorf-Friedenau and Halensee on the ring line.

==== Long-distance trains ====
In the first years of the Stadtbahn, many trains previously terminating at the old termini Lehrter Bahnhof, Görlitzer Bahnhof or Potsdamer Bahnhof operated via the Stadtbahn to reduce the load on the terminus stations. By the end of the 19th century, however, most of these train runs had to terminate at their old destination stations again due to the increasing local traffic on the Stadtbahn.

The remaining traffic on the Stadtbahn mostly consisted of express trains to Hanover and Cologne via the Lehrter Bahn, Kanonenbahn trains to Dessau, trains to Königsberg and Danzig on the Preußische Ostbahn and trains to Frankfurt/Oder and Breslau. Suburban trains to Spandau and Strausberg also ran on the Stadtbahn's long-distance tracks until 1928.

Trains heading west usually left from the Schlesischer Bahnhof station, those heading east from Charlottenburg. Depots were situated in Rummelsburg (then called Bw Karlshorst) and Grunewald.

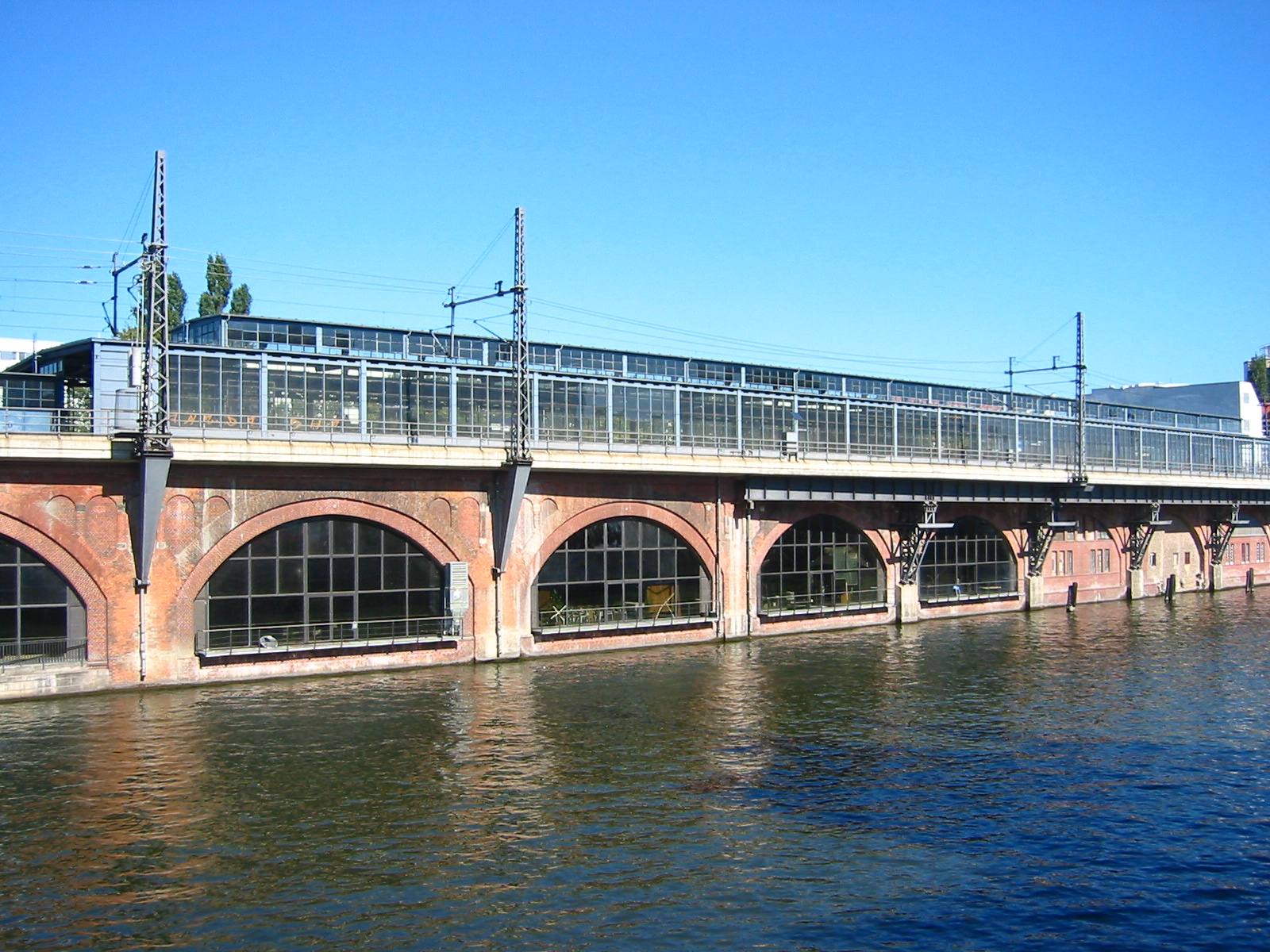
Station Jannowitzbrücke

=== Station expansions and viaducts ===
In 1914, the Friedrichstraße station was rebuilt; the long-distance section of the station was expanded to four tracks and the current station hall was built. Between 1922 and 1932, the Stadtbahn viaduct was thoroughly modernised in order to handle the ever-increasing train weight. Also, the train sheds of Alexanderplatz and Schlesischer Bahnhof were replaced. The suburban line's platforms were raised to a height of 96 centimetres.

A second long-distance platform and a new hall were built at Zoo station from 1934 to 1940. The station hall was only glazed in the 1950s, however. The notable terraced vestibule dates from the same time.

=== Electric operation ===
The S-Bahn logo

On 11 June 1928 the suburban line Potsdam-Stadtbahn-Erkner was fully equipped with DC third rail gear. Five trains of the new DRG Class ET 165 – the type appropriately named Stadtbahn – went into service, still sharing the track with steam trains. By November 1928 all lines leading toward the Stadtbahn, namely the lines from Kaulsdorf, Spandau and Grünau as well as the Berlin Ringbahn, were fully electrified. Therefore, suburban services to Spandau could be moved from the long-distance tracks to the local tracks. The last steam trains disappeared in 1929 when the ring became fully operated by electric trains. Half-ring trains operated only as peak time services. In December 1930 the term S-Bahn and the symbol of a white S on a green circle were introduced for the city, ring and suburban services.

=== Post-War situation ===
After World War II, the Stadtbahn lay devastated by bombs, but was rebuilt very quickly. Because Joseph Stalin wanted to travel by train to the Potsdam Conference, the Stadtbahn was converted to the Russian 1,520 mm (4 ft 11 27/32 in) broad gauge in 1945. The national importance had diminished with the loss of eastern Germany; only a few trains ran towards the western zones. Some trains from the Soviet zone terminated on the Stadtbahn.

During the Berlin Blockade, the long-distance traffic came to an almost complete halt. The Stadtbahn was useful for the re-established S-Bahn, however, now with connections to places line Königs Wusterhausen, Strausberg, Staaken and Falkensee.

From 18 May 1952, when all Berlin terminal stations and all other long-distance stations in West Berlin were closed, the station Zoologischer Garten remained the only long-distance station for the western part of the city. The last domestic train of the GDR (East German) railways ran on the Stadtbahn in 1953.

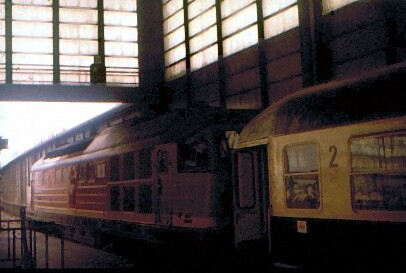
Transit train at Zoo station 1976

After the Berlin Wall was built in 1961, Zoologischer Garten became the West Berlin and Ostbahnhof the East Berlin de facto central station. The station Friedrichstraße now was the terminal point of the separated West and East Berlin S-Bahn lines and departure point for the Interzonenzug (Inter-zone train) services between West Berlin and West Germany. Friedrichstraße station was separated into Eastern and Western parts with steel walls, and enabled West Berliners to change to S-Bahn trains running on the Nord-Süd-Bahn and the U6 line of the Berlin U-Bahn without passing through GDR border controls. The station also featured a border crossing into East Berlin. Through trains between Zoo and Ostbahnhof only existed in international traffic, for example the Paris to Warsaw trains. Later, through coaches and shuttle trains connecting to the night trains to Scandinavia crossed the intra-German border on the Stadtbahn as well.

Due to a quirk in legislation, the West Berlin parts of the Stadtbahn belonged to the Deutsche Reichsbahn, which made it (and therefore the GDR government) one of the largest landowners in West Berlin. Regular quarrels erupted between the DR, the GDR government, the West Berlin Senate and the Allied occupation powers.

Prices for the West Berlin S-Bahn were kept slightly below the fares of the West Berlin BVG. In East Berlin, a flat fee of 0.20 Mark was charged until 1991. West Berlin politics and most of the populace fully boycotted the S-Bahn, which was run by the East German railways, and introduced bus and U-Bahn lines running parallel to the S-Bahn network and the Stadtbahn.

=== Restoration during the Cold War ===
Despite problems, the Deutsche Reichsbahn made improvements to the line and reconstructed at great expense the Westkreuz railway station which had been built on swamp land.

Meanwhile, the number of S-Bahn lines running in West Berlin was reduced to just three as a consequence of a strike carried out by the Deutsche Reichsbahn's West Berlin-based employees in September 1980.

On 9 January 1984 a treaty between the GDR and the West Berlin Senate came into force and turned over the responsibility for operation of the S-Bahn in West Berlin to the West Berlin transport authority, the Berliner Verkehrsbetriebe. Soon thereafter, talks with the GDR commenced regarding improvements of the Stadtbahn in West Berlin as well as the modernisation of the Zoologischer Garten station. The Lehrter Stadtbahnhof was also carefully restored to its original 1880s look and became a listed building. In East Berlin, the Ostbahnhof was partially rebuilt and renamed to Hauptbahnhof, in time for the 750th anniversary of Berlin's founding in 1987.

=== After reunification ===
The fall of the Berlin Wall and German reunification made for a sudden spike of importance for the Stadtbahn. The first InterRegio train ran to Cologne in 1990. Since 1991, Intercity trains to Karlsruhe, Cologne and Hamburg used the Stadtbahn. The Hamburg line was soon extended to Dresden and Prague, and the former Interzonenzug trains from Munich were converted to InterCity trains and now ran on the Stadtbahn as well.

The western part of the Stadtbahn was electrified on 4 July 1993 up to Zoologischer Garten station. The eastern part of the line up to Ostbahnhof had been electrified since 1987. As soon as electrification reached the Zoo station, ICE trains began to use the station.

=== Modernisation from 1994 ===
In October 1994 the track was closed and a large-scale modernisation programme was launched. The viaduct sections were checked and strengthened, and the tracks were bedded in concrete to improve durability and comfort. A decision that would turn out to be a mistake in 2022. Almost all stations saw large financial investments and were thoroughly modernised. Long-distance traffic between Zoo and Ostbahnhof stations was interrupted during the construction period, and the S-Bahn trains temporarily used the long-distance line. On 24 March 1998 the Stadtbahn was reopened, now carrying up to three ICE and IC lines as well as five RegionalExpress lines.

Between 2001 and July 2002, part of the Stadtbahn was realigned over the construction of the new Berlin Hauptbahnhof. The realigned section consisted of two 450 m-long bridges spanning the station and the adjacent Humboldthafen port.

Until the summer of 2006, the Stadtbahn was the main thoroughfare for long-distance trains, which usually stopped at Zoologischer Garten and Ostbahnhof (which was renamed in 1998). When the new Hauptbahnhof opened on 28 May 2006 the importance of the line diminished slightly, as many trains now would use the new north-south line connected to the Hauptbahnhof. The remaining intercity trains on the Stadtbahn, mainly those heading toward Hanover and Cologne, now usually call at Hauptbahnhof and Ostbahnhof.

In 2022 the concrete bedding installed between 1994 and 1998 was found to have developed difficult to repair fatigue damage. The attachment points of the thought to be much more durable solution had to be replaced quickly due to safety concerns. As of 2023, the concrete isn't slated to be replaced either; the work would be too complicated and take too much time, because of the viaduct structure.

== Current operation ==
The S-Bahn tracks of the Stadtbahn currently carry the following routes (as of December 2020):

- (Spandau to Erkner)
- (Westkreuz to Strausberg Nord)
- (Potsdam Hauptbahnhof to Ahrensfelde)
- (Spandau to BER Airport — Terminal 1-2).

The longer distance tracks carry Regionalbahn and Regional-Express routes RE1 (Magdeburg to Eisenhüttenstadt), RE2 (Rathenow to Cottbus), RE7 (Dessau to Wünsdorf-Waldstadt) and RB14 (Nauen to Berlin Schönefeld Airport). Although most InterCity and Intercity-Express trains now use the north-south tunnel route via Hauptbahnhof, some trains do still remain on the Stadtbahn's long distance tracks. These trains, mainly those heading toward Hanover and Cologne, usually call at Hauptbahnhof and Ostbahnhof. The RE8 was the only line of the Stadtbahn that had a 24/7 service.
