= Berlin Potsdamer Bahnhof =

Railway station in Mitte, Germany

Coordinates: 52.50703°N 13.37553°E

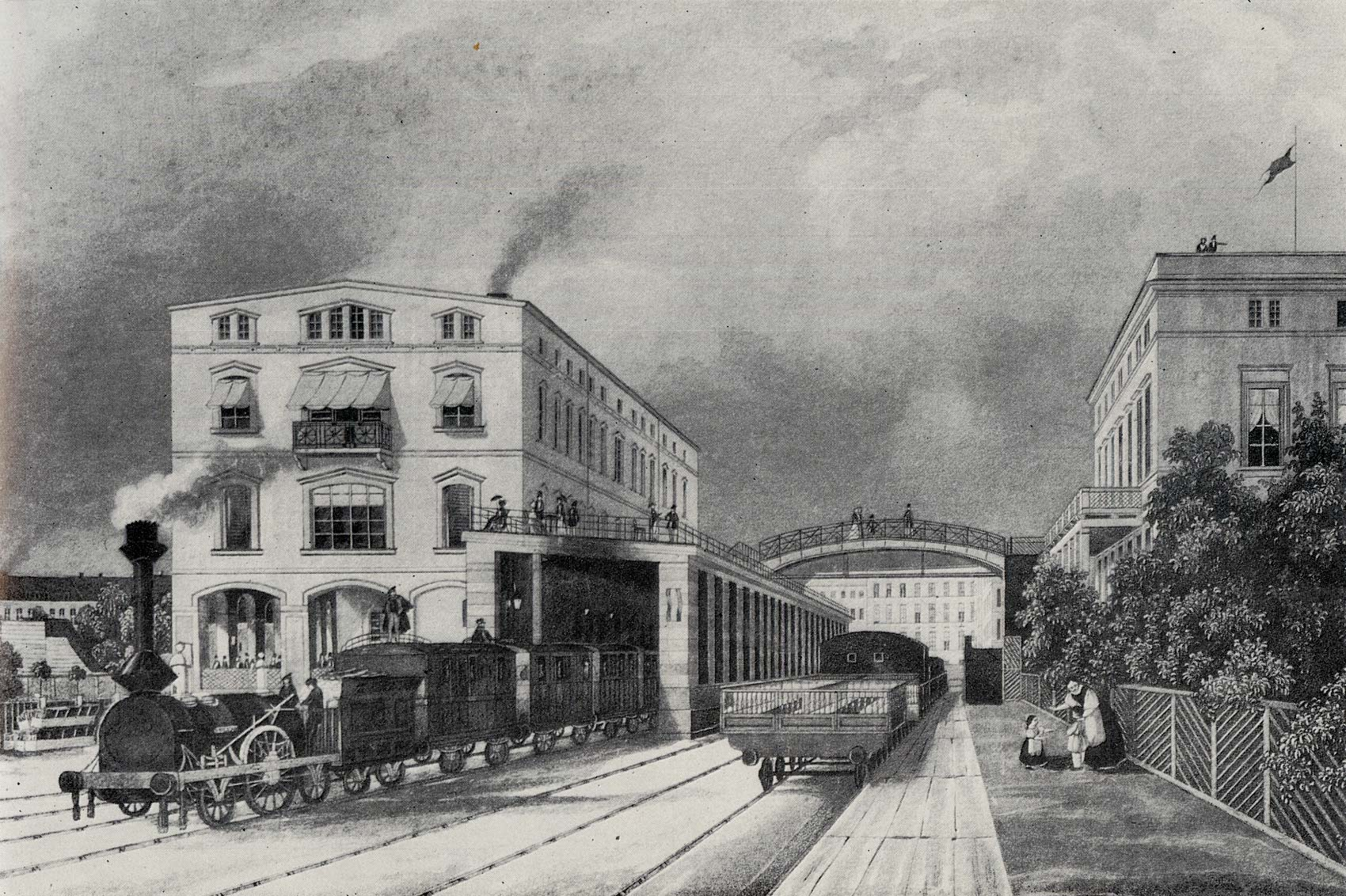
- The original Potsdamer Bahnhof around 1843, a few years after opening

General information
- Location: Mitte, Berlin, Berlin; Germany
- Lines: Prussian Trunk Line (as of 1838); Wannsee Line (as of 1874); Anhalt Suburban Line (as of 1893)

History
- Opened: 29 October 1838; 187 years ago
- Closed: 27 July 1946; 80 years ago
- Rebuilt: 30 August 1872; 153 years ago
- Electrified: Ring 18 April 1929; 97 years ago Wannseenahnhof–Zehlendorf commuter line 15 May 1933; 93 years ago

Key dates
- 1945, February - August 6: operation interrupted
- 1957-1960: ruined buildings removed
Location

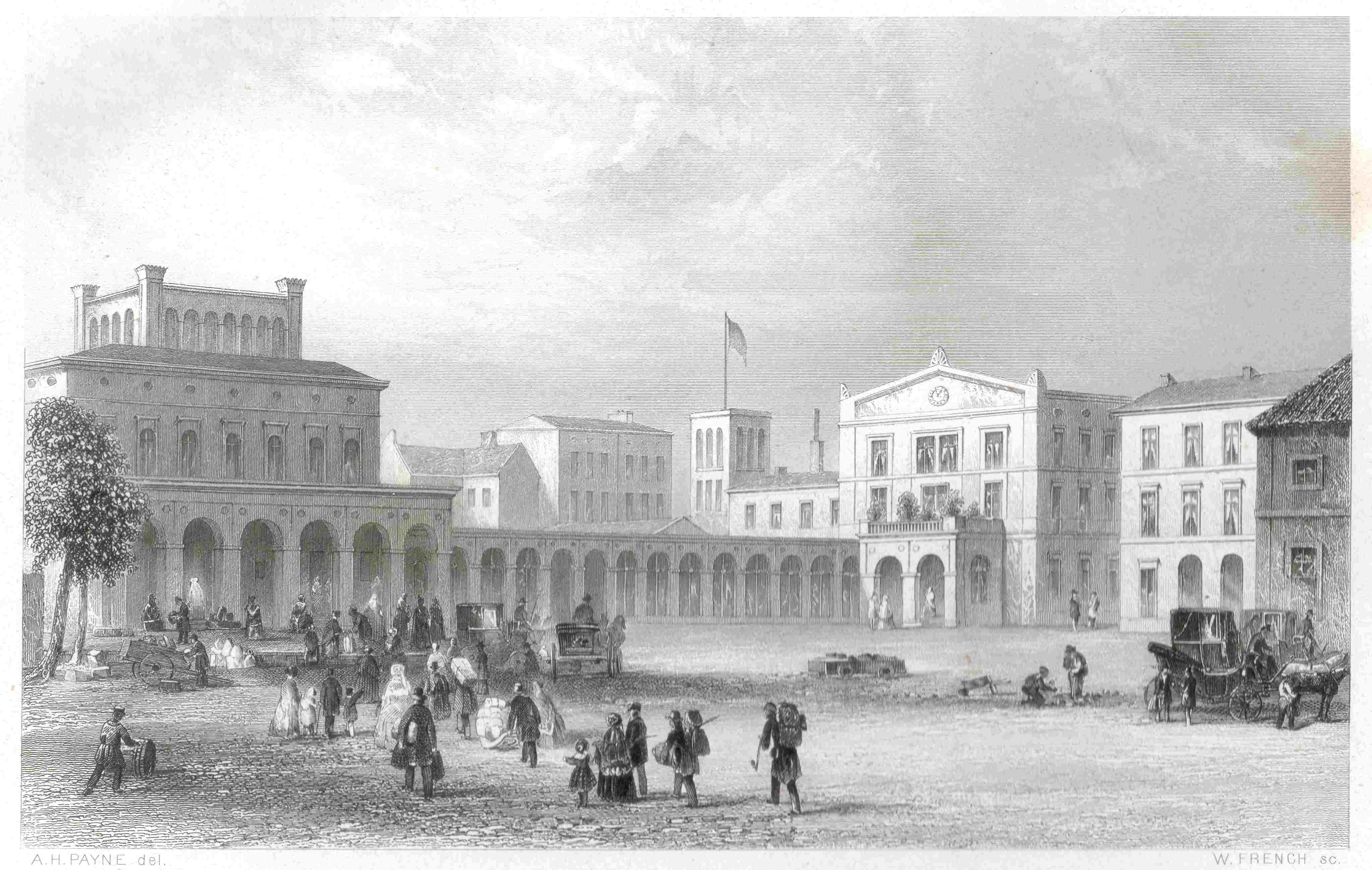
The terminus in 1850, already somewhat larger but even in this form it will eventually become unable to cope with growing traffic

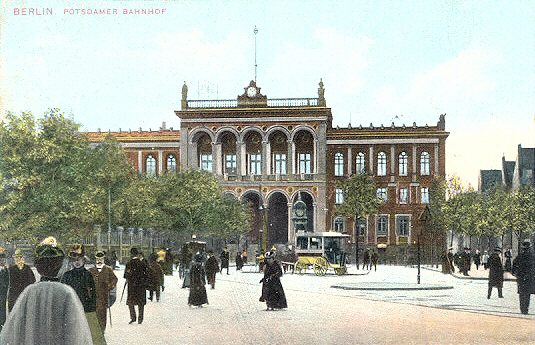
The rebuilt Potsdamer Bahnhof - its new facade around 1900

The Potsdamer Bahnhof is a former railway terminus in Berlin, Germany. It was the first railway station in Berlin, opening in 1838. It was located at Potsdamer Platz, about 1 km south of the Brandenburg Gate, and kick-started the transformation of Potsdamer Platz from an area of quiet villas near the south-east corner of the Tiergarten park into the bustling focal point that it eventually became. For more than a century it was the terminus for long-distance and suburban trains. Also located at this spot were underground stations on the Berlin U-Bahn and S-Bahn, and today's new underground Regionalbahnhof, known as Bahnhof Potsdamer Platz, while the short-lived M-Bahn crossed the site of the former terminus.

== Early days ==
The Potsdamer Bahnhof was the Berlin terminus of the city's first railway, linking it with Potsdam. Begun in 1835, it was opened from the Potsdam end as far as Zehlendorf on 22 September 1838, and its entire length of 26 km on 29 October. The first train was hauled by a British-built locomotive, the work of Robert Stephenson at his Newcastle-upon-Tyne works in 1835, and called Adler (Eagle). In 1848, the lines were extended west to Magdeburg, to link up with routes extending across the future German state. The whole area around the Berlin terminus became a major focus for urban growth after its opening. Five major streets eventually converged here, most having started out as mere rough tracks through the Tiergarten park and adjoining fields.

== A new terminus ==
The first Potsdamer Bahnhof lasted until 1869, when it was superseded by a far grander structure in response to growing traffic, built by Julius Ludwig Quassowski (1824–1909) with five platforms, a trainshed roof that was 173m long and 36m wide, a booking hall with separate waiting rooms and facilities for four classes of ticket holders, and a separate entrance and reception area on the west side for visiting royalty. Opened on 30 August 1872, it eventually handled train services to and from Cologne, Paris, Frankfurt/Main, Strasbourg and Aix en Provence. By 1890 over 3 million people a year were using it, and it was holding its own against a larger rival down the road (the Anhalter Bahnhof).

== Ringbahnhof and Wannsee Bahnhof ==
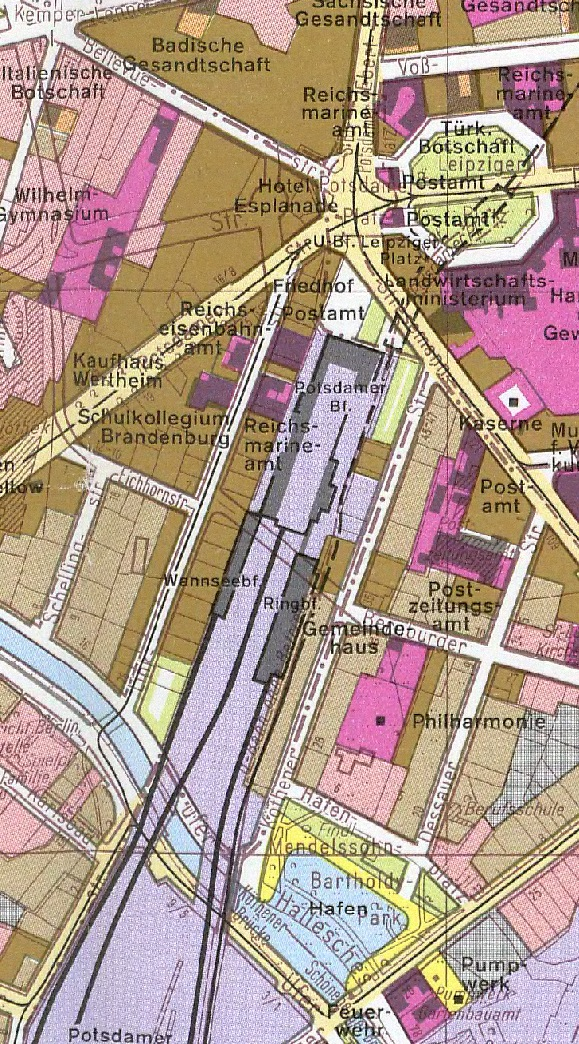
Location of the main station and its Wannseebahn and Ringbahn appendices in 1910, shadowed with the situation of 1980–85

Still the facilities could not cope, and so in 1890–1891 two additional termini were built on either side of it for short-haul and suburban traffic: on the east side, the Ringbahnhof, opened on 1 April 1891 to serve the Ringbahn itself, the circular route skirting the city's perimeter with connections to all the main termini and open throughout its length since 15 November 1877; and the Wannsee Bahnhof on the west side, opened on 1 October 1891 for trains to Wannsee and the south western suburbs. Both these stations were located further south, with the north entries just north of the line Bernburger Straße.

In 1901, separate tracks for the suburban line along the Anhalter Bahn to Lichterfelde-Ost were built together with a number of new stations. The Berlin city terminus was moved from the Anhalter Bahnhof to the Potsdam Ringbahn station. This line was the first Berlin suburban line to be electrified with Third Rail, opened on 2 July 1903. Originally using 550 V DC, it was converted to 800 V in April 1929, in the course of the "Grand Electrification" of the core of Berlin's city, Ring, and suburban lines.

The lines terminating in the Potsdamer Bahnhof Wannsee station and the mainline terminus had to wait until 15 May 1933 to be electrified. The Ringbahnhof ultimately handled many times as many passengers as the mainline terminus.

== 1930s heyday ==
Although smaller than the Anhalter Bahnhof, the Potsdamer Bahnhof was much the busier of the two. By 1939, up to 83,000 people per day were using it, actually making it the busiest station in Berlin by a considerable distance. Since most of these were specifically using the Ringbahnhof, it gave the impression that the entire terminus was simply a suburban or commuter station handling exclusively short haul services, yet the main line services, including those to Paris and other French destinations, were definitely still running. The previous year, the terminus, together with the line from Potsdam, had reached its centenary, and the celebrations featured an operational replica of the "Adler" locomotive that had hauled the very first train 100 years previously (the original loco had been scrapped at Augsburg in 1857). The replica was the work of the DRG restoration workshop at Kaiserslautern in 1935. In 1939, the Wannsee Bahnhof on the west side closed, superseded by the new S-Bahn North-South Link described below.

== World War II and its aftermath ==
The fate of the Potsdamer Bahnhof was determined by World War II, and yet even if the war had not occurred, major changes would still have taken place. Under the grand plan by Adolf Hitler, to transform Berlin into the Welthauptstadt (World Capital) Germania, to be realised by Albert Speer, the building would have ceased to be a railway terminus. The new North-South Axis, the linchpin of the plan, would have severed its approach tracks, leaving the terminus stranded on the wrong side of it. All trains arriving in Berlin would have run into either of two vast new stations located on the Ringbahn to the north and south of the centre respectively, to be known as Nordbahnhof (North Station) and Südbahnhof (South Station), located at Wedding and Südkreuz. The intended use of the Potsdamer Bahnhof has not been documented. In any event, things took a very different course.

During World War II the terminus, like most of Berlin, was devastated by Royal Air Force and US Air Force bombs and Soviet artillery shells. Despite some rubble clearance and emergency repairs, damage to rail infrastructure further out was so great that the mainline terminus never saw another train, it and the Ringbahnhof finally closed on 3 August 1944.

Shortly after the war's end the Ringbahnhof received a reprieve of sorts, temporarily reopening on 6 August 1945 as terminus of the Wannseebahn trains, while the U-Bahn and S-Bahn received extensive repairs, beginning with pumping out thousands of tonnes of water. The Ringbahnhof closed for good on 27 July 1946 after some fragmentary train workings had resumed along the U-Bahn and North-South Tunnel on 2 June. The services were extended further in 1951.

Potsdamer Bahnhof had a unique location in post-war Berlin. Located in the so-called lower Friedrichsvorstadt the Potsdamer Bahnhof became part of the new Kreuzberg borough in 1920. Since a change of borough boundaries in 1938, the boroughs of Tiergarten and Kreuzberg lay on either side of Potsdamer Bahnhof, but the boundary of the borough of Mitte skirted around the site of Potsdamer Bahnhof, so it formed a long thin rectangle within Mitte extending as a salient south from the rest of Mitte towards, and just over, the Landwehr Canal. The result was that Potsdamer Bahnhof was in the Soviet Sector of Berlin, which became the de facto capital of East Germany, while the approach track and neighbourhood to the East were in the American Sector of Berlin, and the neighbourhood to the West in the British Sector.

As a terminus within East Berlin, but with its approach tracks coming through West Berlin, as with the Stettiner Bahnhof, the Deutsche Reichsbahn were not particularly anxious to restore many services to the station.

Another interruption of services was caused by the Uprising of 1953 in East Germany, no trains running between 17 June, the day of the uprising, and 9 July. Above ground, the remains of the terminus were cleared away in stages between 1957 and 1960 after a vague attempt at restoration was aborted. Besides the Dresdner and Hamburger Bahnhöfe (which were not operating by the time of WWII) all of Berlin's other rail termini suffered a similar fate, leaving a network that remained fragmented and inconvenient for decades, exacerbated by the Division of Berlin and the building of the Berlin Wall in 1961 (see below).

The building of the Berlin Wall had a further impact. The now-derelict site of the station would have required two or more kilometres of wall to surround an unused area of 8.5-hectares. The East German regime decided to leave the site of the Potsdamer Bahnhof outside of the wall, although it remained formally and legally part of the Soviet Sector until 21 December 1971, when East Germany were paid DM 31 million for this piece of land as part of a wider land swap. By contrast, the route of the S-Bahn through the Berlin Nord-Süd Tunnel having been re-opened, as described above, crossed under the Berlin Wall between Anhalter Bahnhof and the Potsdamer Platz S-Bahn station, so the Potsdamer Platz S-Bahn station closed, like the other stations in East Berlin on the North-South line (apart from Friedrichstraße). Trains that were now only for use in West Berlin travelled between Anhalter Bahnhof via Friedrichstraße without stopping, and then on to Humboldthain. The Potsdamer Platz S-Bahn station remained closed until 1 March 1992.

The building of the Berlin Wall and the closure of Potsdamer Platz S-Bahn station left the area to the West of the site of the Potsdamer Bahnhof a long way from rapid transport networks. West Berlin's purchase of the site from the East opened an opportunity to solve that problem, and trains, of a sort, returned to the site of the station, since a part of Tiergarten quarter, in the shape of the short-lived M-Bahn, which crossed the site. However, the purpose of the M-Bahn disappeared with the fall of the Wall, and it was quickly dismantled and removed, since the trackbed at Gleisdreieck was an obstruction to re-unifying the ends of the U2 Underground line, which since re-instatement has also effectively replaced the M-Bahn.

== The Potsdamer Bahnhof site today ==
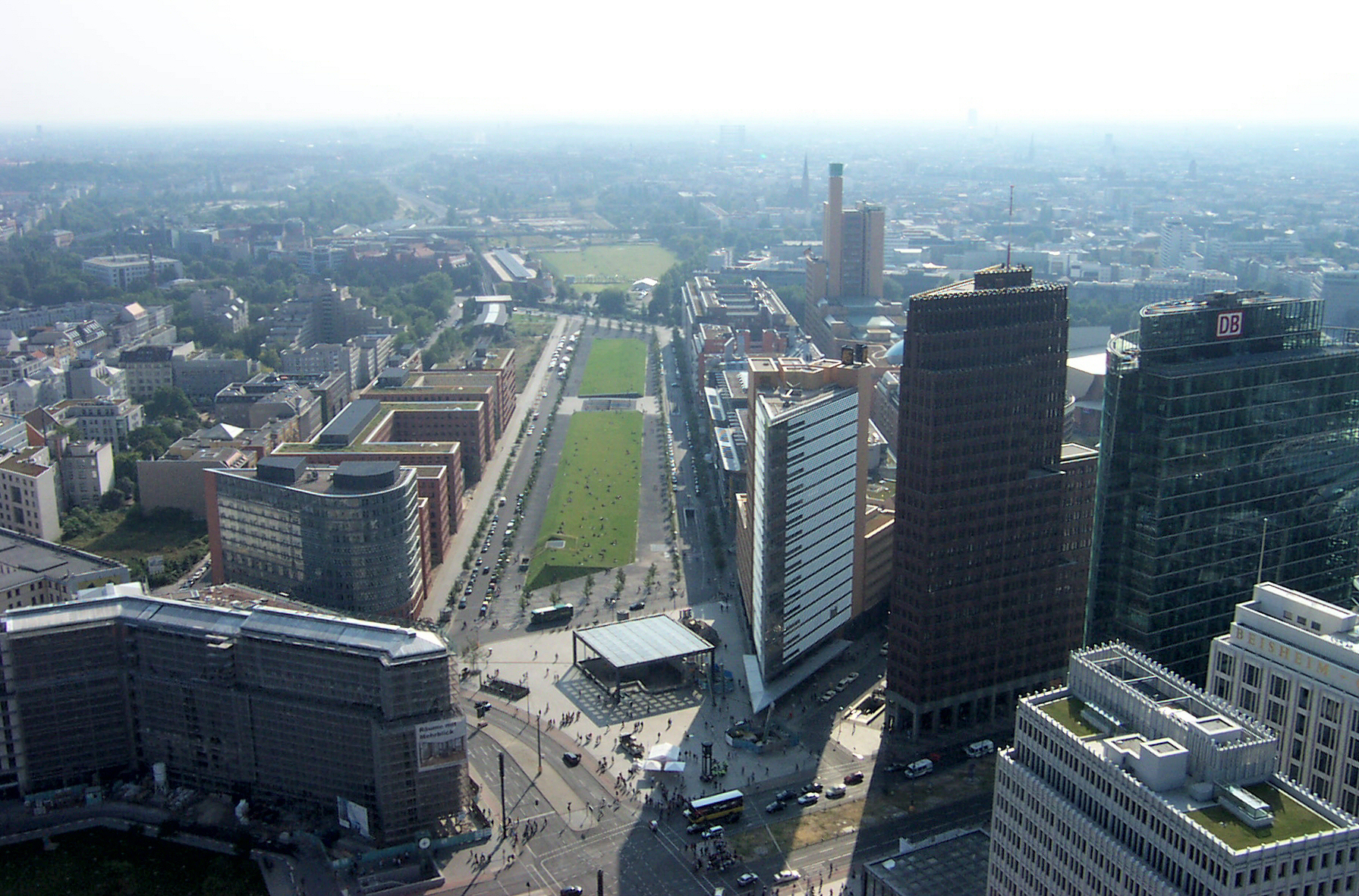
Potsdamer Platz with the site of the Potsdamer Bahnhof in September 2005. The long green strip is Tilla Durieux Park, the site of the former station and its approaches. The road running down its left (eastern) side is Gabriele Tergit Promenade, named after the German writer and journalist Gabriele Tergit (1894-1982), while the road running down the right (west) side is Linkstraße, a bygone thoroughfare from former times now resurrected, but realigned a few metres east of its old route

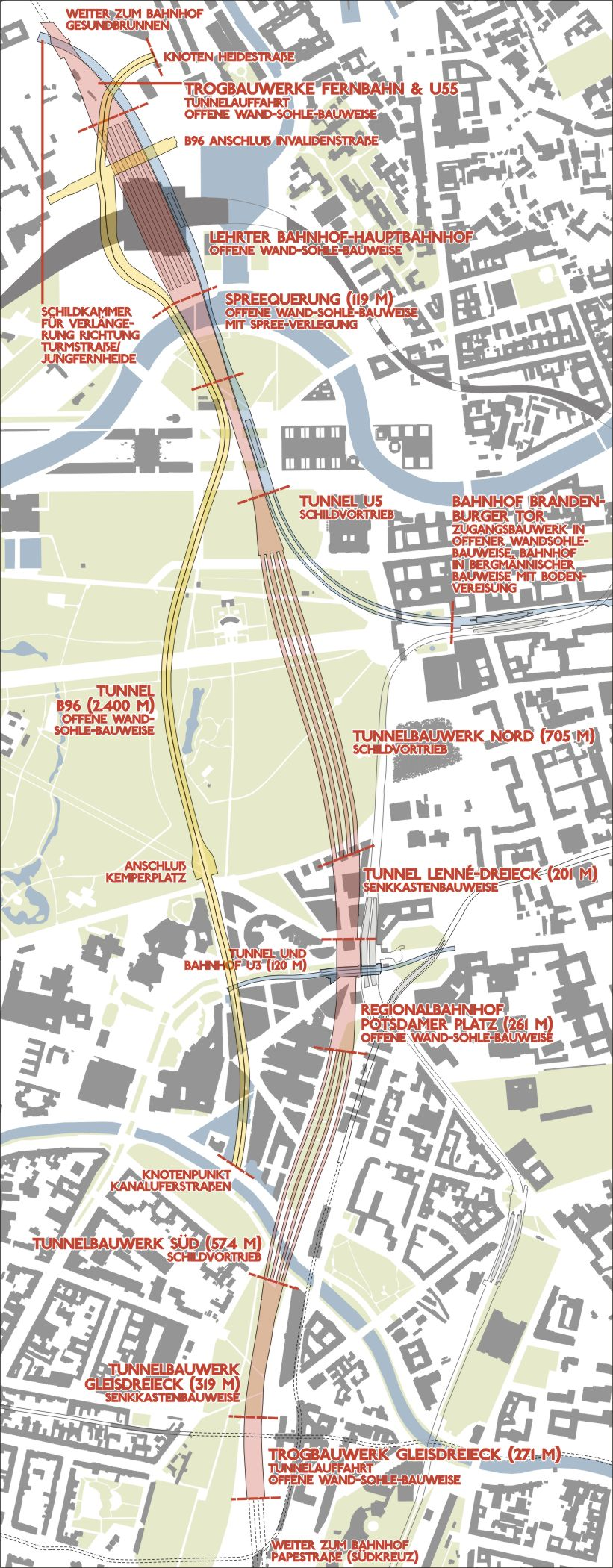
Plan of the Berlin North–South mainline. The site of Potsdamer Bahnhof is in the bottom third of plan, on the route of the (new) main line, while the site of another former station Anhalter Bahnhof is almost parallel parkland, but further towards the South Eastern corner of the plan

Today, a number of vast new developments can be seen around Potsdamer Platz. Despite some initial reservations, the new quarter has become a commercial success, and a must-see for the majority of visitors to Berlin. Where the Potsdamer Bahnhof once stood is a long landscaped strip of land named after the Austrian actress Tilla Durieux (1880–1971), stretching for 450 m down to the Landwehrkanal.

Despite appearances on the surface, long-distance trains have returned to the site, since the Berlin North–South mainline runs under the site of the Potsdamer Bahnhof, with the Potsdamer Platz station extending under some of the site of the Potsdamer Bahnhof.

A major fire at the DB Museum (German State Railway Museum) in Nuremberg on the night of 17/18 October 2005 destroyed a historical shed and 25 locomotives including the Adler replica featured in the centenary celebrations for the Potsdamer Bahnhof in 1938. Deutsche Bahn have apparently ordered another operational replica in time for the 175th anniversary celebrations in 2010, for the Nuremberg - Fürth railway line, Germany's first.

== See also ==
- Berlin Potsdamer Platz station
