= Berlin Nord-Süd Tunnel =

Berlin metropolitan railway line

Nord-Süd-Tunnel
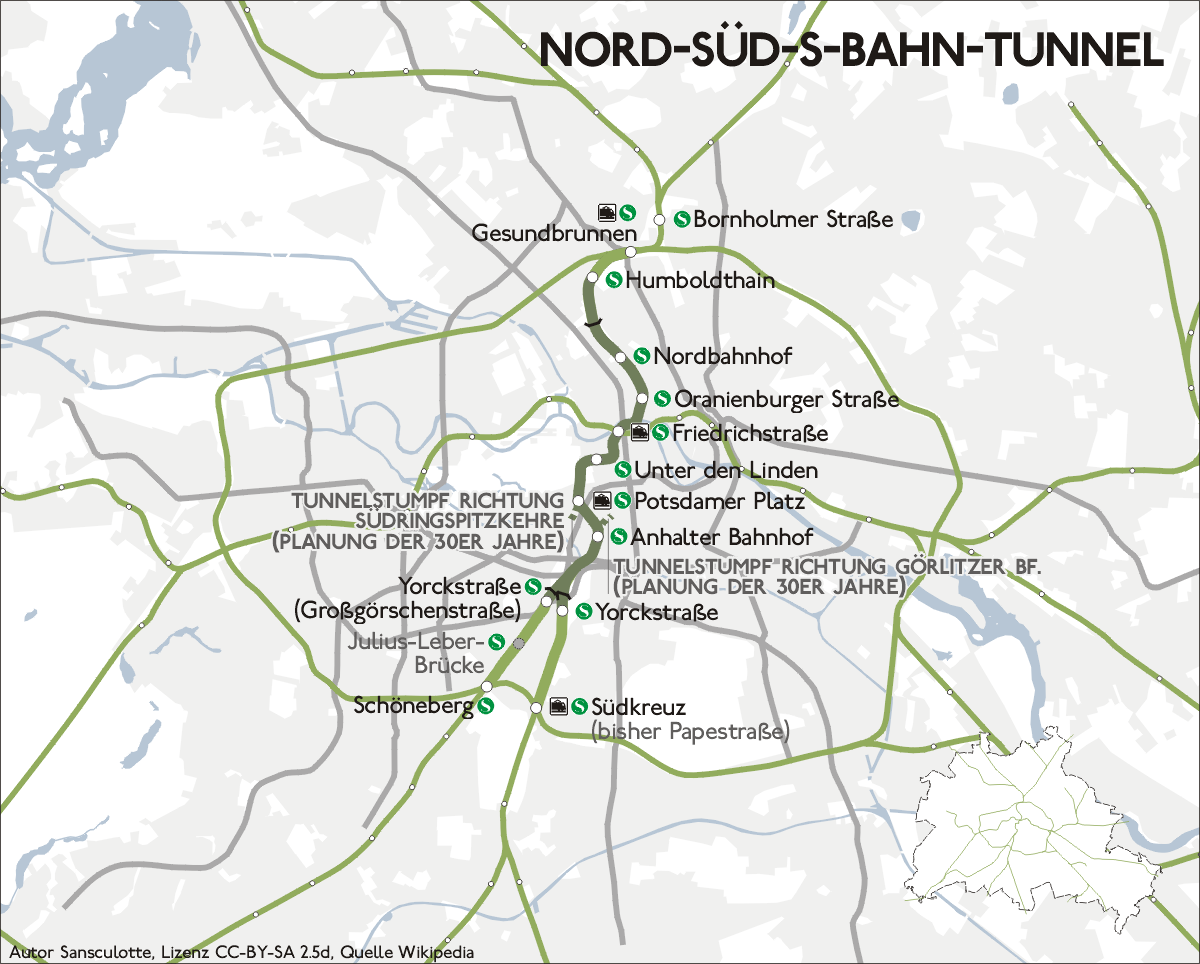

The North–South S-Bahn Tunnel (German: Nord-Süd-Tunnel) is the central section of the North–South transversal Berlin S-Bahn connection crossing the city centre. It is not to be confused with the Tunnel Nord-Süd-Fernbahn, the central tunnel part of the North–South main line used by intercity and regional trains. The S-Bahn North–South line encompasses the route from Bornholmer Straße and Gesundbrunnen via Friedrichstraße and Anhalter Bahnhof to Papestraße (today Südkreuz) and Schöneberg.

The North–South S-Bahn Tunnel has a limited profile (loading gauge - G2) with a height of 3.83 metres (12 ft 7 in) above the trackhead and a width of 3.43 metres (11 ft 3 in).

== Function ==
This tunnel originally provided an S-Bahn connection from the former mainline stations of Anhalter Bahnhof and Potsdamer Bahnhof with the interchange for the east–west Stadtbahn at Friedrichstraße and on to the Stettiner Bahnhof (today: Nordbahnhof). The tunnel connects three southerly suburban lines (the Wannsee Railway from Wannsee, the Anhalt Suburban Line from Teltow Stadt and the Dresden line from Blankenfelde) with three northerly suburban lines (the Kremmen Railway from Hennigsdorf, the Northern Railway from Oranienburg and the Stettiner Bahn from Bernau).

== History ==
The idea of a north–south cross-town railway emerged not long after the completion of the east–west cross-town railway called the Stadtbahn ("City Railway") in 1882. The construction of an elevated line like the Stadtbahn was ruled out because of extensive building along the route, and a tunnel would have been highly problematic in the steam age.

By the end of the 19th century, Siemens proposed an underground line similar to the lines that later became what is today called the U-Bahn, connecting the Wannsee substation of the Potsdamer Bahnhof to the then Stettiner Bahnhof. In 1911, within the framework of a much broader competition for proposals for the further development of the city of Berlin, several proposals for such a north–south railway interconnection were set forth. The discussion was revived in the 1920s after the First World War. The advent of electrification made a tunnel solution possible.

The work was finally begun in 1933 as one of the public works undertaken by the new National Socialist government to put the unemployed to work. The decision was taken in 1933, plans were made, and the first stones were moved in 1934.

=== Building ===
Because of the number of underground lines to be crossed, the need to pass under rivers and streams meant that tight curves, small-profile tunnels and steeper inclines than normal were incorporated into the planning parameters.

Building commenced in 1934 with the construction of the new stations Bornholmer Straße north of the S-Bahn Ring and Humboldthain inside the Ring between Berlin Gesundbrunnen and the then still existing Stettiner Bahnhof.

The tunnel section from north of the Stettiner Bahnhof to the new station Unter den Linden was opened on 28 May 1936, just in time for the 1936 Berlin Olympics, despite the collapse of a section of the tunnelling work near the Brandenburger Tor (adjacent to the American Embassy) on August 20, 1935, killing 19 workers.

This stretch was extended to the new underground Potsdamer Platz station in April 1939, and the connection to the Southern suburban lines via Anhalter Bahnhof was opened on 9 October 1939.

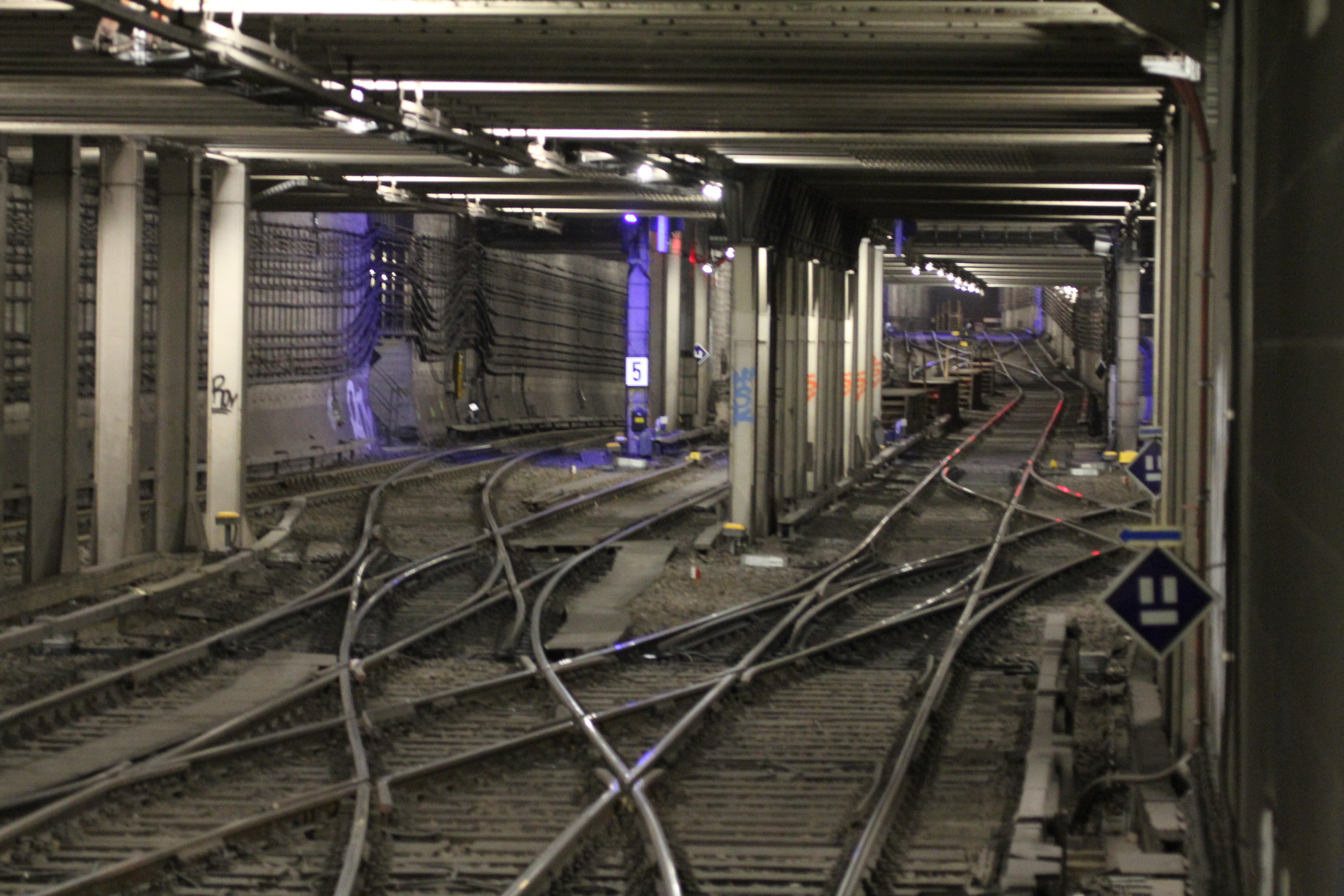
Tunnel just north of Potsdamer Platz station with the reversal and staging yard in the centre

The construction of the Southern section was marred by a number of planning changes. The original plan, as it stood in 1936, was to introduce the Ringbahn, which branched to the Potsdamer Bahnhof (actually the Potsdamer Ring- und Vorortbahn adjacent to the Potsdamer Bahnhof) into the underground Potsdamer Platz station separately from the three southern suburban lines, and into the two centre tracks, after driving the Ringbahn branch into the underground at about the same location of the then Potsdamer Ring- und Vorortbahnhof serving the Ringbahn branch and the two suburban lines on the Anhalter and Dresden railway lines. Those Ringbahn trains would reverse in a staging area north of the underground Potsdamer Platz station, which was designed as the upper level of the two-floor tunnel underneath the north–south street formerly and later called Ebertstraße but back then Hermann-Göring-Straße. This two-level design was chosen out of the scarcity of space, and in order to allow a later extension to the then Lehrter Bahnhof and its suburban lines to Nauen and Wustermark.

This stabling and reversal yard with its inherent possibility of extension north could be used as part of the S21 line to the new Berlin Hauptbahnhof, then on to the northern section of the Ringbahn.

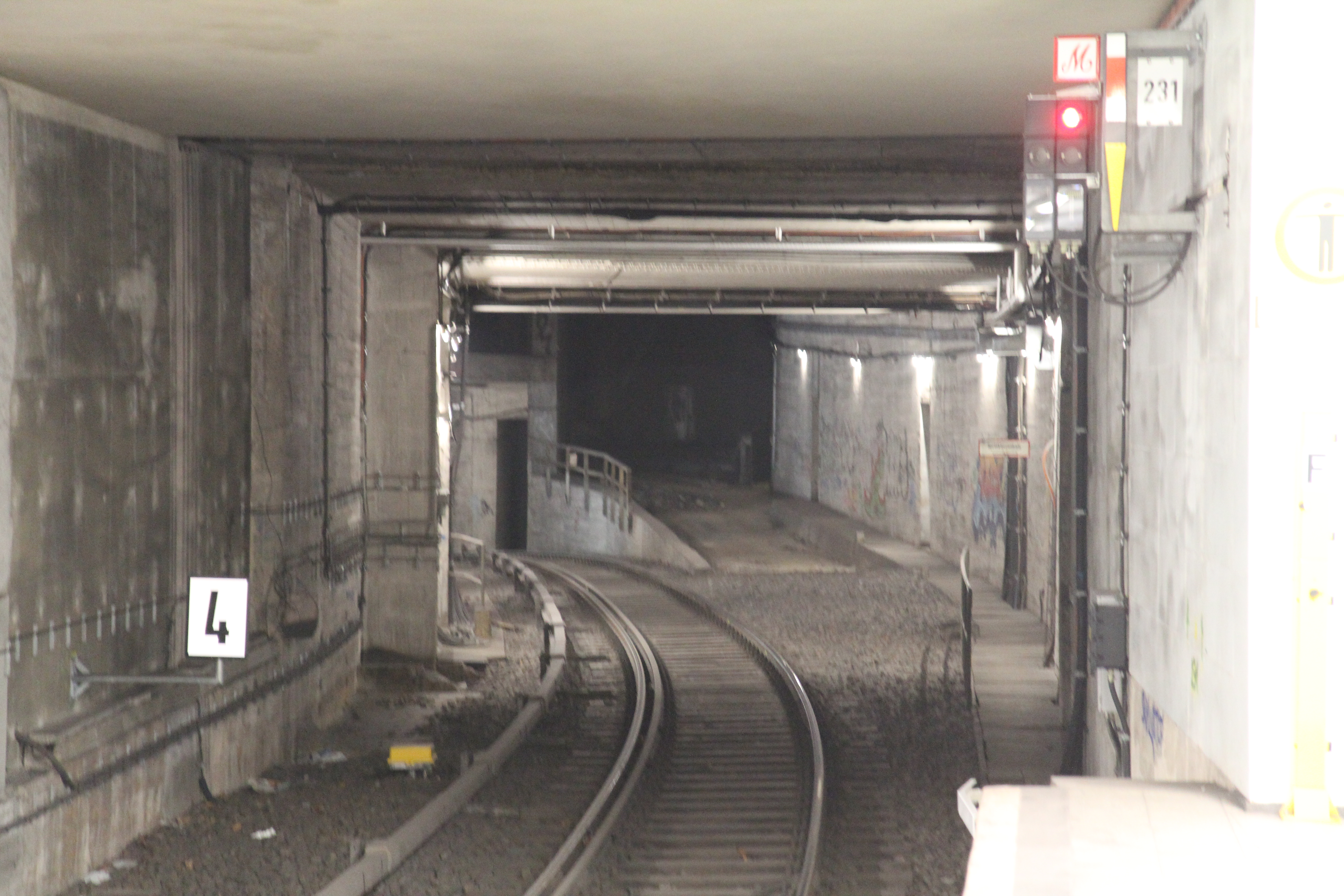
Tunnel just south of Potsdamer Platz station with the unused ramp for the Ringbahn branch connection

The original plan also envisaged uniting the Wannseebahn and the Ringbahn branch by converting the Kolonnenstraße station serving the Ringbahn branch to an interchange station between the Ringbahn branch and the Wannseebahn, and the construction of a new station just south of the Landwehrkanal as a replacement for the Potsdamer Ring- and Vorortbahnhof which moved north into the Potsdamer Platz underground station.

Owing to the planning for the transformation of the Reichshauptstadt the plan for this curve was not realised. Instead, spurs for a junction to Anhalter Bahnhof were built with the plan for a further underground section to Görlitzer Bahnhof and, south of the Landwehr Canal, four tunnel spurs taking the North–South Line to the planned S-Bahn station Hornstraße.

But all further construction was halted by the war which Hitler began a few weeks before the Grand Opening of the complete North-South S-Bahn line.

=== Flooding ===
(see also History of the Berlin U-Bahn#World War II)

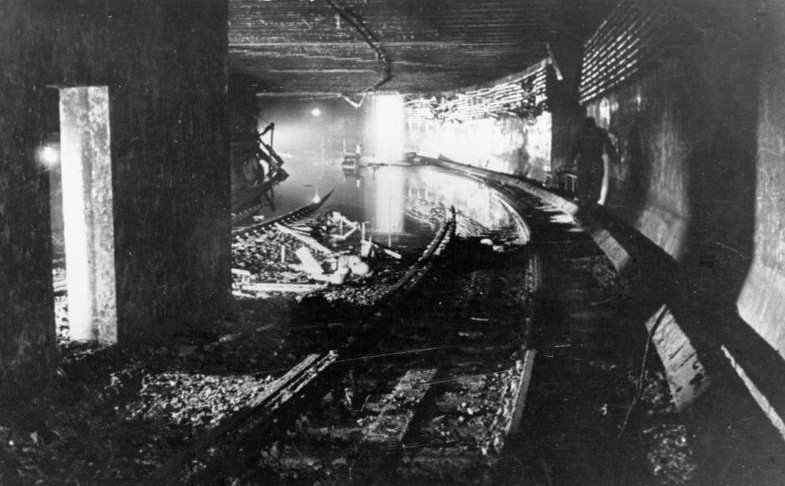
Flooded North–South Tunnel 1946

Shortly before the end of the Second World War on 2 May 1945, there was a detonation of explosives under the Landwehrkanal. As a result, the entire tunnel and (via a connecting tunnel at Friedrichstraße) part of the Berlin U-Bahn, and S-Bahn were inundated. There are few other examples in the history of Berlin that have produced so much conflicting information. It is debatable whether people were drowned during the flooding, because it is possible these drownings were confused with the 80 to 130 bodies of victims of the last days of the war, who died before the tunnel was flooded. Also debatable (and to this day also unclear) is who actually demolished the tunnel and who had ordered it. In order to cause such an explosion, a very good knowledge of the area and buildings would be required. One theory states that the explosion was undertaken by members of the SS. There are few eyewitnesses who can actually verify this. Rather they report that in the last days of the war the tunnel was already partially flooded with fresh and sewage water that was leaking from damaged pipes.

=== Restoration ===
Although the repairs were begun immediately after 1945, the tunnel could not be used again until 1947. The S-Bahn lines of the southerly suburban lines first had to be taken back to the overground Potsdamer Bahnhof before, in 1946, it was possible to use the underground line to Anhalter Bahnhof again.

=== Division of Berlin ===
With the building of the Berlin Wall in 1961 all the stations in East Berlin were shut, except for Friedrichstraße which was used as a border crossing point. Trains that were now only for use in West Berlin travelled between Anhalter Bahnhof via Friedrichstraße to Humboldthain without stopping. On the evening of 8 January 1984, operation of the section was handed over to the Berliner Verkehrsbetriebe (BVG). The restoration of traffic through the tunnel restarted in May of that year. No works were allowed to be carried out on the Nord-Süd Tunnel during the division of Berlin.

=== Reunification ===
The Berlin Nord-Süd Tunnel had been heavily renovated three times, twice during the time of East German rule, and with the installation of a new signalling system in the later phase. When the Berlin Wall was opened and destroyed in 1990, discussions were ongoing to reopen all the Berlin Nord-Süd Tunnel stations in March 1990 together with the U6 and U8. However, Oranienburger Straße, Nordbahnhof and Unter den Linden stations began the modernisation programme to remove armed guards and out-of-bounds signage, and to do thorough cleanup work, with Oranienburger Straße reopening on 2 July 1990, while Nordbahnhof, together with Unter den Linden reopened on 1 September 1990.

Bornholmer Straße, a station that straddled the former "sector boundary" (between East and West Berlin), reopened on 22 December 1990, and there were no checkpoint and armed guards before then. The eastern part was opened fully in March 1991.

The first comprehensive renovation since 1945 started from January 1991 in subsections, but was converted in mid-1991 to a complete closure due to the high levels of dust. The Deutsche Reichsbahn replaced almost all the material in the tunnel walls, then cleaned and recoated them. Hence the wartime flood damage to the tunnel was finally removed. This was finally achieved on 1 March 1992 when Potsdamer Platz was reopened. The border controls were abolished on 23 July 1990. During the refurbishment of Potsdamer Platz, opaque glass panels were installed, but other errors have been committed: the station labels differ from the Tannenberg Fraktur of the originals, and the letters of the platform-side walls are convex rather than sunk into the shallow etched-glass panels. The original pattern can be seen at the Berlin S-Bahn Museum.

Another renovation began in February 2002 and ended in October 2002, which removed all the last traces of East Berlin.

The building of the new heavy-rail tunnel to the Hauptbahnhof and the connected electromagnetic effects of the overhead wiring meant that a new compatible signalling system had to be installed. This work was undertaken between July 2005 and May 2006. The North–South Line was the last section of the Berlin S-Bahn network to have the automatic Block signalling of type AB 37 and Sv-Signals with aperture relay installed.

== Specification ==
In order for the tunnel to follow the roadway in the heavily built-up city centre, the tightest curve in the North–South Tunnel is only 150 metres (490 ft). To operate the trains safely, this required a special profile to be developed for the wheels. The BVG encountered several derailments of its stock, which had only a standard wheel profile. The permissible height in the tunnel is also restricted. Therefore, trains of class ET 169, which are longer and taller than typical Berlin S-Bahn stock, are also banned from the tunnel. The restrictions in carriage height and length continue to limit the trains that can be used, with only rolling stock specially developed for the Berlin S-Bahn (as of April 2026 consist of classes 270/485, 480, 481/482 and 483/484) allowed to use the tunnel. In particular, trains constructed for other cities cannot be used for the DC S-Bahn system of Berlin.

== Stations ==
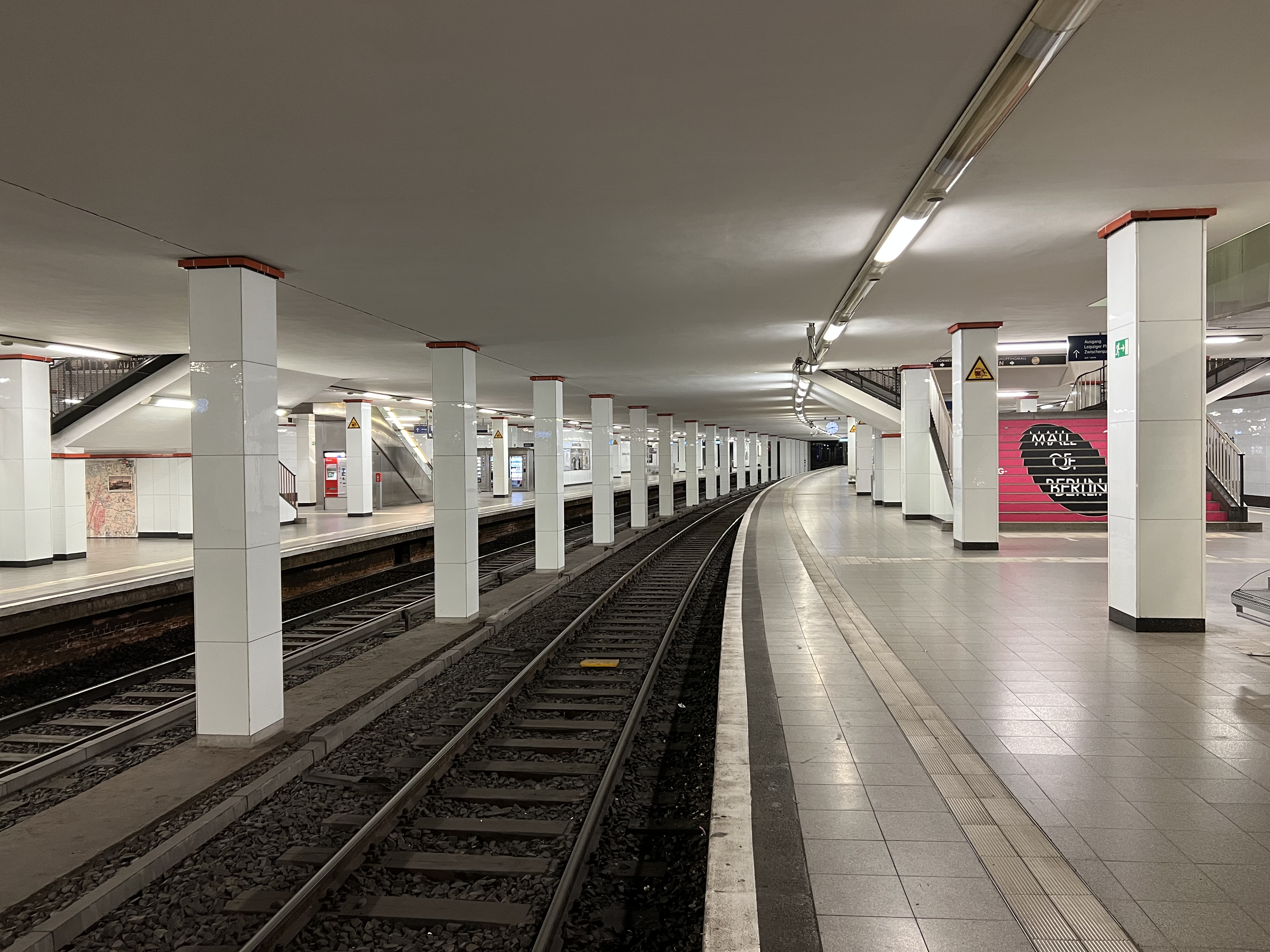
S-Bahnhof Potsdamer Platz

From north to south:

Station	Notes
Humboldthain	above ground but opened at the same time as the tunnel section
north tunnel portal	at 52°32′11″N 13°22′53″E
Nordbahnhof	named Stettiner Bahnhof until 1950; the mainline station was closed in 1952 and later demolished
Oranienburger Straße
Friedrichstraße	interchange to the Stadtbahn and U-Bahn (present line U6)
Brandenburger Tor	at Pariser Platz, near the Brandenburg Gate
Berlin Potsdamer	the above-ground mainline station was closed in 1945, replaced by the new Potsdamer Platz station
Anhalter Bahnhof	the above-ground mainline station was closed in 1952 and demolished in 1960, except for the portico
south portal, Wannsee line	at 52°29′44″N 13°22′18.5″E; S-Bahn line S1
south portal, Anhalt line/Dresden line	at 52°29′43″N 13°22′21″E; lines S2 and S25

The present modern Yorckstraße and Yorckstraße (Großgörschenstraße) are two different stations, a few hundred metres apart, with separate entrances, although they are today collectively known as Yorckstraße with the Yorckstraße U-Bahn line U7 station oriented east–west between them.

The architect of most of the stations in the North–South tunnel is Richard Brademann, specifically: Bornholmer Straße, Humboldthain, Oranienburger Straße (Brademann's first S-Bahn Underground station), Unter den Linden, Potsdamer Platz and Anhalter Bahnhof. Stettiner S-Bahnhof had Lüttich as its architect; Friedrichstraße had von Hane. Although they were built in the middle of the National Socialist period, the stations have none of the architecture of National Socialism, rather the officially taboo New Objectivity of the earlier Modern style. Except in a few details, e.g. the mosaic of the emblem in the northern distribution area of S-Bahnhof Potsdamer Platz, with its exit to the New Reich Chancellery, the stations do not follow typical National Socialist Architecture.

The stations were rehabilitated after the fall of the communist government (the Wende) in the light of conservation issues, but important details were not faithfully restored, e.g. the typical station S-Bahn sign outside the station, designed by Richard Brademann, never matched the original. Closest to the original S-Bahn sign are the ones at Anhalter Bahnhof (although instead of the cast iron cutout in the shape of the S-Bahn "S", today they only have a backlit glass screen). During the renovation of Anhalter Bahnhof, the BVG (on behalf of the Senate Construction Administration) attempted to restore the original look of the station and placed enamelled tin plates on the walls. However, in contrast to the original white opaque glass panels, the new ones have completely different light reflections, and instead of white, inconspicuous seams between the panels, the seams reveal a black grid. At Potsdamer Platz they have installed opaque glass panels but have committed other errors: the station labels differ from the Tannenberg Fraktur of the originals, and the letters of the platform-side walls are convex rather than set into the shallow etched glass panels. (The original pattern can be seen at the Berlin S-Bahn-Museum.) There are also signs in the Helvetica font which was until recently used by Deutsche Bahn. During construction of the Regional station, the western part of the distribution hall between the surface and platforms has been cut off. More modern fixtures have also destroyed the original spatial effect.

Since 8 August 2009, in connection with the opening of the interchange with the new U55 line, Unter den Linden has been renamed Brandenburger Tor, although the original name tiles remain on the station walls.

== Planning and development (S21) ==
Planned S21
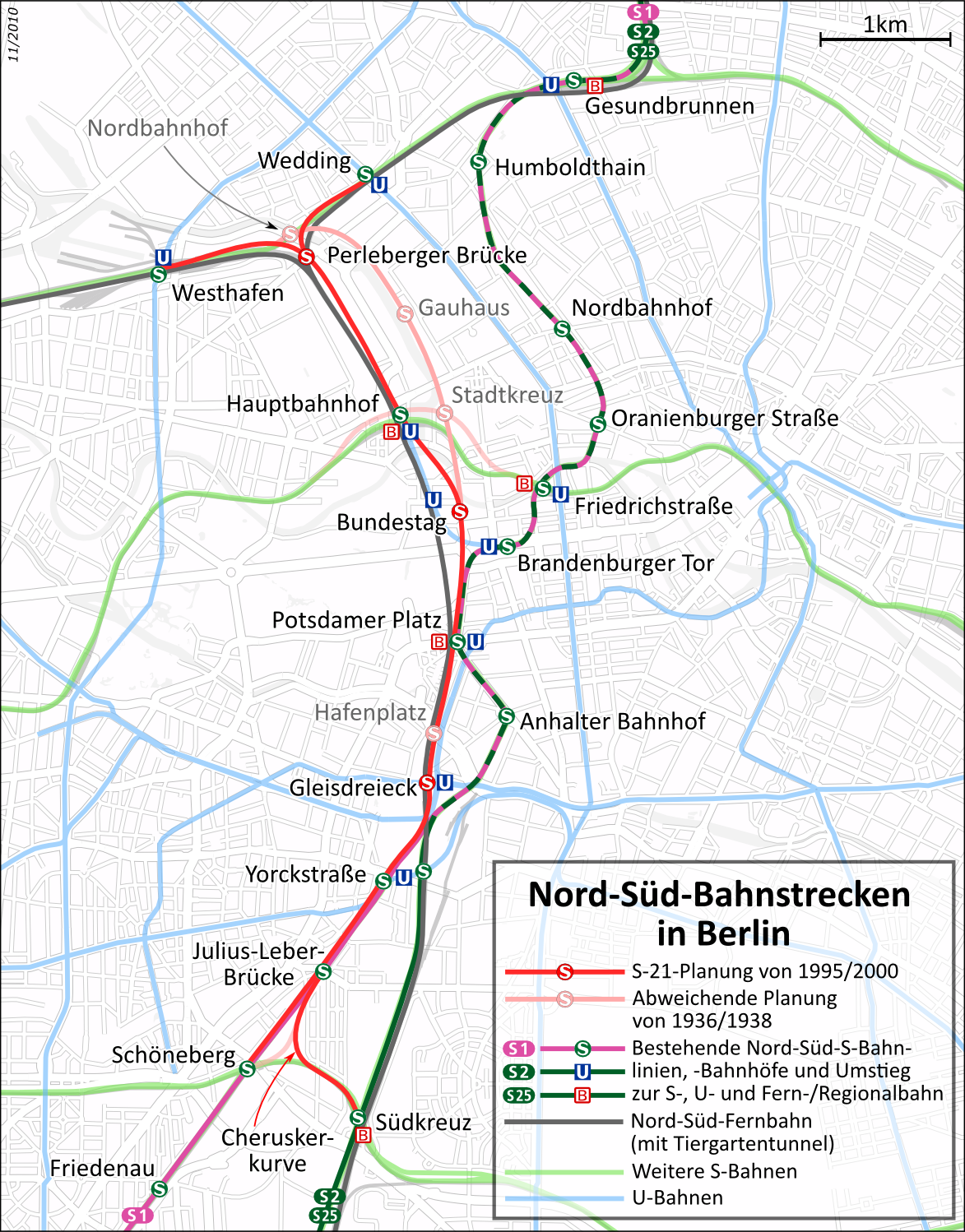

Overview
- Line number: 6017 Westhafen–Hbf–Potsdamer Platz; 6019 Wedding–Hauptbahnhof
- Locale: Berlin

Technical
- Track gauge: 1,435 mm (4 ft 8 1/2 in) standard gauge
- Electrification: 750 V third rail (under-running)

In the medium term the north–south connections will be improved with a second north–south tunnel, connecting in a first phase the Hauptbahnhof with Potsdamer Bahnhof. This project is being pursued under the planning name of S21 and should improve the currently poor connection of the new Berlin Hauptbahnhof with the North–South S-Bahn line.

This project will proceed in the following stages:

- In the first stage the new section, will divert between the stations of Wedding and Westhafen to Hauptbahnhof. A possible new station at Perleberger Brücke (Berlin Perleberger Brücke station) was considered but is not in current plans. This section will allow trains from the Ringbahn and trains from the northerly suburban lines to connect to the Hauptbahnhof. Underpasses under the Ringbahn had already been built during the reconstruction of the Nordring, the northern section of the Ringbahn. This line runs above-ground, only diving down in a tunnel north of the Minna-Cauer-Straße. The Hauptbahnhof station lies east of the U-Bahn station Hauptbahnhof. Completion was initially planned for 2017 but has been postponed to 2022.
- In the second building stage the line will cross the Spree river, pass along the eastern side of the Reichstag building with a possible station there, connecting the upper level of the two-floor tunnel under the Ebertstraße, which was built in 1935 to the existing station at Potsdamer Platz. originally built in 1935/36 only as reversing and siding tracks for the Ringbahn-trains introduced into the Potsdamer Platz station. This would allow one of the trains running through the existing North–South Tunnel via the new connection to the Hauptbahnhof and further on to the northern section of the Ring and beyond. This second section is planned for completion in 2023.
- A third section that exists in the thinking of the planners would see a new north–south connection from Potsdamer Platz via a new interchange station at Gleisdreieck (Berlin U-Bahn) and onwards towards Berlin Yorckstraße station (Großgörschenstraße), and interchange at Julius-Leber-Brücke station with the Wannseebahn. This section would use the exits at the southern end of the underground Potsdamer Platz station, originally built in 1935/36 for the Ringbahn trains to terminate underground at Potsdamer Platz instead of further south at the Ringbahn station next to the Potsdamer Bahnhof.

The additional usage of this section is limited as there is already a connection at Potsdamer Platz to the U2 Line and at Gleisdreieck only the U1 would be provided with an additional connection.

- A fourth section would divert from the new north–south connection to the Wannseebahn and then over the reinstated „Cheruskerkurve“ (Südringspitzkehre) to the southerly part of the Ringbahn.

The building work for the northerly section up to the Hauptbahnhof, which will be funded by the German Federal Government via the Community Transport Financing law, costed 24 million Euro. The remaining section should, as envisaged by the financial planning for the Land of Berlin, be built by 2030.

In July 2007, Deutsche Bahn announced delays in the construction of the first stage. After they had concluded the financial agreement and thereby delayed the under-signing of the project, the building work would start in 2008, rather than at the end of 2007 as planned.

Some preparatory work has already been completed, including the diversions at the Ringbahn stations of Westhafen and Wedding, the preservation of the route during the building of the Hauptbahnhof and the Tiergartentunnel, along which the new line will run. To the south of the Hauptbahnhof the line will continue easterly of the Reichstag building and then crossing the U55 to the west of Brandenburger Tor where it will join the old North–South Tunnel. South of Potsdamer Platz the new line will divert from the old North–South Tunnel and run parallel to the U2 to Gleisdreieck before connect to the existing S-Bahn line at Yorckstraße (Großgörschenstraße). Connections at the north and south ends of Potsdamer Platz station already exist.

== See also ==
- S-Bahn Berlin, Stadtbahn, Ringbahn
- Geisterbahnhöfe
