= Berlin Oranienburger Straße station =

Railway station in Berlin, Germany

Oranienburger Straße
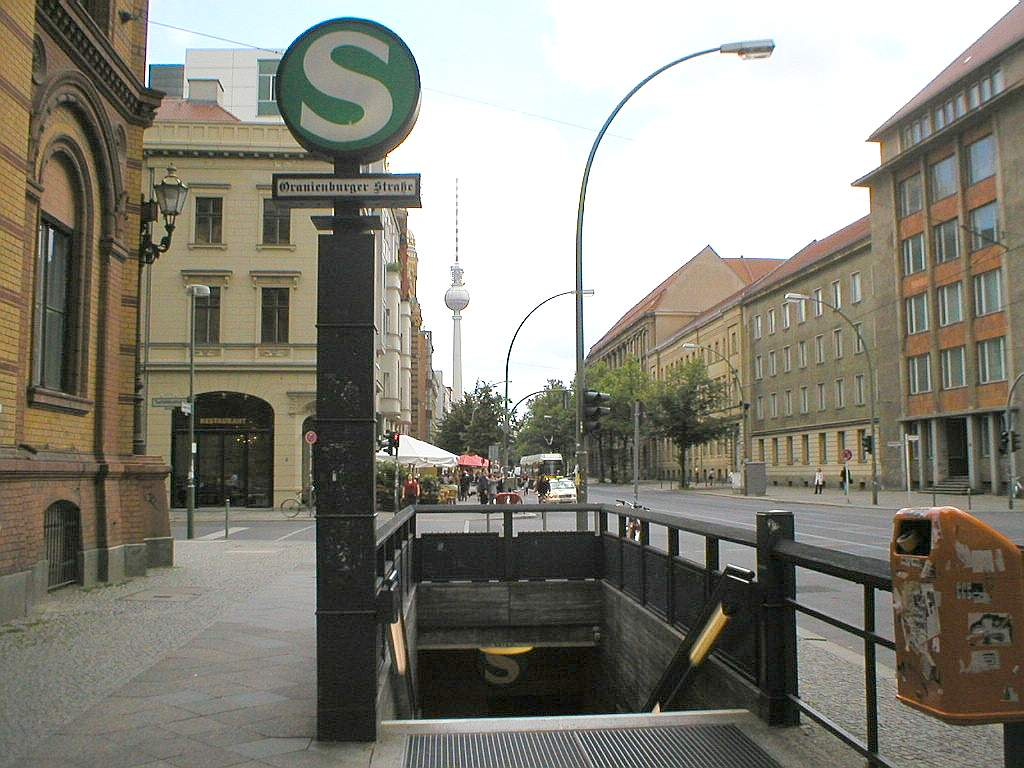

General information
- Location: Berlin, Berlin; Germany
- Coordinates: 52°31′30″N 13°23′34″E
- Line: Berlin Nord-Süd Tunnel
- Platforms: 1 island platform
- Tracks: 2

Construction
- Structure type: Underground

Other information
- Station code: 4778
- DS100 code: BORS
- Category: 4
- Fare zone: VBB: Berlin A/5555
- Website: www.bahnhof.de

Key dates
- July 27, 1936: opened
- April 25, 1945: closed (Battle of Berlin), subsequently flooded
- November 16, 1947: reopened (war damage removed)
- August 31, 1961: closed (Berlin Wall erected)
- July 2, 1990: reopened

Services
Preceding station	Berlin S-Bahn	Following station
Nordbahnhof towards Oranienburg	S1	Friedrichstraße towards Wannsee
Nordbahnhof towards Bernau	S2	Friedrichstraße towards Blankenfelde
Nordbahnhof towards Hennigsdorf	S25	Friedrichstraße towards Teltow Stadt
Nordbahnhof towards Blankenburg	S26	Friedrichstraße towards Teltow Stadt
Location

Berlin Oranienburger Straße (in German Bahnhof Berlin Oranienburger Straße) is a railway station in the city of Berlin, Germany, located on Oranienburger Straße. It is served by the Berlin S-Bahn and local tram lines.

== History ==
On 27 July 1936 the station was opened as part of the new North-South Tunnel. On 25 April 1945 the S-Bahn ceased operation due to the Soviet invasion, which had reached Berlin on 21 April. Most likely on 2 May 1945 the SS exploded the tunnel ceiling under Landwehrkanal, which caused the subsequent flooding of the tunnel, including Oranienburger Straße station. After drainage and repair the station reopened for traffic on 16 November 1947. During the Uprising of 1953 in East Germany and East Berlin the S-Bahn, operated by the eastern Deutsche Reichsbahn, interrupted traffic between 17 June until 9 July 1953.

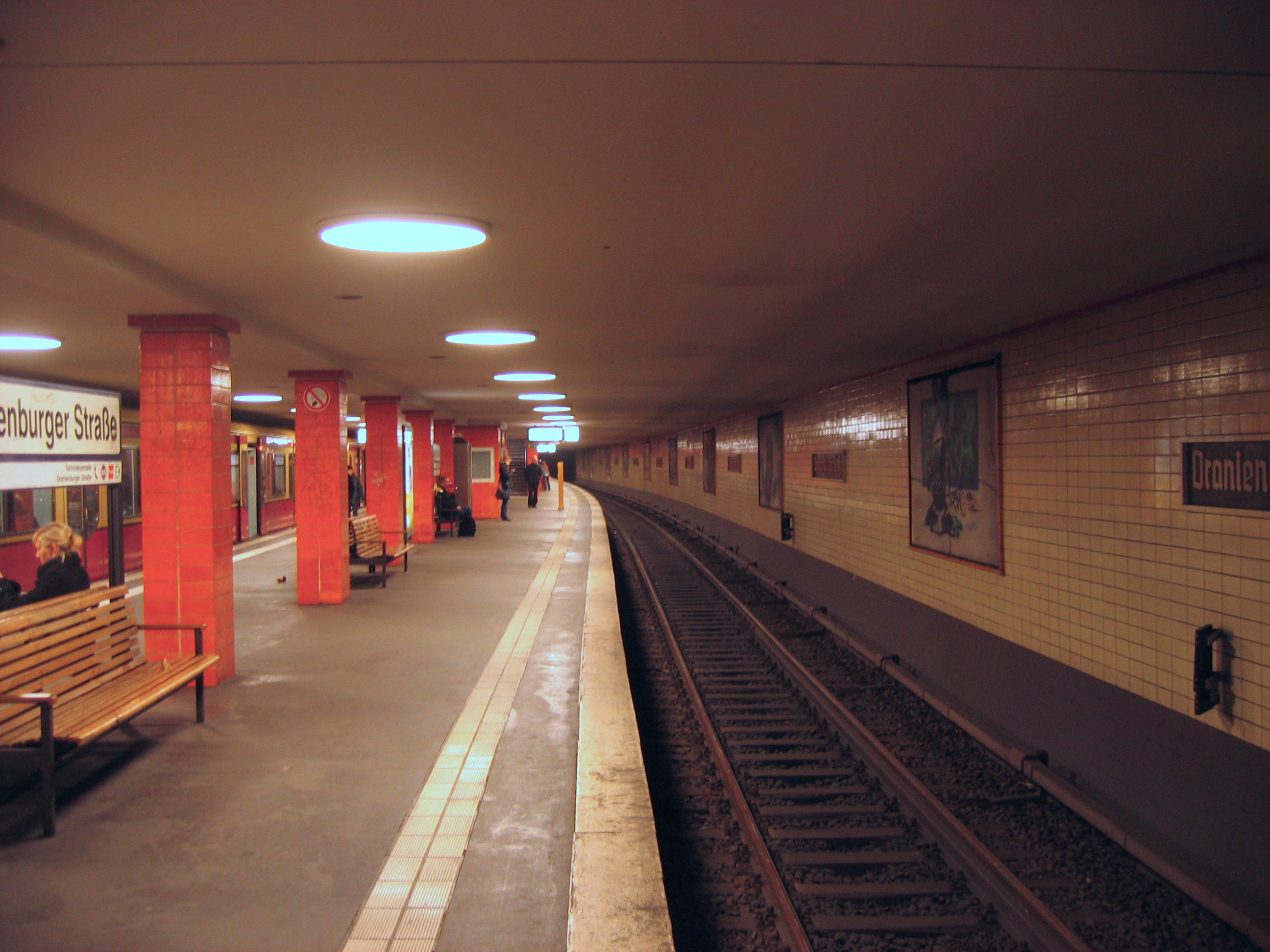
Platform view

From 13 August 1961, the day the Berlin Wall went up, trains did not stop in the station, because it was located in East Berlin, with the operating line, however, connected northern and southern areas of West Berlin. So the Reichsbahn continued the operation of the line, but trains only stopped in those stations with entrances from West Berlin. So Oranienburger Straße was one of East Berlin's ghost stations. After the eastern Reichsbahn handed over operation of the S-Bahn in West Berlin to the latter's public transport operator BVG the S-Bahn line passing the station was abandoned on 9 January 1984. However, protests by West Berlin's users made the BVG reopen the line on 1 May with the trains however only passing. After the downfall of the Wall and still before Berlin's reunification Oranienburger Straße was the first of the ghost stations to be reopened on 2 July 1990.
