= Tilla Durieux Park =

Park in Berlin, Germany

Coordinates: 52.5063°N 13.3751°E

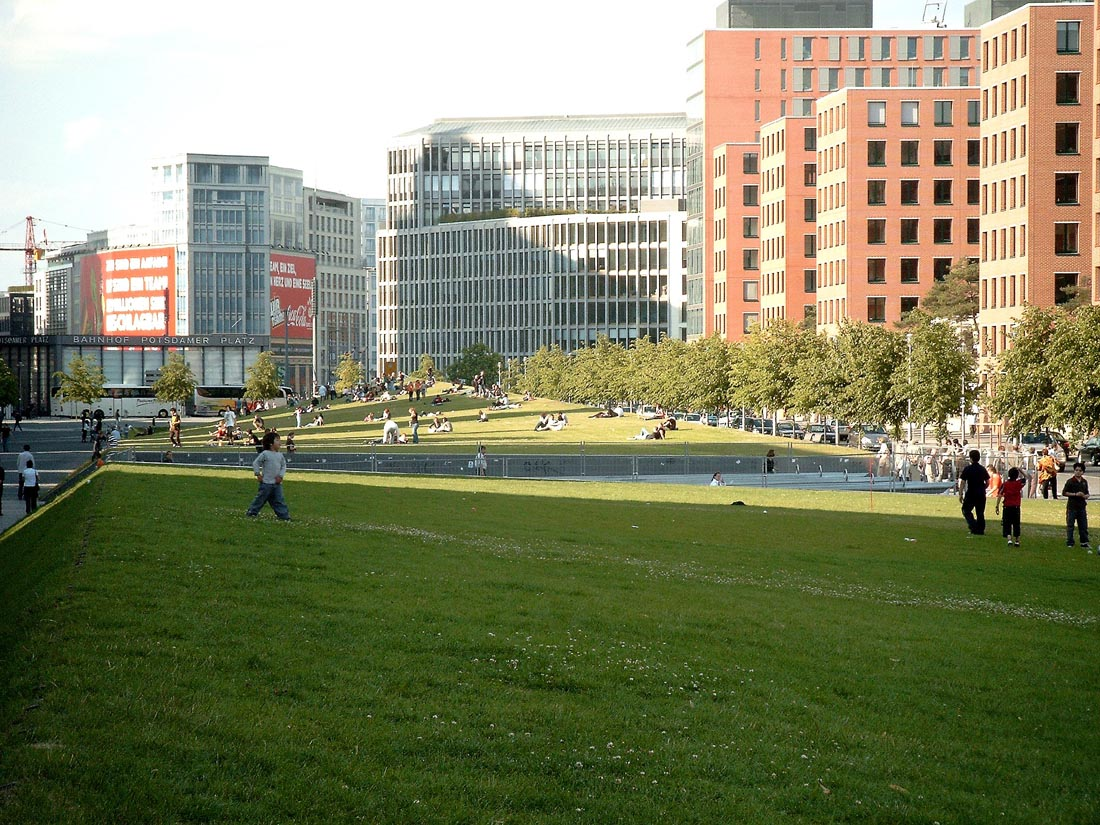
- The park in 2008
- Interactive map of Tilla Durieux Park
- Location: Berlin, Germany

Tilla Durieux Park (German: Tilla-Durieux-Park) is a park near Potsdamer Platz in Berlin, Germany. The park is named after the Austrian actress Tilla Durieux.

The park is located on lands formerly occupied by the Berlin Potsdamer Bahnhof railway.
