= Berlin Old Nordbahnhof =

Passenger railway terminus in Berlin, Germany

Coordinates: 52°32′26.95″N 13°24′13.01″E

Berlin Nordbahnhof (Berlin Nordgüterbahnhof)
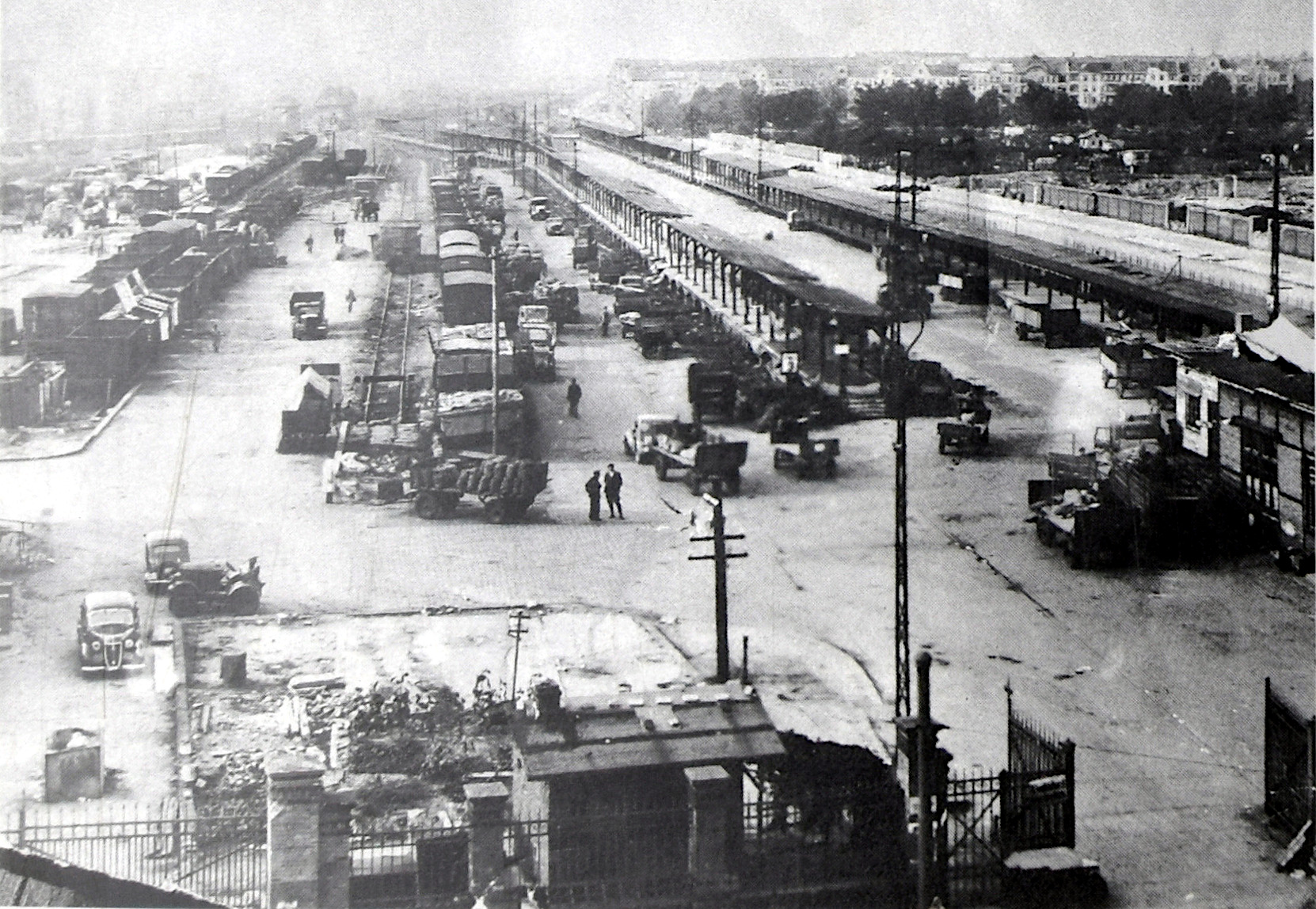
- Nordbahnhof c. 1935. The platform on the right, with the small shack in front of it, was the one used for passengers.

General information
- Location: Pankow, Berlin, Berlin; Germany
Location

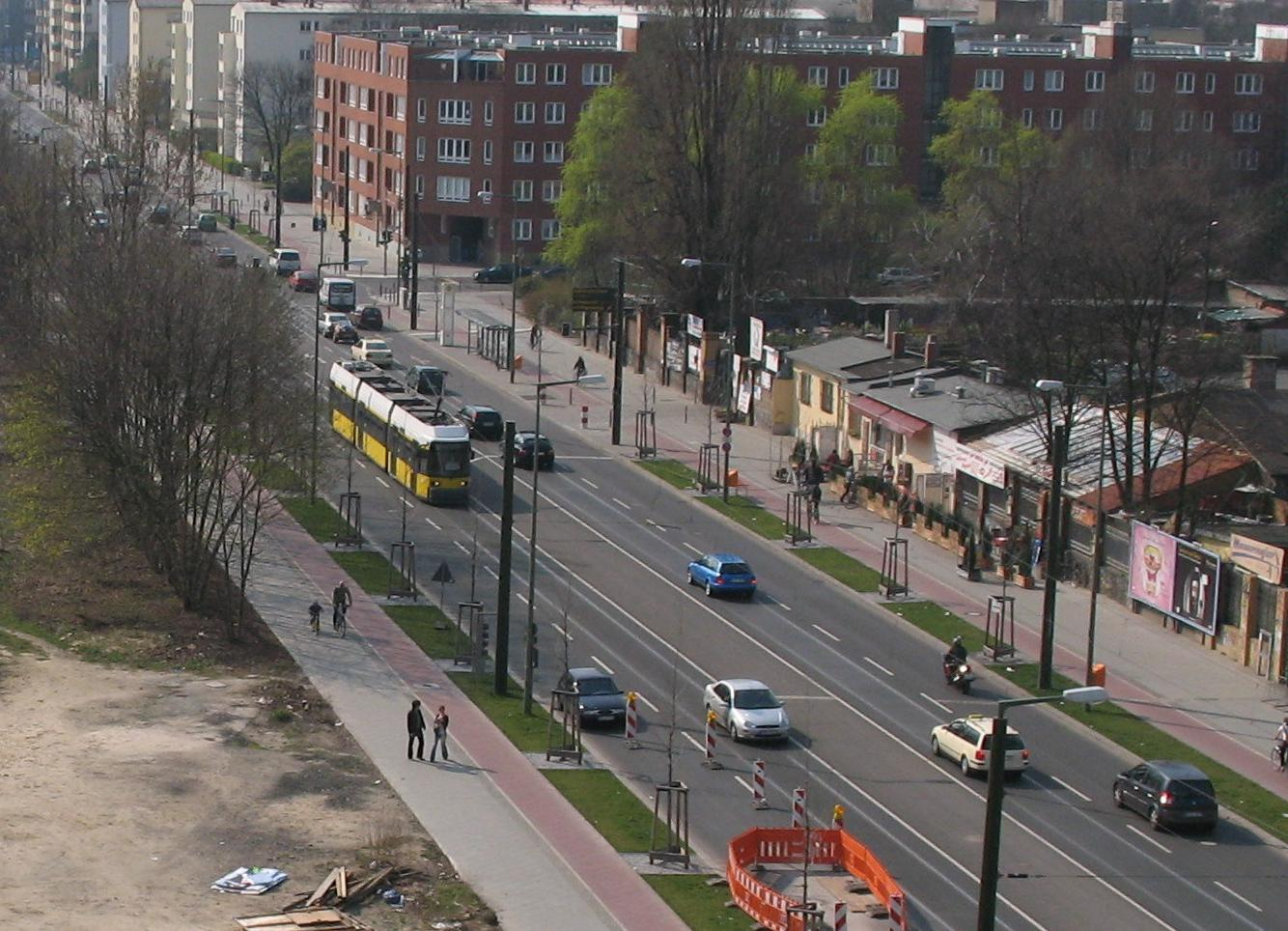
A GT6N tram in 2007 running in Bernauer Straße. The area of the old Nordbahnhof was on the right hand side behind the small houses. The M10 is the only rail line working around the station area.

The old Berlin Nordbahnhof was freight and (for a short period) passenger railway terminus in Berlin, Germany. It was situated in Prenzlauer Berg, close to the borders with Gesundbrunnen, in the area of the "Mauerpark".

== Geography ==
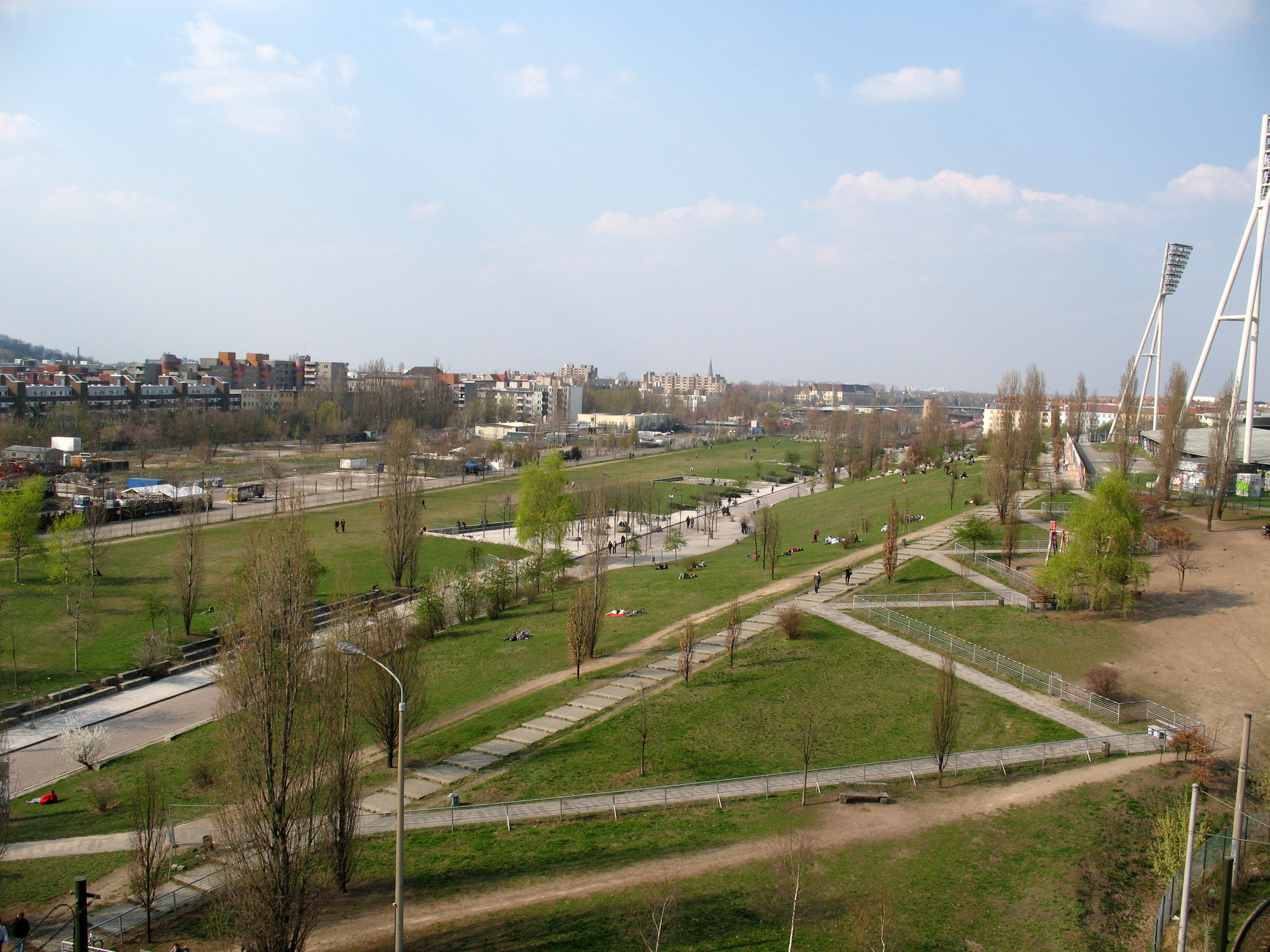
The old Nordbahnhof was situated in the area on the left hand side behind the street.

The station was located at the junction point of Eberswalder Straße with Bernauer Straße, close to the "Friedrich-Ludwig-Jahn-Sportpark". The sportpark's tramway stop (line M10) serves the area.

== History ==
Berlin Nordbahnhof opened on 10 July 1877 as the southern terminus of the Berlin Northern Railway Berlin-Stralsund. The passenger traffic was handled by the nearby Stettiner Bahnhof, located at the western end at Bernauer Straße. The Nordbahnhof was a freight yard only except for the years from 1892 to 1898 when a part of local traffic started from Nordbahnhof instead of Stettiner Bahnhof during construction works there.

In 1950 the Stettiner Bahnhof took the name Nordbahnhof because the city of Stettin went to Poland and GDR government did not want to use German names for Polish cities. The old Nordbahnhof was renamed to Güterbahnhof (freight yard) Eberswalder Straße. After the building of the Berlin Wall, in 1961, only a small part of local freight traffic remained. It was finally closed in 1985. After 2000 a large fraction of the area became part of the Mauerpark.

Nowadays the ground where the station's tracks were located is the seat of the Mauerpark, a commemorative park about the Berlin Wall on the former "death strip" nearby Bernauer Straße. Some years before the renewal of Gesundbrunnen station (2006) it was possible to see some remains of the tracks, now removed, from the Ringbahn, between Gesundbrunnen and Schönhauser Allee station.

== See also ==
- Berlin Nordbahnhof
