= Berlin Nordbahnhof =

Railway station in Berlin, Germany

Coordinates: 52°31′55″N 13°23′16″E

Nordbahnhof
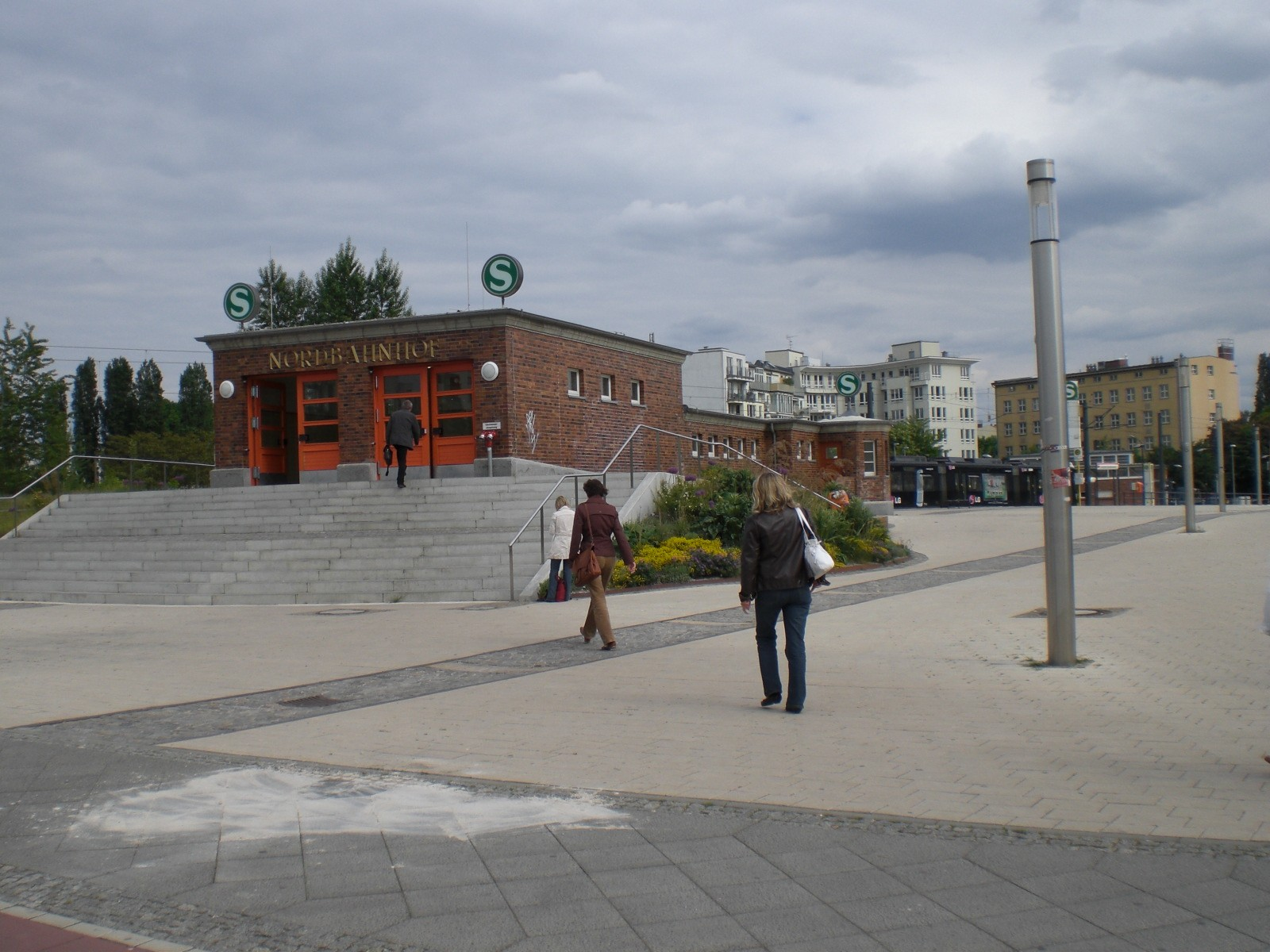
- S-Bahnhof Nordbahnhof

General information
- Location: Mitte, Berlin, Berlin; Germany
- Platforms: 2 island platforms
- Tracks: 4
- Train operators: S-Bahn Berlin
- Connections: S1 S2 S25 S26

Other information
- Station code: 532
- DS100 code: BNB
- IBNR: 8089024
- Category: 4
- Fare zone: VBB: Berlin A/5555
- Website: www.bahnhof.de

History
- Former names: Berlin Stettiner Bahnhof

Services
Preceding station	Berlin S-Bahn	Following station
Humboldthain towards Oranienburg	S1	Oranienburger Straße towards Wannsee
Humboldthain towards Bernau	S2	Oranienburger Straße towards Blankenfelde
Humboldthain towards Hennigsdorf	S25	Oranienburger Straße towards Teltow Stadt
Humboldthain towards Blankenburg	S26	Oranienburger Straße towards Teltow Stadt
Location

Berlin Nordbahnhof (lit. 'Berlin North station') is a railway station in the Mitte district of Berlin, Germany. It is served by the Berlin S-Bahn and local bus and tram lines. Until 1950, the station was known as Stettiner Bahnhof.

== History ==
=== First station ===
In 1842, the Stettiner Bahnhof opened as the terminus of the railway line to the capital of the state of Pomerania, Stettin (Polish: Szczecin (since 1945 a part of Poland). The terminus was built on the previous site of the gallows field on the Invalidenstraße, at some distance from the Hamburg Gate in the Berlin Customs Wall. Initially mainly intended to connect Berlin to Stettin's sea port, the line later also became important for reaching the holiday resorts on the Baltic Sea (so-called Pomerania Riviera or more colloquial Berliners' bath tub). As the number of passengers increased rapidly, the station became one of Berlin's busiest railway termini and had to be enlarged several times.

=== Second station ===
Between 1870 and 1876, an entirely new and much larger terminal building was constructed. From 1877, this also became the Berlin passenger train terminus of the Preußische Nordbahn (Prussian Northern Railway) to Stralsund via Neu-Strelitz, and later also to Rostock. The increasing popularity of the station caused massive traffic problems in the north of the city, because the tracks were laid at street level. It was particularly bad during the summer months when holiday traffic was busy. During the years 1892-1898, some passenger traffic was redirected to the goods station at Eberswalder Straße to ease congestion.

To solve these problems, an extensive renovation and remodeling of the station took place between 1900 and 1903. The rails were lifted above street level to solve the traffic problems, and three smaller halls were added to the east of the main hall: two for holiday traffic to the Baltic coast, and one to handle mail transport. The Stettiner saw more long-distance passengers than any other of the large Berlin terminals; from around 750,000 in 1894 the number had risen to more than 1,2 million in 1937.

=== S-Bahn ===
As part of the renovation, a special suburban station (Vorortbahnhof) was built to the west of the mainline terminal in 1896, serving three suburban lines, to Bernau on the Berlin-Stettin railway, to Oranienburg on the North Railway, and to Velten via Berlin-Tegel on the Kremmen Railway. It is one of the few structures belonging to the complex that survives today, and is used as an event venue.

In 1939, these three suburban lines were paired with the three southern suburban lines to form three transversal lines, by means of the North-South S-Bahn link with a tunnel from Stettiner Bahnhof to Anhalter Bahnhof under the Berlin city centre. As part of opening of the first phase, the northern section, the present-day underground station of the S-Bahn opened on 28 May 1936. The new underground station replaced the former suburban railway station, whose railhead building can still be seen west of the Nordbahnhof on Zinnowitzer Straße. The new, underground, S-Bahn station was located East of the main building, with the tracks crossing from the west to the east under the approaches of the mainline tracks.

=== After World War II ===
During World War II, the station fell victim to heavy bombardment, and the hall burnt down in 1943. On 25 April 1945 the S-Bahn ceased operation due to the Soviet invasion, which had reached Berlin's suburbia on 21 April. Most likely on 2 May 1945 the SS exploded the tunnel ceiling under Landwehrkanal, which caused the subsequent flooding of the tunnel. After World War II the station itself was within the Soviet sector (East Berlin). After drainage and repair the tunnel and its stations reopened for traffic in November 1947.

On 1 December 1950, the name of the formerly German town of Stettin was deleted by a renaming into Berlin Nordbahnhof. Since the rail lines leading to the station crossed the territories of West Berlin, it was closed by the GDR authorities on 18 May 1952 and had been demolished by 1962. The adjacent S-Bahn station remained under the name of Nordbahnhof. During the Uprising of 1953 in East Germany and East Berlin the S-Bahn, operated by the eastern Deutsche Reichsbahn, interrupted traffic between 17 June and 9 July 1953.

Between 13 August 1961, the day the Berlin Wall went up, and 1 September 1990 trains did not stop at the station, because it was located in East Berlin. Nevertheless, the Reichsbahn continued to operate the line to connect the stations in the northern and southern areas of West Berlin. Trains only stopped in the stations with entrances in West Berlin, and when they passed through the East Berlin stations passengers viewed from the train windows the empty and barely lit platforms of so-called ghost stations, where time had stood still since 13 August 1961.

All entrances were closed until the station reopened on 1 September 1990. Soon after, the station closed again for extensive refurbishment lasting one and a half years. The tunnel and station reopened on 1 March 1992. The Nordbahnhof entrance hall was restored in 2006, including a new layout of the forecourt with indicated tracks and inset plaques bearing the destinations of the former trains to the Baltic coast and an exhibition near the platforms describing the era of the "ghost stations".

== Gallery ==
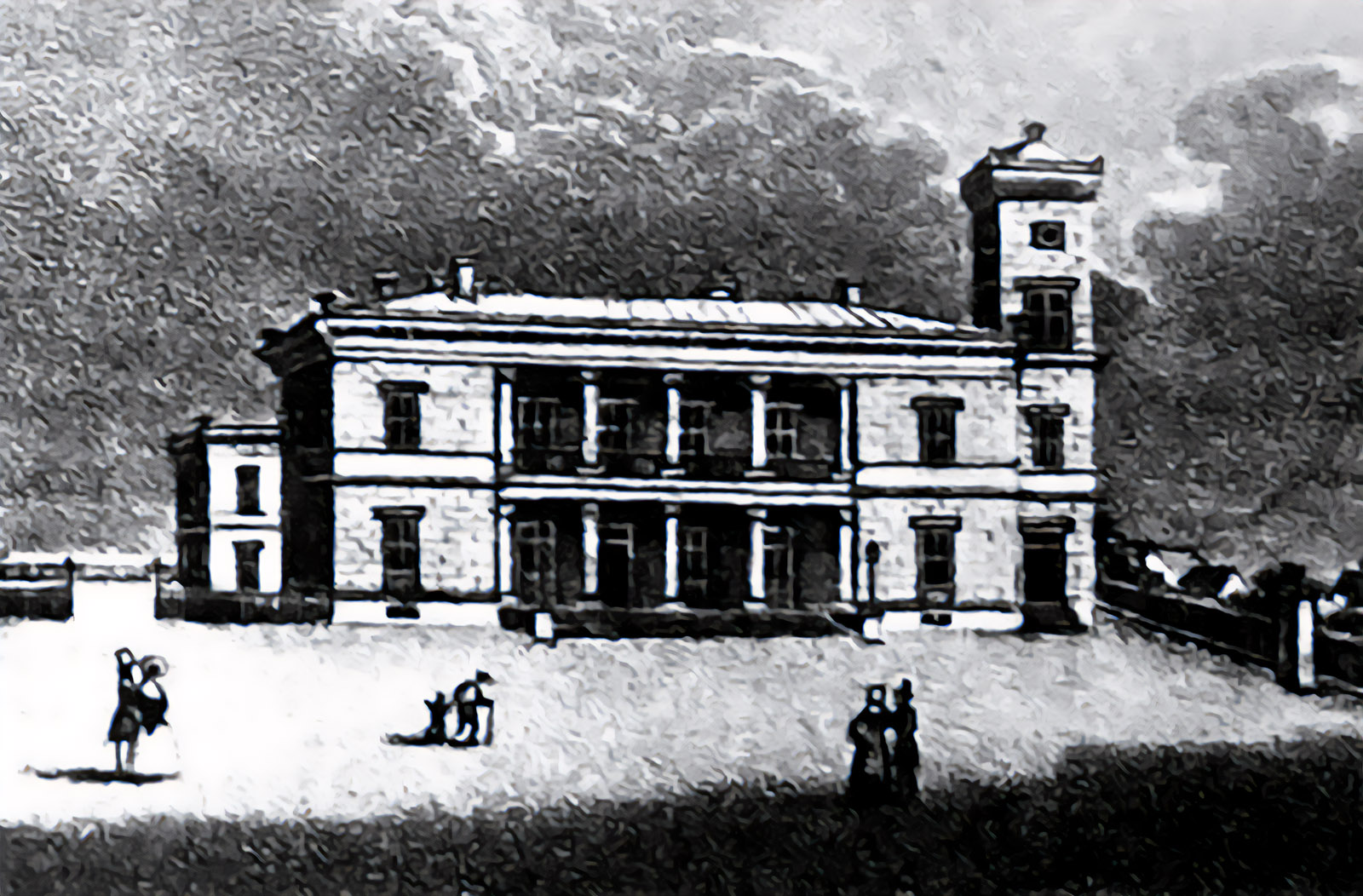
The first Stettiner Bahnhof, 1842

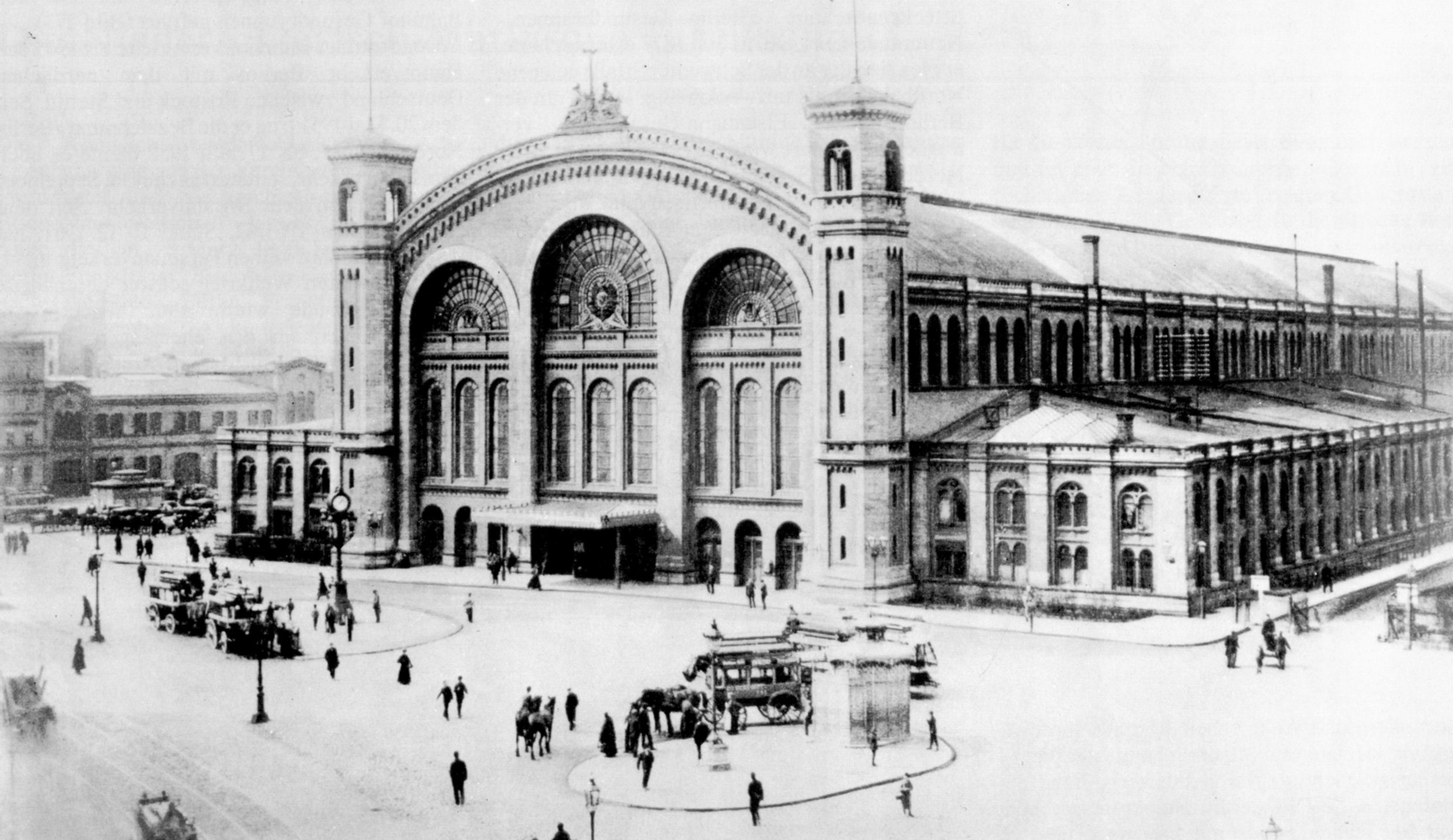
The second Stettiner Bahnhof, after 1876

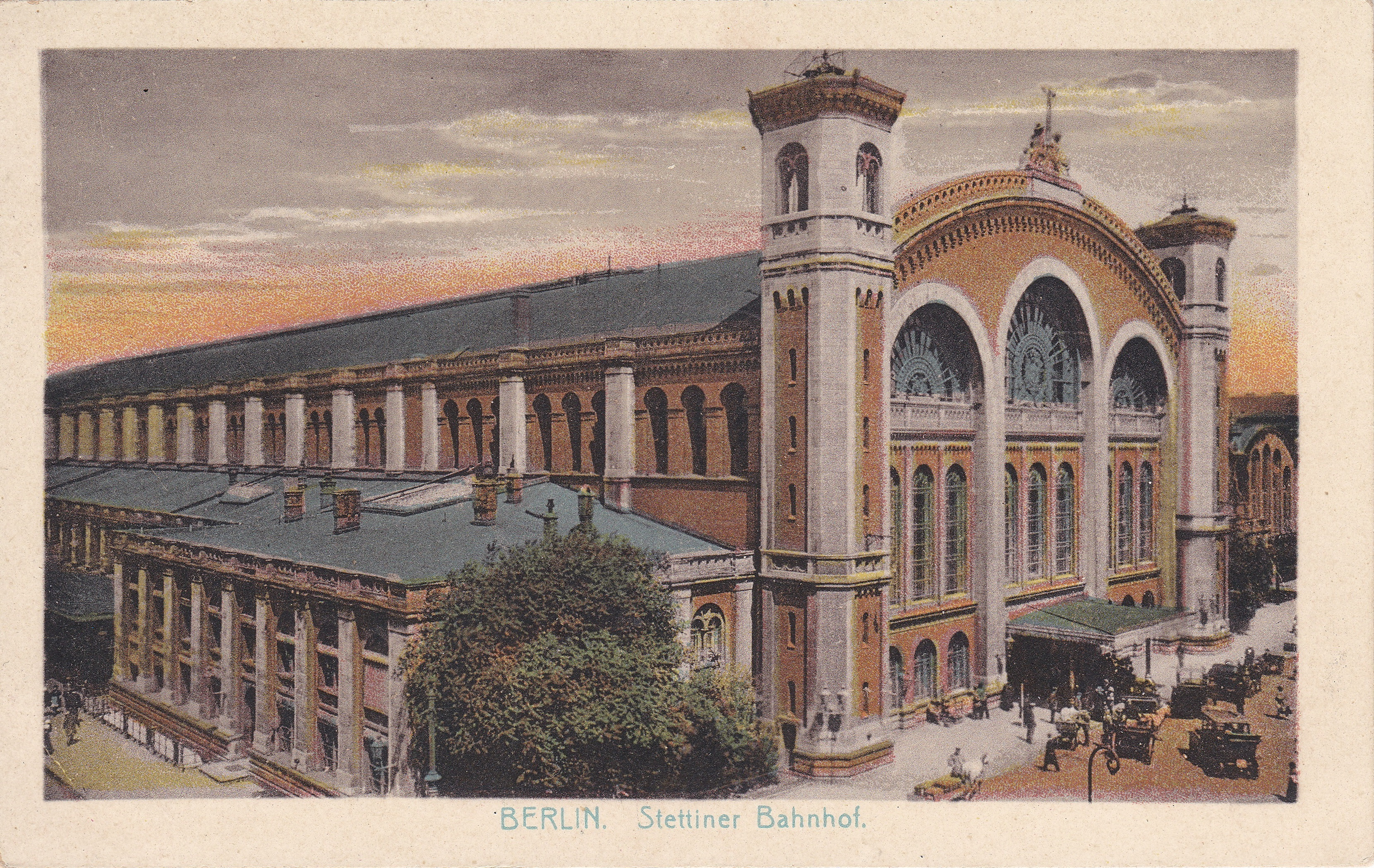
Stettiner Bahnhof after renovation on a postcard, after 1904

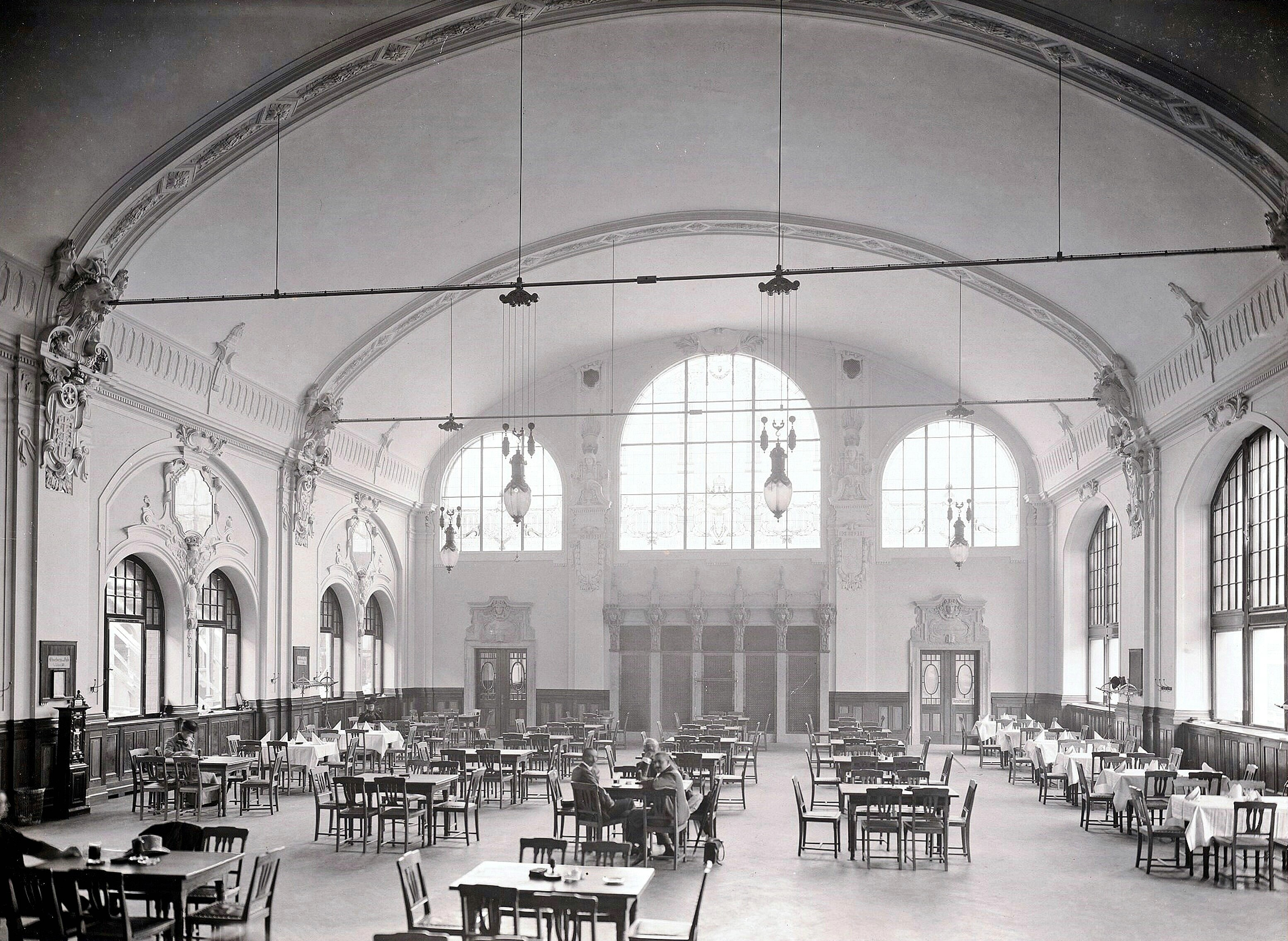
2nd Class Waiting room of the Stettiner Bahnhof after renovation, 1903

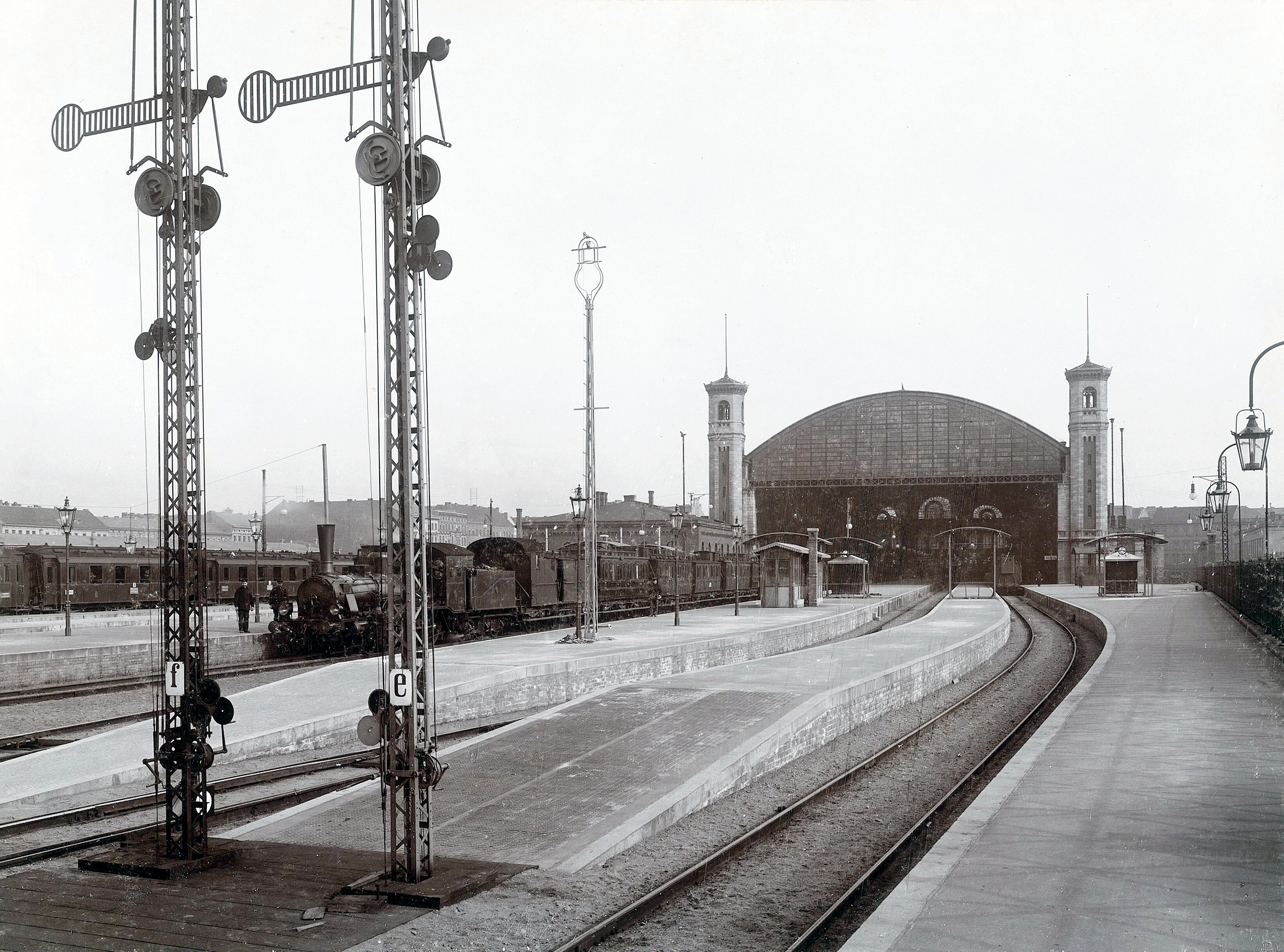
Platforms of the Stettiner Bahnhof leading into the main hall, 1903

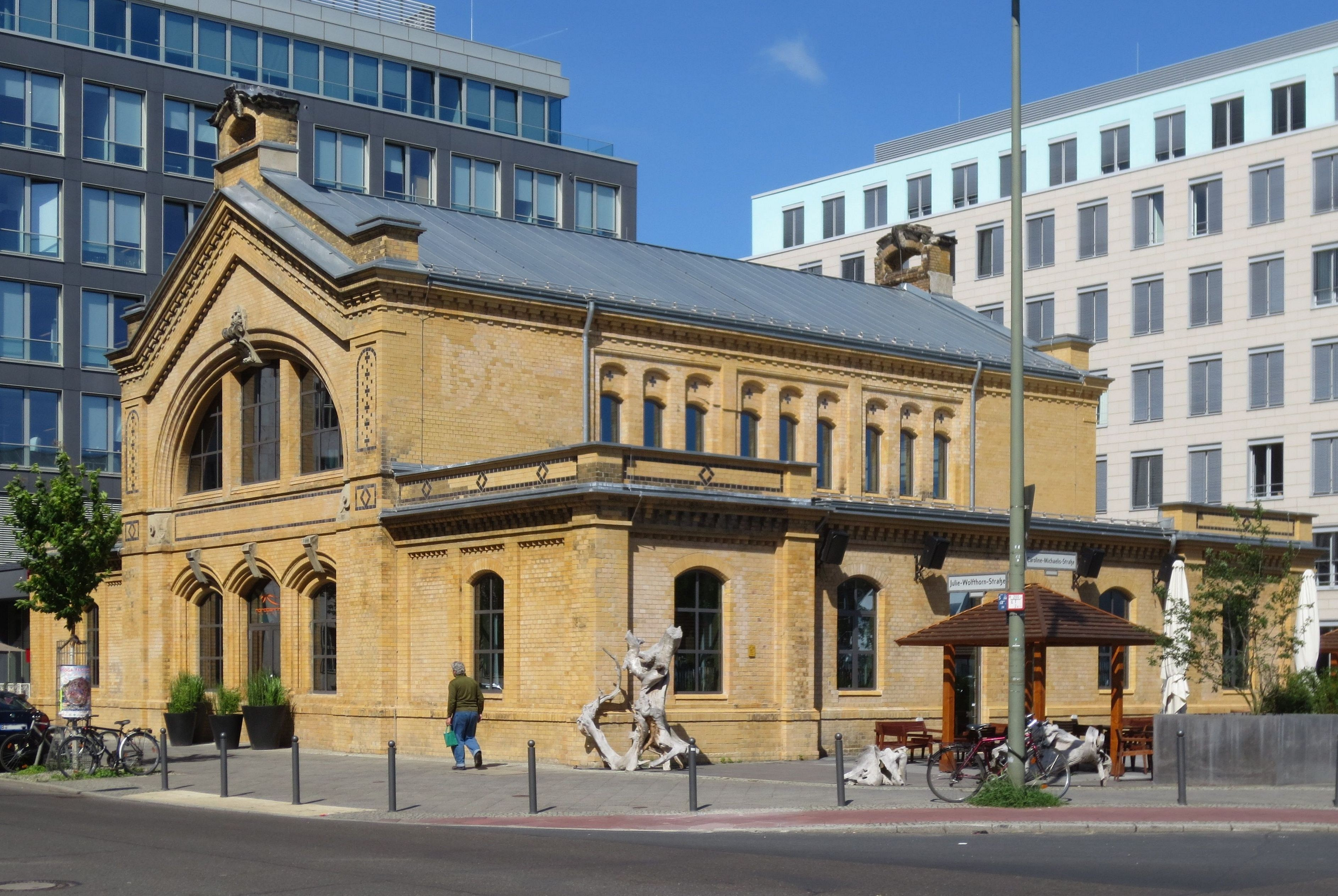
The old suburban station (2013), renovated in 2012 and containing an event venue (2022)

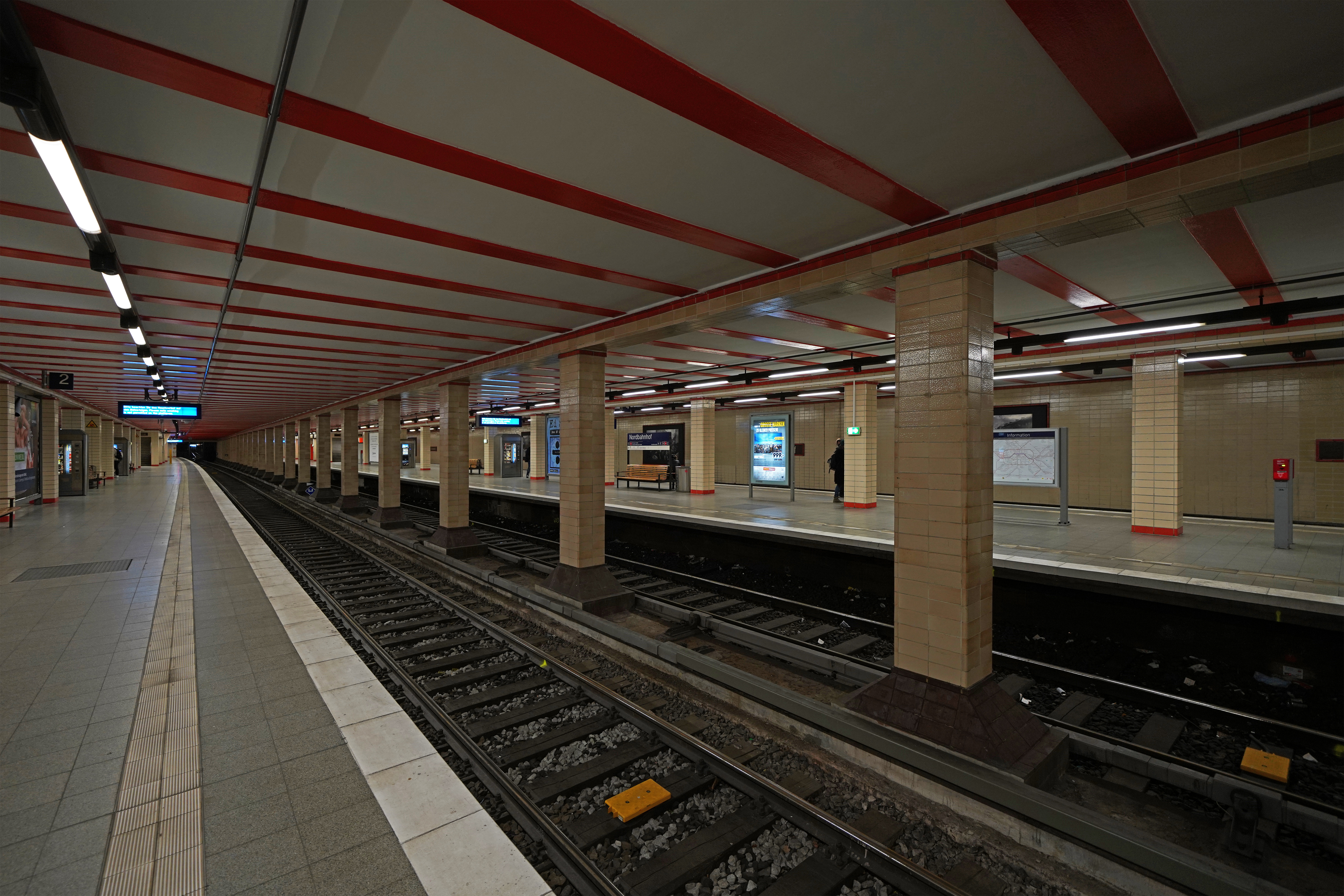
Platform looking north

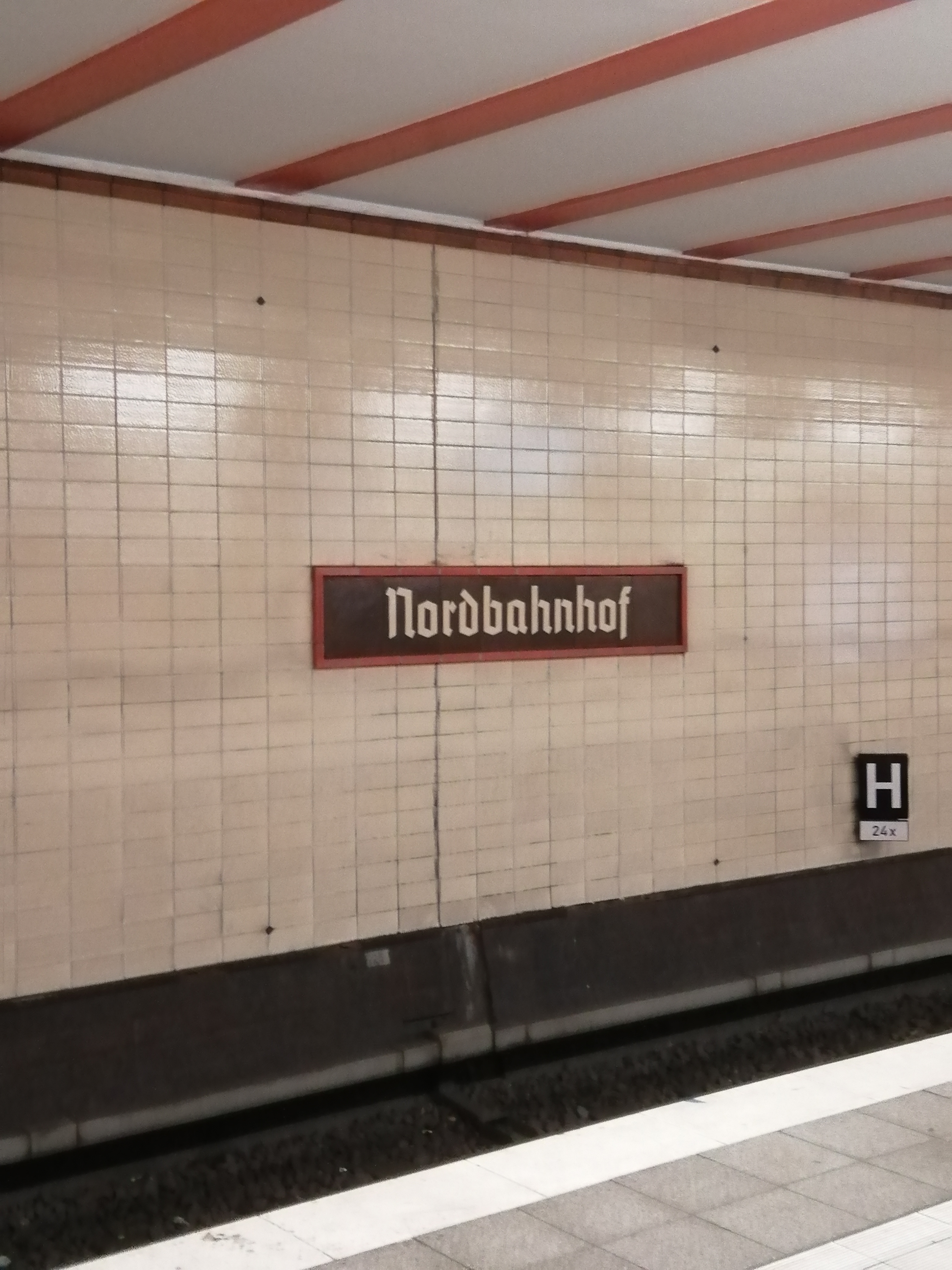
Station sign

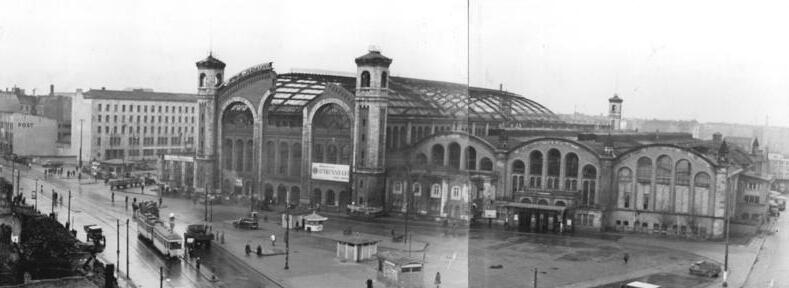
Ruin of the Stettiner Bahnhof, 1950

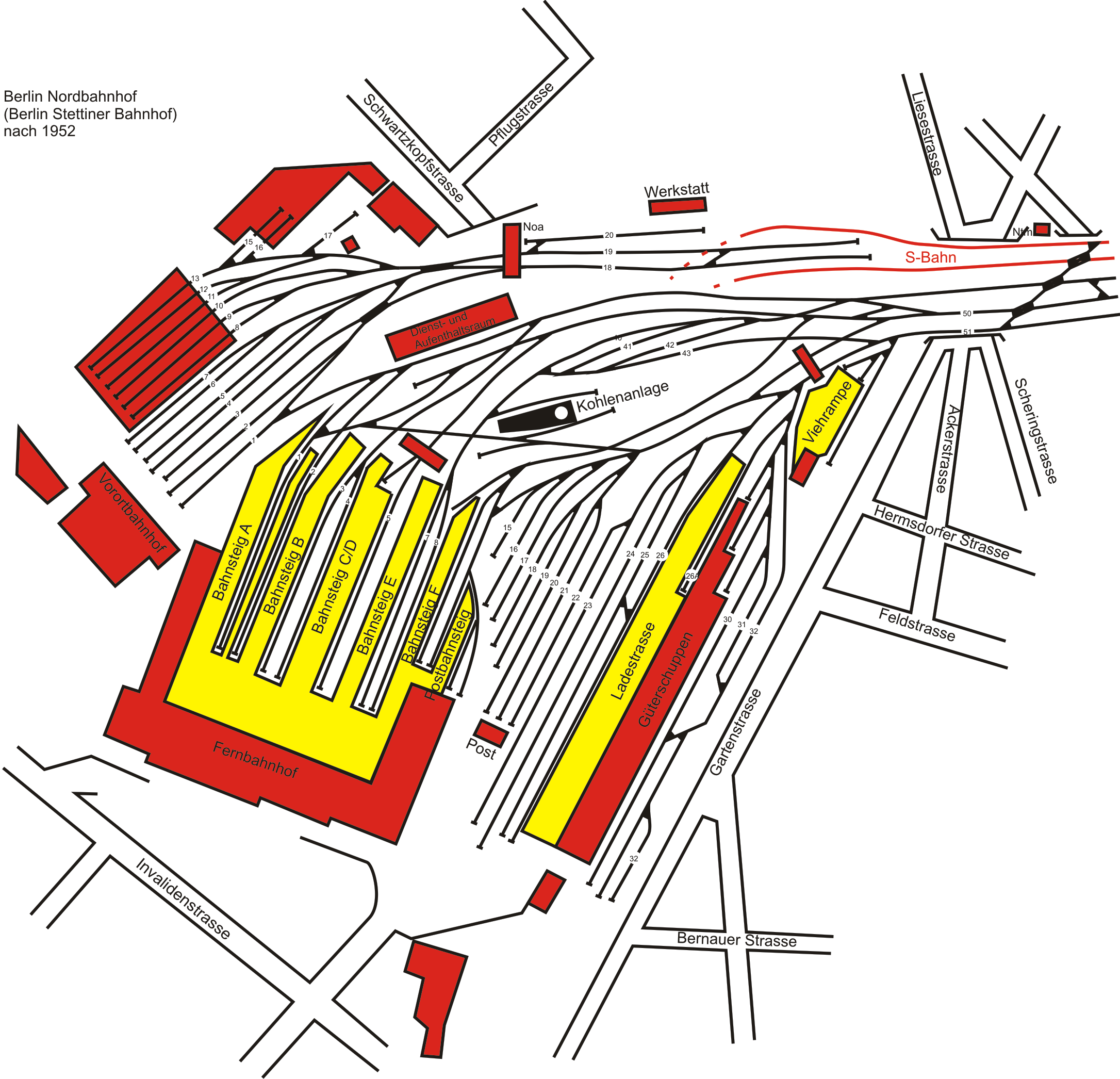
Track layout around the Stettiner bahnhof, about 1952
