= Gabriele Tergit =

German journalist and writer (1894–1982)

- Born: Gabriele Hirschmann; 4 March 1894; Berlin, Germany
- Died: 25 July 1982 (aged 88); London, England
- Occupation: Writer
- Writing career
- Period: 1931–1982
- Genres: Novel, journalism
- Notable works: Käsebier erobert den Kurfürstendamm, The Effingers

Gabriele Tergit (pseudonym for Elise Reifenberg née Hirschmann) (4 March 1894 – 25 July 1982) was a German-born British writer and journalist. She became known primarily for her court reports, and as a writer, for her novel Käsebier conquers the Kurfürstendamm (Käsebier erobert den Kurfürstendamm; in translation published under the title Käsebier Takes Berlin). Tergit served as secretary of the PEN-Center of German-language Authors Abroad. Tergit was the mother of mathematician Ernst Robert Reifenberg, who solved a Plateau’s problem.

== Early life and education ==
Elise Hirschmann was born into a Jewish family in Berlin, 4 March 1894. At the age of 19, she published her first newspaper article in a supplement of the Berliner Tageblatt in 1915. It was a piece on the problems of women in wartime. She interrupted her first attempt at entering the newspaper industry because the press was generally conceived to be no place for young women of upper-class backgrounds. She then studied history and philosophy at multiple German universities, eventually earning her doctorate in 1925 at the University of Frankfurt am Main under the supervision of the historians Friedrich Meinecke and Erich Marcks.

== Career ==
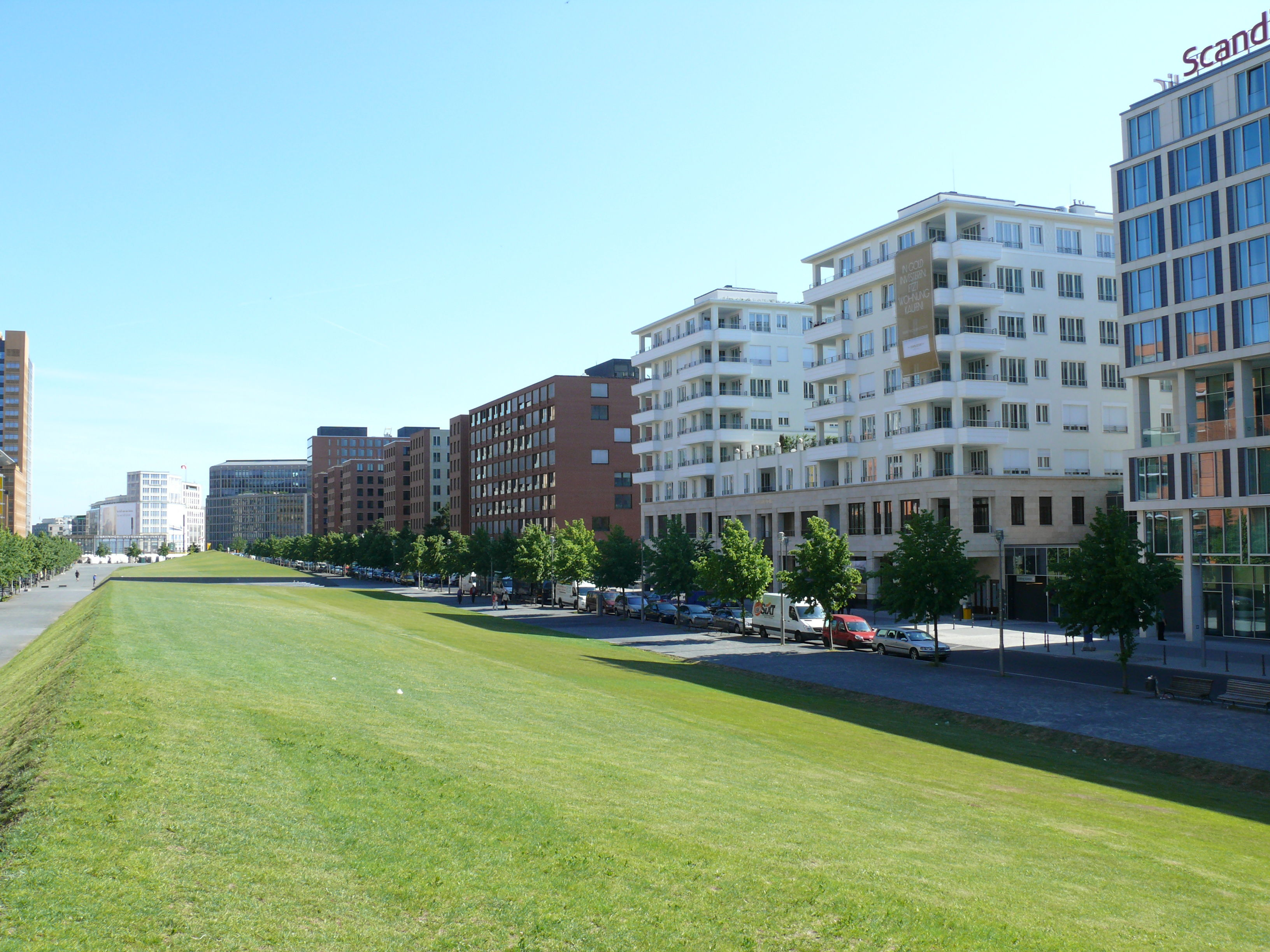
Gabriele Tergit Promenade in Berlin

Starting in 1920, Tergit published in the feuilletons of the Vossische Zeitung and the Berliner Tageblatt. During this time, Tergit became well known to the German newsreading public as a court-room reporter at the Berliner Tageblatt. She was amongst a group of reporters who introduced literary sensibilities to court-room reporting. Articles of her criticizing injustice or reactionary judges were also printed in the journal Die Weltbühne, which was published by Carl von Ossietzky. In 1928, she married the architect Heinz Reifenberg.

Her début novel, Käsebier erobert den Kurfürstendamm, appeared in 1932 and made her famous. Due to her critical assessment of trials involving Nazis, a horde of SA-men tried to force their way into her apartment in March 1933. She then fled to Spindlermühle, and later moved to Palestine. From 1938, she lived in London. She had already started her historical novel The Effingers (published in English in 2025) which deals with several generations of a German-Jewish family and which is sometimes dubbed the "Jewish Buddenbrooks". It was published in 1951 but had only limited success at the time of publication.

Tergit died in London, 25 July 1982. Posthumously, her recollections, Etwas Seltenes überhaupt, appeared in 1983. A street in Berlin is named after her.

== Works ==
- Käsebier erobert den Kurfürstendamm. Rowohlt 1932, Neuausgaben Krüger 1977, Arani 1988, Das Neue Berlin, Berlin 2004, Berliner Verlag 2007. Neuausgabe 2016: Schöffling, Frankfurt am Main 2016, ISBN 978-3-89561-484-2
- Effingers. Hammerich & Lesser, Hamburg 1951. (Translation published in 2025 by NYRB Classics)
- with Wilhelm Sternfeld: Autobiographien und Bibliographien. (Bibliographie unserer toten Mitglieder. Autobiographien unserer jetzigen Mitglieder). Hrsg. P.E.N.-Zentrum deutschsprachiger Autoren im Ausland. Expedite Duplicating Co.: London, 1959.
- Wagener, Hans. Gabriele Tergit: Gestohlene Jahre. Göttingen: 2013.
- Tergit, Gabriele. Etwas Seltenes Überhaupt: Erinnerungen. Berlin: 1983.
- Sutton, Fiona. ”Weimar’s Forgotten Cassandra: the Writings of Gabriele Tergit in the Weimar Republic” in German Novelists of the Weimar Republic: Intersections of Literature and Politics edited by Karl Leydecker. Suffolk: 2006.
