= Berlin Humboldthain station =

Railway station in Mitte, Germany

Coordinates: 52°32′42″N 13°22′46″E

Humboldthain
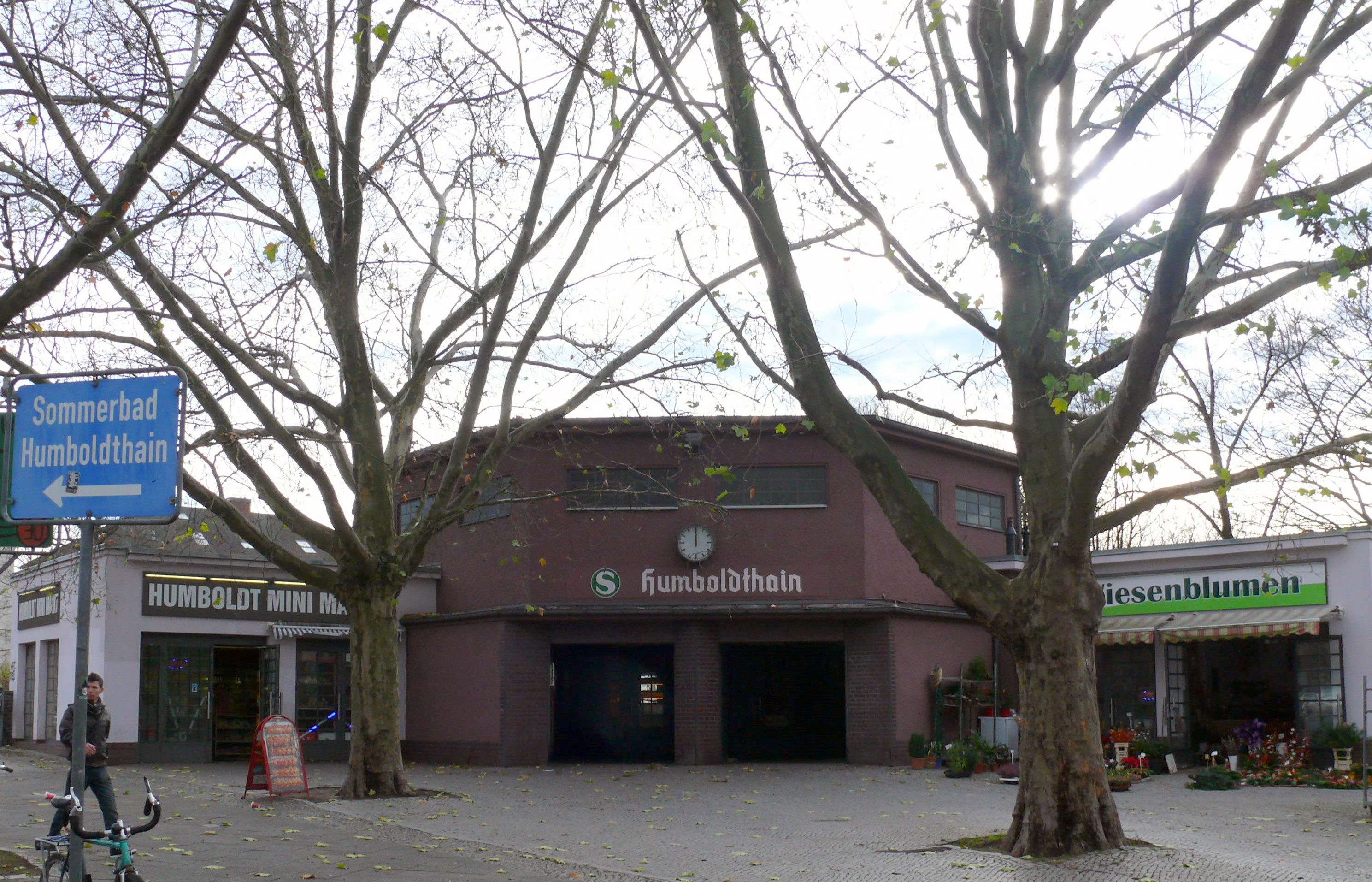

General information
- Location: Gesundbrunnen, Berlin, Berlin; Germany
- Platforms: 1 island platform
- Tracks: 2
- Connections: S1 S2 S25 S26

Other information
- Station code: 2944
- DS100 code: BHUM
- Category: 4
- Fare zone: VBB: Berlin A/5555

Services
Preceding station	Berlin S-Bahn	Following station
Gesundbrunnen towards Oranienburg	S1	Nordbahnhof towards Wannsee
Gesundbrunnen towards Bernau	S2	Nordbahnhof towards Blankenfelde
Gesundbrunnen towards Hennigsdorf	S25	Nordbahnhof towards Teltow Stadt
Gesundbrunnen towards Blankenburg	S26	Nordbahnhof towards Teltow Stadt
Location

Berlin Humboldthain station (German: Bahnhof Berlin Humboldthain) is a railway station in the city of Berlin, Germany. It is served by the Berlin S-Bahn lines S1,S2,S25 and S26. It is also served by local bus route 247.

== History ==
The S-Bahn station was opened on 21 January 1935, construction having started on 8 January 1934.

== Services ==
The station is served by the following services:

- Berlin S-Bahn services Oranienburg – Wittenau – Gesundbrunnen – Friedrichstraße – Potsdamer Platz – Schöneberg – Steglitz – Wannsee
- Berlin S-Bahn services Bernau – Karow – Pankow – Gesundbrunnen – Friedrichstraße – Potsdamer Platz – Sudkreuz – Blankenfelde
- Berlin S-Bahn services Hennigsdorf – Tegel – Gesundbrunnen – Friedrichstraße – Potsdamer Platz – Sudkreuz – Lichterfelde – Teltow
- Berlin S-Bahn services Blankenburg - Pankow - Gesundbrunnen - Friedrichstraße - Potsdamer Platz - Sudkreuz - Lichterfelde - Teltow
