= History of the Berlin S-Bahn =

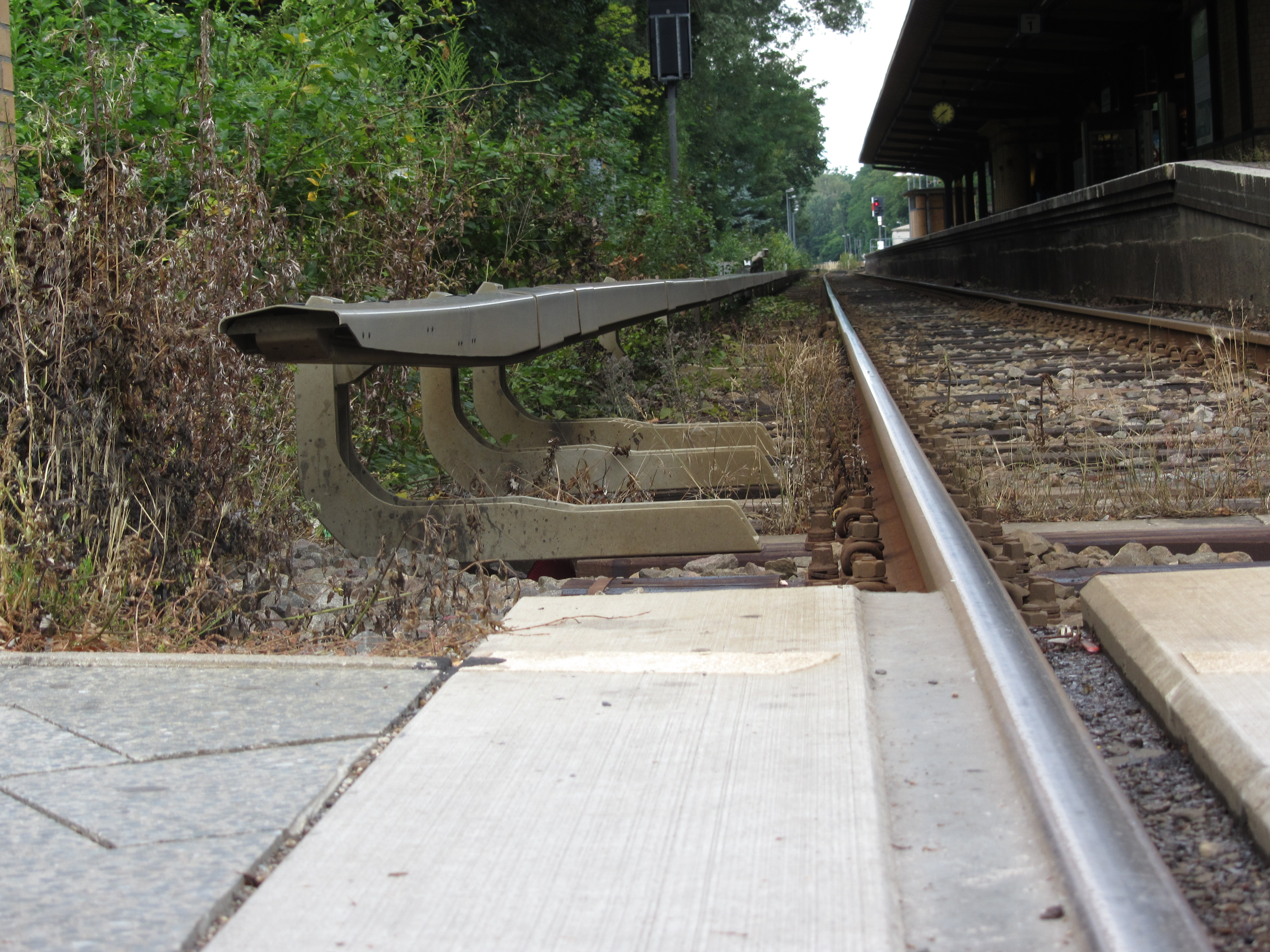
Berlin S-Bahn was converted from steam to third rail electrification starting in the late 1920s. The rail is bottom-contact. Seen here at the level crossing at Lichtenrade station

The Berlin S-Bahn began on 8 August 1924 with the first section from Stettiner Vorortbahnhof to Bernau using steam locomotives. On 13 August 1961, it was broken up when the Berlin Wall was built, resulting in two sections: the eastern part and the western part. The western part experienced a massive strike which resulted in closure of several stations, after declining use. Attempts were made to reopen at various times but in the end, only three lines were finally opened after the strike. Since 9 November 1989, when the Berlin Wall was opened, the Berlin S-Bahn began to expand rapidly with their budgetary costs.

== Before S-Bahn ==
The first line was opened from Zehlendorf to Potsdam in 1838. Until 1846, the city already counted five terminal stations, one of which resulted in almost all routes. Until 1882 four more stations were added. In order to connect the lines together, in 1851, the Berlin connection path along the former city wall was built at ground level. They circumnavigated the urban area in a three-quarter circle from Stettiner, the Hamburger, the Potsdamer and Anhalter Bahnhof to the Frankfurt train station. The constant traffic, particularly by the military, disabled strongly in passenger transport by road, so a new solution was contemplated.

The Berlin Ringbahn was opened on 1870s, followed by the true Berlin Stadtbahn which goes from Schlesischen Bahnhof to Charlottenburg. The rapid growth of the city and suburban traffic grew immensely. In the following years, other sections to Bernau and Königs Wusterhausen were provided with a second pair of tracks.

With individual sections dating from the 1870s, the S-Bahn was formed by and by as the network of suburban commuter railways running into Berlin, then interconnected by the circular railway connecting the various terminal railway stations, and in 1882 enhanced by the east–west cross-city line (called the "Stadtbahn", "city railway"). The forming of a distinct identity for this network began with the establishment of a special tariff for the area which was then called the "Berliner Stadt-, Ring- und Vorortbahnen", and which differed from the normal railway tariff. While the regular railway tariff was based on multiplying the distance covered with a fixed price per kilometer, the special tariff for this Berlin tariff zone was based on a graduated tariff based on the number of stations touched during the travel.

== Electrification ==
The core of this network, that is the cross-city ("Stadtbahn") East–west line and the circular Ringbahn, and several suburban branches were converted from steam operation to a third-rail electric railway in the latter half of the 1920s. The Wannsee railway, the suburban line with the highest number of passengers, was electrified in 1932/33. A number of suburban trains remained under steam, even after the Second World War.

Timeline of electrifications

Date	Stretch	Length (in m)
1 July 1903	Potsdamer Ringbahnhof – Lichterfelde Ost (550 V DC)	9,087
8 August 1924	Stettiner Vorortbahnhof – Bernau	22,676
5 June 1925	Gesundbrunnen – Birkenwerder	18,019
4 October 1925	Birkenwerder – Oranienburg	7,765
16 March 1927	Schönholz-Reinickendorf – Velten	21,162
11 June 1928	Potsdam – Stadtbahn – Erkner	57,168
10 July 1928	Wannsee – Stahnsdorf	4,135
23 August 1928	Charlottenburg – Spandau West	9,279
6 November 1928	Charlottenburg – Südring – Grünau	25,883
6 November 1928	Neukölln – Warschauer Straße	5,677
6 November 1928	Schlesischer Bahnhof – Kaulsdorf	11,258
1 February 1929	Charlottenburg – Nordring – Baumschulenweg	25,755
1 February 1929	Frankfurter Allee – Warschauer Straße	0,580
1 February 1929	Niederschöneweide-Johannisthal – Spindlersfeld	3,972
18 April 1929	Potsdamer Ringbahnhof – Papestraße	3,440
18 April 1929	Potsdamer Ringbahnhof – Ebersstraße	1,060
18 April 1929	Halensee – Westend	2,713
2 July 1929	Potsdamer Ringbahnhof – Lichterfelde Ost (conversion to 800 V DC)	9,087
18 December 1929	Jungfernheide – Gartenfeld	4,460
15 December 1930	Kaulsdorf – Mahlsdorf	1,366
15 May 1933	Potsdamer Wannseebahnhof – Wannsee	18,988
15 May 1933	Potsdamer Bahnhof – Zehlendorf Mitte (main line track)	11,960
15 May 1933	Wannsee Railway–Zehlendorf Mitte mainline link	1,040
28 July 1936	Humboldthain – Unter den Linden	2,691
28 July 1936	Heerstraße – Reichssportfeld	1,467
15 April 1939	Unter den Linden – Potsdamer Platz	0,941
15 April 1939	Priesterweg – Mahlow	11,595
9 October 1939	Potsdamer Platz – Großgörschenstraße	4,243
6 November 1939	Anhalter Bahnhof – Yorckstraße	1,571
6 October 1940	Mahlow – Rangsdorf	7,396
8 September 1943	Lichterfelde Ost – Lichterfelde Süd	2,668

== S-Bahn during Nazi Germany (1933 - 1945) ==
After building the east–west cross-city line connecting western suburban lines, which until then terminated at Charlottenburg station with eastern suburban lines which terminated at Frankfurter Bahnhof (later Schlesischer Bahnhof), the logical next step was a north–south cross-city line connecting the northern suburban lines terminating at Stettiner Bahnhof with the southern suburban lines terminating at the substations of the Berlin Potsdamer Bahnhof. The first ideas for this project emerged only 10 years after the completion of the east–west cross-city line, with several concrete proposals resulting from a 1909 competition held by the Berlin city administration. Another concrete proposal, already very close to the final realisation, was put forth in 1926 by the Breslau university professor Jenicke.

The decision to build was taken in 1933, as part of the public works programme undertaken by the new Nazi government to reduce unemployment. The projects do include:

- Construction of this Nord-Süd-S-Bahn (North-South S-Bahn), as it was called, began in 1934, with a tunnel from Berlin Anhalter Bahnhof to Berlin Stettiner Bahnhof (today 'Nordbahnhof') as its core section. A first phase, from the north to Unter den Linden was opened just in time for the 1936 Berlin Olympics; the southern section, via Potsdamer Platz, opened the month after the Second World War began, in October 1939.
- Construction of the Ost-West S-Bahn, which is supposed to go from Anhalter Bahnhof to Görlitzer Bahnhof via Oranienplatz, and to join Görlitzer Bahn.
- Extension of the suburban lines to Rangsdorf, Lichterfelde, and Reichssportfield.

The Nazis' 1939 "World Capital Germania" planning called for services to eventually run as follows:

Zuggruppe	Line	Stations	Stretch	Notes
1	Bernau/Oranienburg – Wannsee	31/35	Stettiner/Nordbahn, Nord-Süd-Tunnel, Wannseebahn	
2	Velten (Mark) – Ludwigsfelde	28	Kremmener Bahn, Tiergartentunnel, Anhalter Bahn	
3	Nauen/Wustermark – Wünsdorf	38/37	Lehrter/Hamburger Bahn, Tiergartentunnel, Dresdener Bahn	
A	Stettiner Bahnhof – Vollring – Stettiner Bahnhof	44	Ringbahn, Nord-Süd-Tunnel	über Südringspitzkehre
B	Jungfernheide – Gartenfeld	4	Siemensbahn	
G	Halensee – Strausberg	27	Stadtbahn, Ostbahn	
H	Spandau West – Grünau	29	Spandauer Vorortbahn, Stadtbahn, Görlitzer Bahn	
J	Schöneweide – Spindlersfeld	3	Zweigbahn Schöneweide–Spindlersfeld	
K	Königs Wusterhausen – Anhalter Bahnhof	18	Görlitzer Bahn, Innenstadttunnel	weiter als ZGr. 1
L	Potsdam – Erkner	32	Wetzlarer Bahn, Stadtbahn, Frankfurter Bahn	
M	Wannsee – Lichterfelde Ost	10	verlängerte Friedhofsbahn, Anhalter Bahn	

== During and after World War II ==
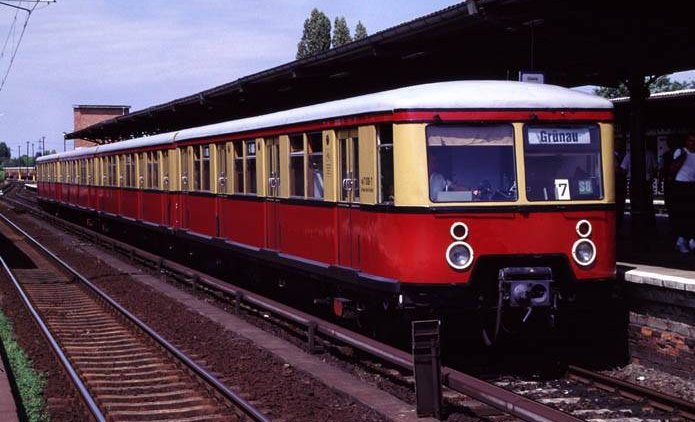
Some Type 477 trains, built before World War II, remained in service until the early 21st century

Many sections of the S-Bahn were closed during the war owing to enemy action. The Nord-Süd-Bahn tunnel was flooded on 2 May 1945 by retreating SS troops during the final Battle of Berlin. The exact number of casualties is not known, but up to 200 people are presumed to have perished, since the tunnel was used as a public shelter and also served to house military wounded in trains on underground sidings. Service through the tunnel commenced again in 1947.

After hostilities ceased in 1945, Berlin was given special status as a "Four-Sector City," surrounded by the Soviet Occupation Zone, which later became the German Democratic Republic (GDR). The Allies had decided that S-Bahn service in the western sectors of Berlin should continue to be provided by the Reichsbahn (DR), which was by now the provider of railway services in East Germany. (Rail services in West Germany proper were provided by the new Deutsche Bundesbahn.)

During the war, Berlin S-Bahn cars were overhauled at Luben to the east of Berlin. Since that town, now known as Lubin, was ceded to Poland under the terms of the Potsdam Agreement in 1945, 84 cars currently in the works were thus lost by Berlin. Further cars were sent east as war reparations, and eventually at least 287 cars were sent to the Soviet Union where they were converted for use in Moscow, Kiev, and Tallinn. Additionally at least 80 two-car sets were retained in Poland, where they were used on suburban services in the Gdańsk-Gdynia region until 1976. Some of the latter cars were then converted for use in overhead line maintenance trains, and some still exist in that role. One set is preserved in its Gdańsk-Gdynia condition at a museum at Kościerzyna near Gdynia.

=== Post-War ===
The first new railway line built after the war was opened on 7 March 1947, while post-war reconstruction was still ongoing. It ran from Mahlsdorf to the next station, Hoppegarten in Brandenburg. Approximately one and a half years later, Strausberg also connected to the grid. The construction proceeded quickly as preparations had been already made for this purpose.

After the end of the war, most of the depots in West Berlin were planned. New stretches were created, such as Jungfernheide – Spandau – Staaken/Falkensee, Lichterfelde Süd – Teltow, and Grünau – Königs-Wusterhausen. The steam-powered suburban traffic on these routes were mostly withdrawn to the new S-Bahn terminus.

Before the construction of the Berlin Wall, the Berlin S-Bahn continued to expand regularly:

Date	Stretch	Length (in m)
7 March 1947	Mahlsdorf – Hoppegarten	4,374
15 June 1948	Zehlendorf – Düppel	2,300
1 September 1948	Hoppegarten – Fredersdorf	5,949
31 October 1948	Fredersdorf – Strausberg	4,977
30 April 1951	Grünau – Königs Wusterhausen	14,061
7 July 1951	Lichterfelde Süd – Teltow	2,700
30 July 1951	Spandau West – Falkensee	6,614
3 August 1951	Spandau West – Staaken	3,470
28 August 1951	Jungfernheide – Spandau	6,170
25 December 1952	Schönhauser Allee – Pankow (freight tracks)	2,942
3 June 1956	Strausberg – Strausberg Nord (Shuttle before 1968)	9,136

== Cold War ==
As relations between East and West began to sour with the coming of the Cold War, the Berlin S-Bahn soon became a victim of the hostilities. Although services continued operating through all occupation sectors, checkpoints were constructed on the borders with East Berlin and on-board "customs checks" were carried out on trains. From 1958 onward, some S-Bahn trains ran non-stop through the western sectors from stations in East Berlin to stations on outlying sections in East Germany so as to avoid the need for such controls. East German government employees were then forbidden to use the S-Bahn since it travelled through West Berlin.

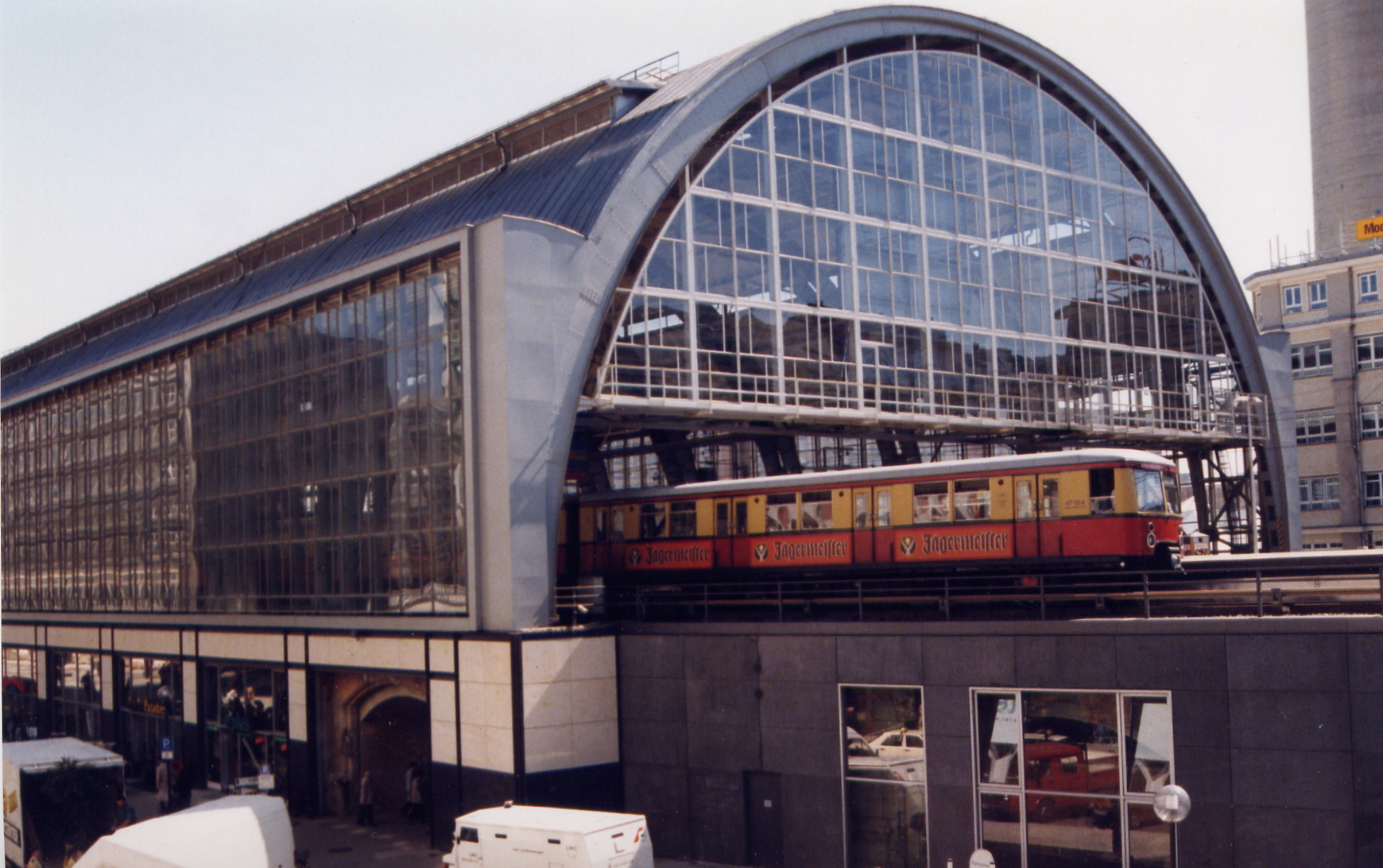
Alexanderplatz is an important transport hub in eastern Berlin

The western sectors of the city were physically cut off from East Germany on 13 August 1961, by what was later called the Berlin Wall, in a well-prepared plan to separate the two halves of the city – and at the same time, to divide the Berlin public transit network into two separate systems.

Stadtbahn services were curtailed from both directions at Friedrichstraße station. This station was divided into two physically separated areas, one for eastern passengers and one for westerners. Although the station lay within East Berlin, western passengers could transfer between S-Bahn lines or to the U-Bahn without passing through border checks, much like passengers changing planes at an international airport. The GDR also operated an Intershop in the portion of the station with services to and from West Berlin, where persons arriving from West Berlin (again without passing through border controls) could buy luxury goods such as tobacco and alcoholic beverages at discounted prices (compared to prices in West Berlin), provided they paid in hard currency, in part because Intershop customers did not pay West German taxes on their purchases. The West Berlin authorities were aware of this situation but did not impose stringent customs controls on such purchases out of political considerations. Friedrichstraße station also became the main entry point for train and U-Bahn passengers from West Berlin into East Berlin.

Similarly, selected sections on the Berlin S-Bahn together with the Ringbahn were cut at the borders of West and East Berlin; border fortifications such as a locked door were put up between the designated stations. These included:

- Spandau West – Albrechtshof (West Berlin - East Germany), the remainder of the section (Albrechtshof - Falkensee) was cut on 9 October 1961
- Heiligensee – Hennigsdorf (West Berlin - East Germany), the remainder of the section (Hennigsdorf - Velten) was cut in 1984
- Frohnau – Hohen Neuendorf (West Berlin - East Germany), the remainder of the section (Hohen Neuendorf - Oranienburg) was extended on 19 November 1961
- Lichtenrade – Mahlow (West Berlin - East Germany), the remainder of the section (Mahlow - Rangsdorf) was cut on 25 August 1961
- Lichterfelde Süd – Teltow (West Berlin - East Germany)
- Wannsee – Stahnsdorf (West Berlin - East Germany)
- Wannsee – Griebnitzsee (West Berlin - East Germany), the remainder of the section (Griebnitzsee - Potsdam Stadt) was cut on 9 October 1961
- Gesundbrunnen – Schönhauser Allee (Ringbahn)
- Bornholmer Straße – Pankow (the middle tracks were sealed with a fence, another compensatory track from Pankow to Schönhauser Allee was built as a result)
- Sonnenallee – Treptower Park (Ringbahn)
- Köllnische Heide – Baumschulenweg (Ringbahn)

DR and BVG had discussed separate arrangements for the Nord-Süd-Bahn by restricting travel to West Berliners only as it passed through the East Berlin territory in the city centre, and it did not stop at underground East Berlin S-Bahn stations, which were called ghost stations. Two armed guards were positioned at all ghost stations to ensure that no passengers jumped aboard trains or smashed windows to allow escape from East Berlin. Only some maintenance works on the Nord-Süd-Bahn were allowed between 1961 and 1989, and trains had to slow down to 60 km/h instead of the normal speed limit. Bornholmer Straße was also a ghost station, because the exits were only towards the border crossing.

=== West Berlin Situation ===
Zuggruppe	Line	Stations	Route	Notes
1	Frohnau – Wannsee	23	Nordbahn, Nord-Süd-Tunnel, Wannseebahn	not stopping in East Berlin, except Friedrichstraße und Wollankstraße
2	Schönholz → Lichterfelde Süd → Heiligensee	12	Nordbahn, Nord-Süd-Tunnel, Anhalter Bahn	refer to Zuggruppe 1
3	Heiligensee → Lichtenrade → Schönholz	18	Kremmener Bahn, Nord-Süd-Tunnel, Dresdener Bahn	refer to Zuggruppe 1
5	Zehlendorf – Düppel	3	Stammbahn	Zweimannbetrieb
A	Gesundbrunnen – Sonnenallee/Köllnische Heide	19↻ 19↺	Ringbahn, Verbindungsbahn Baumschulenweg–Neukölln	
B	Beusselstraße – Gartenfeld	4	Ringbahn, Siemensbahn	
C	Zoologischer Garten – Sonnenallee	14	Stadtbahn, Ringbahn	
H	Staaken – Friedrichstraße	15	Spandauer Vorortbahn, Stadtbahn	
L	Wannsee – Friedrichstraße	11	Wetzlarer Bahn, Stadtbahn	
N	Beusselstraße – Spandau West	5	Hamburger Bahn	

=== Berlin S-Bahn strike in 1980 ===
Because the S-Bahn was operated by the DR, West Berliners vented their frustration at the building of the wall by boycotting the S-Bahn since its fares were seen as subsidising the communist regime in the East. "Keinen Pfennig mehr für Ulbricht," or "not a penny more for Ulbricht," became the S-Bahn opponents' chant. Within days of the Berlin Wall being built, the BVG, with assistance from other transit companies in West Germany, began providing "solidarity-with-Berlin buses" – new bus services that parallelled the S-Bahn lines and therefore provided an alternative. After many years of declining passenger use and difficult industrial relations between the West Berlin workforce and their East Berlin employers, most of the western portion of the S-Bahn was closed down on 11 September 1980 following a strike.

A 20-minute service was still provided on the Stadtbahn from Westkreuz to Friedrichstraße as well as services on the Nord-Süd-Bahn between Frohnau, Friedrichstraße, Lichtenrade, or Wannsee. The following routes were also cut after the strike on 22 September 1980:

- Gesundbrunnen – Jungfernheide – Westkreuz – Schöneberg – Sonnenallee / Köllnische Heide (reopening in 1993 to 2002)
- Westkreuz – Olympiastadion – Spandau (reopening in 1999)
- Spandau – Staaken
- Jungfernheide – Gartenfeld (Siemensbahn)
- Jungfernheide – Spandau
- Zehlendorf – Düppel

The S1 section from Wannsee to Anhalter Bahnhof was therefore reopened in 1984.

The only sections that were left opened after the strike do include:

- Frohnau – Gesundbrunnen – Friedrichstraße – Anhalter Bf – Lichtenrade (N I)
- Heiligensee – Gesundbrunnen – Friedrichstraße – Anhalter Bf – Lichterfelde Süd (N II)
- Wannsee – Westkreuz – Charlottenburg – Zoologischer Garten – Friedrichstraße (S I)

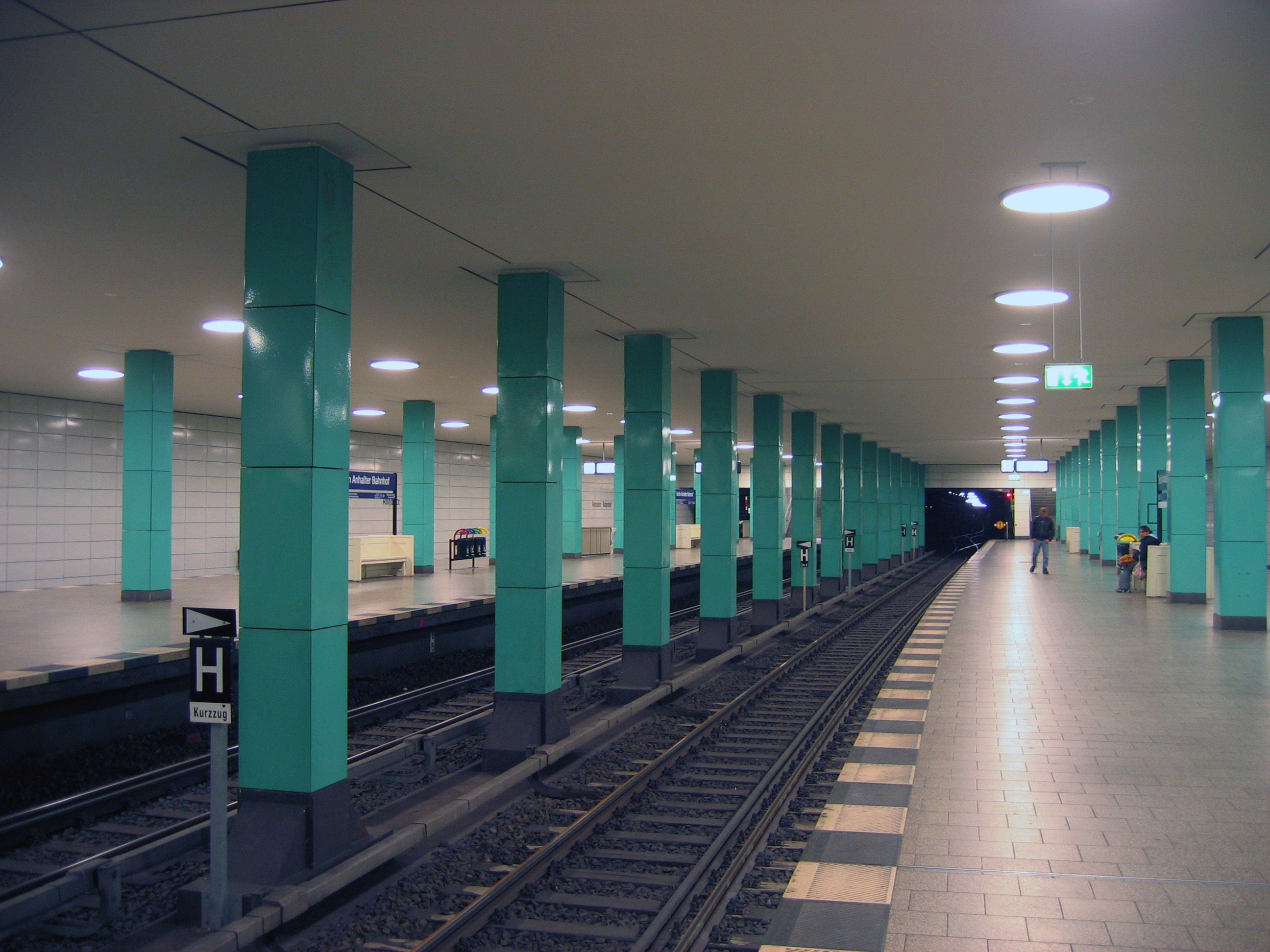
The track system is a fully separated and independent rapid transport system within the city. Station: Anhalter Bahnhof

The 1980 incidents turned media and political attention toward what was left of West Berlin's S-Bahn network. The city government decided to enter negotiations with East Germany, which were finally successful.

=== S-Bahn in the BVB ===
By contrast, during the same period, services on the S-Bahn in East Berlin were increased and new lines built as housing projects expanded eastward from the city centre. With most of the U-Bahn located in West Berlin, the S-Bahn became the backbone of the East Berlin transit network.

The DR purchased DR Class 270 as a result, where it is only cut short to 166 trains and the last orders were delivered in 1991. The remaining orders were cancelled after the reunification.

The extended 40 kilometres of the Berlin S-Bahn with expansion in the east are denoted as follows:

Date	Section	Length (in m)
19 November 1961	Hohen Neuendorf – Blankenburg	17,839
10 December 1961	Schönhauser Allee – Pankow (compensated track)	2,075
26 February 1962	Grünauer Kreuz – Flughafen Schönefeld	5,804
30 December 1976	Friedrichsfelde Ost – Marzahn	3,808
15 December 1980	Marzahn – Otto-Winzer-Straße	1,759
30 December 1982	Otto-Winzer-Straße – Ahrensfelde	1,724
20 December 1984	Springpfuhl – Hohenschönhausen	4,747
20 December 1985	Hohenschönhausen – Wartenberg	0,962

=== BVG took over the S-Bahn in West Berlin ===
On January 9, 1984, the BVG took over responsibility for the operation of S-Bahn services in West Berlin. After further closures that same day, a limited service was restored, initially comprising only two short sections with no direct interchange between them. In the years between 1984 and 1989, several sections were gradually reopened, resulting in a network of 71 km (44 mi) and three lines – with one line running on the Stadtbahn and two on the Nord-Süd-Bahn – comprising about 50% of West Berlin's original network. This development brought West Berlin's S-Bahn back into public awareness and restored its popularity.

BVG had also ordered BVG Class 480 for operations in the western part of the area since 1987 to replace some of the older rundown trains (Class 475, 476 and 477).

- S1: Anhalter Bahnhof - Wannsee
- S2: Frohnau - Lichtenrade
- S3: Wannsee - Friedrichstraße

BVG planned to open Berlin S-Bahn in the west, which is planned from 1984 to 1992, but was shelved before the opening of the Berlin Wall, the S-Bahn should be grown to about 117 km.

- Neukölln – Köllnische Heide
- Jungfernheide – Gartenfeld
- Jungfernheide – Spandau
- Schönholz – Heiligensee
- Zehlendorf – Düppel

Until 1984, all Berlin S-Bahn routes were allocated letters as a means of identifying the route of the train. These letters were occasionally followed by Roman numerals to indicate a short working or bifurcation in the service (e.g., A, BI, BII, C,) and are still used internally by the Berlin S-Bahn GmbH for timetabling and in conjunction with radio call-signs to each train unit. When the BVG took over the responsibility for the operation of S-Bahn services in West Berlin in 1984, it introduced a new unified numbering scheme for both the S-Bahn and the U-Bahn, which it also operated. Existing U-Bahn route numbers were prefixed with the letter U, while the new S-Bahn route numbers were prefixed with the letter S. This system of numbering routes was used in other West German cities and was extended to the S-Bahn service for the whole city after reunification.

== Reunification ==
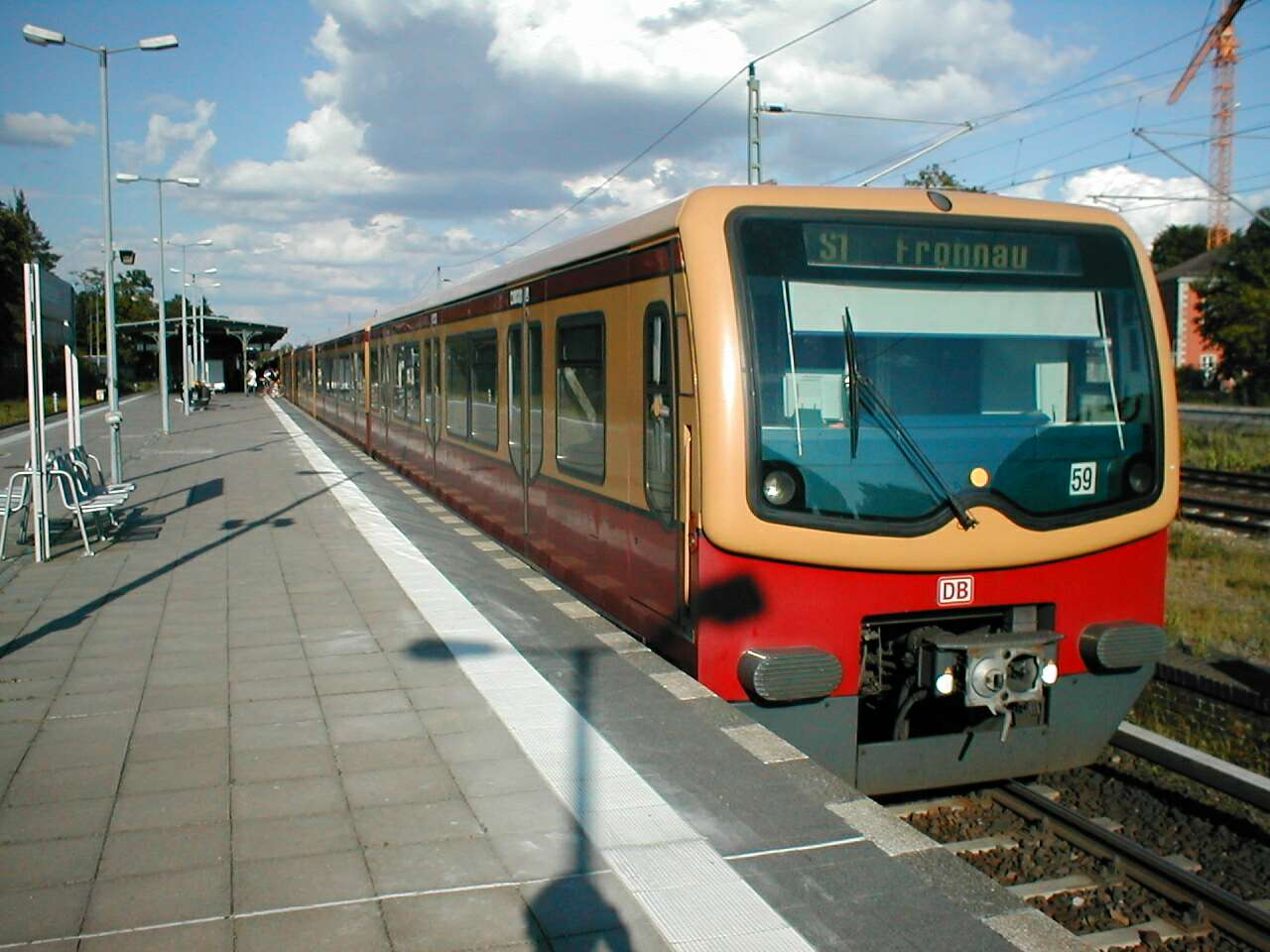
A modern S-Bahn train at Griebnitzsee

After the Berlin Wall came down in November 1989, the first broken links were re-established, with Friedrichstraße on 1 July 1990, as the first. The BVG and DR jointly marketed the services soon after the reunification. Administratively, the divided S-Bahn networks remained separate in this time of momentous changes, encompassing German reunification and reunification of Berlin into a single city, although the dividing line was no longer the former Berlin Wall. DR and BVG (of the whole of reunified Berlin from 1 January 1992, after absorbing BVB of East Berlin) operated individual lines end to end, both into the other party's territories. For example, S2 was all BVG even after it was extended northward and southward into Brandenburg/former East German territory. The main east–west route (Stadtbahn) was a joint operation. Individual trains were operated by either BVG or DR end-to-end on the same tracks. This arrangement ended on 1 January 1994, with the creation of Deutsche Bahn due to the merger between DR and the former West Germany's Deutsche Bundesbahn. All S-Bahn operations in Berlin were transferred to the newly formed S-Bahn Berlin GmbH as a subsidiary of Deutsche Bahn, and the BVG withdrew from running S-Bahn services.

Technically, a number of projects followed in the steps of re-establishing broken links in order to restore the former S-Bahn network to its 1961 status after 1990, especially the Ringbahn. In December 1997 the connection between Neukölln and Treptower Park via Sonnenallee was reopened, enabling S4 trains to run 75% of the whole ring between Schönhauser Allee and Jungfernheide. On 16 June 2002, the section Gesundbrunnen – Westhafen also reopened, re-establishing the Ringbahn operations.

Date	Stretch	Length (in m)	Notes
1 April 1992	Wannsee – Potsdam Stadt	8,968	Closed on 13 August 1961
31 May 1992	Frohnau – Hohen Neuendorf	4,176	Closed on 13 August 1961
31 August 1992	Lichenrade - Blankenfelde	5,750	Closed on 13 August 1961
17 December 1993	Westend – Baumschulenweg	18,344	Closed on 28 September 1980. (Westend – Köllnische Heide); Closed on 13 August 1961 (Köllnische Heide – Baumschulenweg)
28 May 1995	Schönholz – Tegel	6,846	Closed on 9 January 1984.
28 May 1995	Priesterweg – Lichterfelde Ost	3,979	Closed on 9 January 1984.
15 April 1997	Westend – Jungfernheide	2,227	Closed on 28 September 1980.
18 December 1997	Neukölln – Treptower Park	3,358	Closed on 28. September 1980 (Neukölln – Sonnenallee); Closed on 13 August 1961 (Sonnenallee – Treptower Park)
16 January 1998	Westkreuz - Pichelsberg	4,774	Closed on 28 September 1980.
25 September 1998	Lichterfelde Ost – Lichterfelde Süd	2,668	Closed on 9 January 1984.
15 December 1998	Tegel – Hennigsdorf	8,302	Closed on 9 January 1984. (Tegel – Heiligensee); Closed on 13 August 1961 (Heiligensee – Hennigsdorf)
30 December 1998	Pichelsberg – Spandau	4,146	Closed on 28 September 1980.
19 December 1999	Jungfernheide – Westhafen	3,146	Closed on 28 September 1980.
17 September 2001	Pankow – Gesundbrunnen	2,648	Closed on 13 August 1961 (Pankow – Bornholmer Straße); Closed on 9 January 1984 (Bornholmer Straße – Gesundbrunnen)
17 September 2001	Schönhauser Allee – Gesundbrunnen	1,783	Closed on 13 August 1961
17 September 2001	Schönhauser Allee – Bornholmer Straße	1,688	New construction
15 June 2002	Westhafen – Gesundbrunnen	3,463	Closed on 28 September 1980.
24 February 2005	Lichterfelde Süd – Teltow	2,880	Closed on 13 August 1961, moved to Teltow Stadt.

== Service reductions ==
On 20 July 2009, known locally as "Black Monday," the S-Bahn service was significantly reduced owing to safety checks on the trains ordered by the German Federal Railway Authority. These checks were ordered because of an accident on 3 May 2009, involving an S-Bahn train. Maintenance for this train was delayed by 2 years, symptomatic for the strategy to cut spending in the Deutsche Bahn subsidiary. Having so many trains taken out of service for inspection left less than 30 percent of the system's rolling stock available for revenue service. Eight routes, including most through services on the Stadtbahn, were closed, and on other lines headways were reduced to 20 minutes and trains shortened.

Some minor restorations in service were made on 3 August 2009. Owing to new inspection troubles the S-Bahn network was again reduced dramatically on 8 September 2009 when 75% of the trains were withdrawn from service for inspection and faulty brake cylinders. There were again no trains on the Stadtbahn between Westkreuz and Alexanderplatz and no S-Bahn trains to Spandau. Trains on the circle lines, S41 and S42, were running at 10-minute intervals. Other routes were running with extended intervals and reduced distances.

In late 2009, the Berlin Senate expected that normal operations would only resume in 2013. In January 2010, DB announced that they expected the system to resume normal service in December 2010 and employed 300 new staff in their workshops. In the same month, the Berlin transport Senator Ingeborg Junge-Reyer rejected an extension of the traffic contract with the operator Deutsche Bahn (DB) which is due to expire in December 2017.

By spring of 2011, some 420 train sets were in service, a considerable improvement over the situation in 2009 but still insufficient compared to the 500 needed to provide a normal full service. The S-Bahn announced it was to invest €120 million to achieve the goal of 500 train sets in service by December 2011. Rüdiger Grube, the head of the DB, announced that losses due to the S-Bahn crisis had reached €370 million at the end of 2010. He expected them to reach €700 million by the end of 2014, with no operating profits to be made before the end of the contract in December 2017.

MTR Corporation, National Express Group, Berlin S-Bahn GmbH and RATP Development had tendered for their procurement process, and were soon followed by train manufacturer Stadler Rail for their operations from 2018 to 2033. The specific contracts are:

Ringbahn -

- S41 Südkreuz - Südkreuz (clockwise Ring)
- S42 Südkreuz - Südkreuz (anticlockwise Ring)
- S46 Berlin Main Station - Westend - Königs Wusterhausen
- S47 Spindlersfeld – Hermannstraße
- S8 Birkenwerder - Wildau

Stadtbahn -

- S3 Erkner - Spandau
- S5 Westkreuz - Strausberg-Nord
- S7 Ahrensfelde - Potsdam Hbf
- S75 Wartenberg - Warschauer Straße
- S9 Berlin-Brandenburg BER - Spandau

Nord-Süd Bahn -

- S1 Potsdam - Oranienburg
- S2 Blankenfelde - Bernau
- S25 Teltow Stadt - Hennigsdorf
- S45 Berlin-Schönefeld - Südkreuz
- S85 Grünau - Waidmannslust

== Infrastructure work ==
Starting in 2010, DB Netz is replacing mechanical train stops on the S-Bahn network with electronic balises. The track-side installation of new ZBS train control system shall be completed in 2015 whereas there is migration phase for train operation up to 2025.
