= DBAG Class 481 =

Rolling stock for the Berlin S-bahn

DBAG Baureihe 481/482
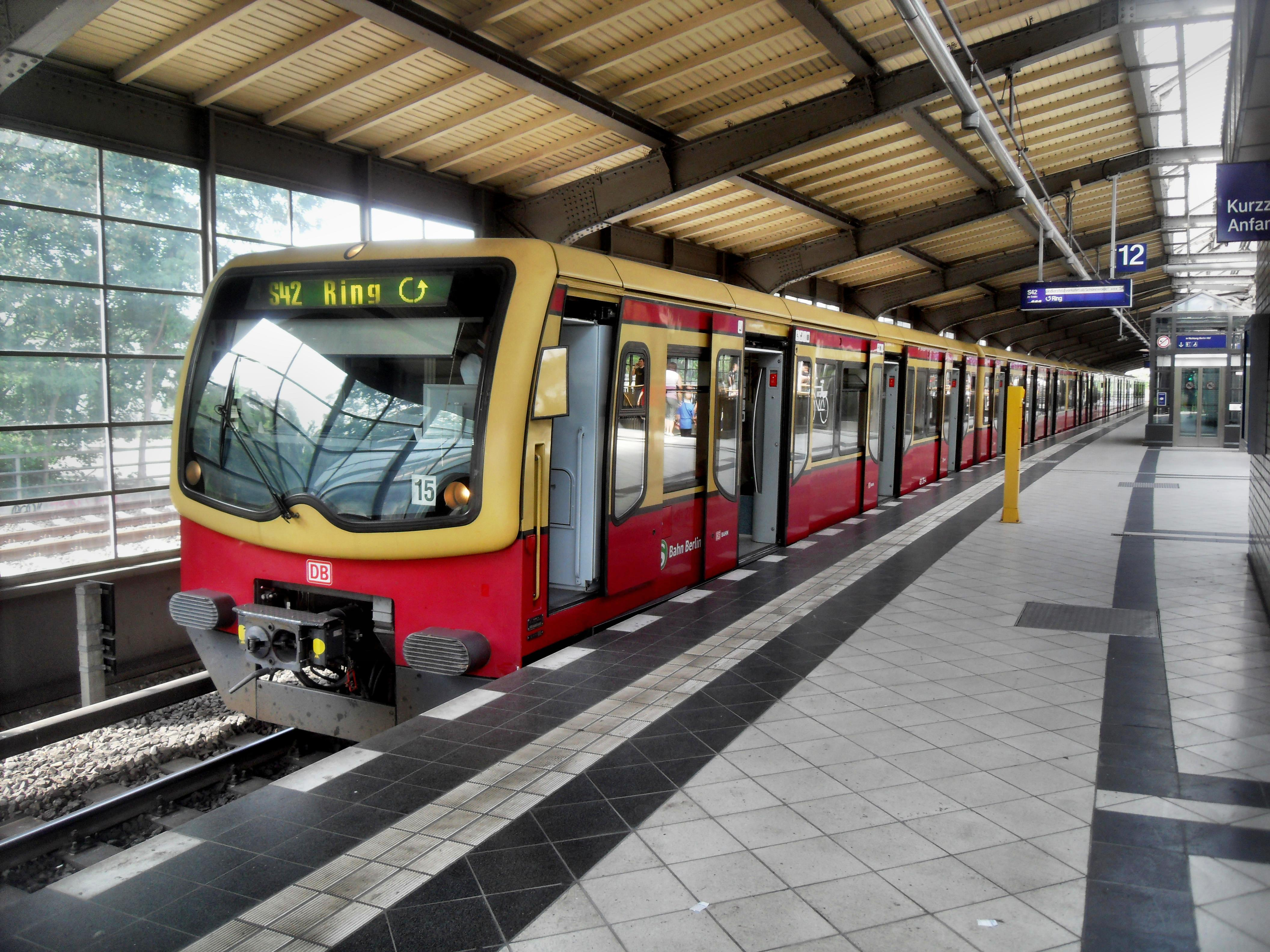
- DBAG Class 481 at Berlin Westkreuz station
- Manufacturers: AEG; Adtranz; DWA
- Built at: Hennigsdorf (AEG and Adtranz) and Halle (DWA)
- Constructed: 1996–2004
- Number built: 500 quarter trains
- Operators: Deutsche Bahn AG; Berlin S-Bahn

Specifications
- Train length: 36.8 m (120 ft 9 in)
- Width: 3,000 mm (9 ft 10 in) (outer frame); 3,140 mm (10 ft 4 in) (with safety sills)
- Height: 3,585 mm (11 ft 9.1 in)
- Floor height: 1,000 mm (39.37 in)
- Maximum speed: 100 km/h (62 mph) (lowered to 80 km/h (50 mph) by regulator)
- Weight: 59 t (58 long tons; 65 short tons)
- Traction system: AEG DASU 7.1 3-level GTO–VVVF
- Traction motors: 6 × VEM DKABZ 2806-4B 99 kW (133 hp) 3-phase AC induction motor
- Power output: 594 kW (797 hp)
- Acceleration: 1.0 m/s^{2} (3.3 ft/s^{2})
- Deceleration: 1.3 m/s^{2} (4.3 ft/s^{2})
- Electric systems: 750 V DC third rail
- Current collection: Contact shoe
- UIC classification: Bo′2′+Bo′Bo′
- Safety systems: mechanical train stop, ZBS Eurobalises (after 2015)
- Track gauge: 1,435 mm (4 ft 8 1/2 in) standard gauge

The DBAG Class 481/482 is an electric multiple unit train for the Berlin S-Bahn. The class 481 was designed to replace the aging rail cars after the German reunification in 1990. The first mock-up models were presented in 1993 with the first rollout on 22 January 1996.

== History ==
In 1990 most of the rail cars were still composed of mostly Class 475, 476 and 477 vehicles from before World War II. The average age was about 50 years at the time. Both the West Berlin and East Berlin S-Bahn operators had already started to replace their aging fleet with Class 480 (West) and Class 485 (East). The German reunification prompted a unification of the operators leading also to a requirement of a common operation scheme for the whole of Berlin. When the last of the 500 rail cars had been delivered, the theoretical 55 years average age shrunk to merely 6 years in 2004.

After some teething problems the Class 481 trains proved to be reliable. A number of components had to be replaced with higher quality parts, especially on the doors. About a decade after delivery, the train type experienced a notable technical accident on 1 May 2009 when a wheel broke at Kaulsdorf station. An investigation showed that the wheels were built too lightly and the brakes were not properly dimensioned according to current regulations – this led to a plan to replace the wheel sets on all trains of this type. The operator reconstructed a repair shop to carry out the repairs, but the replacement works were running too slow, so that some of the inspections could not be carried out at their scheduled time, leading to some of the rolling stock being temporarily withdrawn from service, and timetables had to be revised as fewer trains were available to operate it. When the acceptable margin was overrun as well, the federal regulator withdrew permission to operate 100 of the sets of this type, which led to serious transport problems on the Berlin S-Bahn in 2010. Further problems at the height of winter 2011 led to more train sets being withdrawn, as some of the motors and sanding equipment needed to be reconstructed.

Since 2011, the Berlin S-Bahn network started transition to a modern train safety system, the ZBS train control, based on Eurobalises. Only the Class 481 will be equipped with ZBS on-train safety equipment, with the installations to be complete for all 500 quarter trains until the end of 2016. Originally it was planned to withdraw all older types of rolling stock on the Berlin S-Bahn after 2017. However, due to a number of setbacks in the ordering process for the new Class 483 and 484, as well as population growth in Berlin (rising by about half a million residents), the old train types (Class 480 and Class 485) will continue to run until 2023.

== Technical details ==
=== Vehicles ===
Each 481/482 unit is formed of two cars - one 481 car with driving cab, and one 482 car without a cab, connected by a walkthrough gangway, forming a so-called quarter-train. Three units (501/601 – 503/603) consist of four cars connected by three gangways. As driving cabs are required on both ends of each consist, the minimum train length for a Class 481/482 train is a half-train with 4 cars (Kurzzug), formed 481-482-482-481. Two half-trains coupled together form an 8 car Vollzug, the longest possible train length. 6 car trains are also run, namely on S 25, S 26, S 41, S 42, S 47 and S 85.

The seating is arranged in a 2 + 2, with an open area at one end to accommodate bicycles and wheelchairs.

Regenerative brakes are fitted, leading to an average electricity saving of 30 percent over the S-Bahn network. Three of the four bogies in each 2 car unit are powered. In the interior, mainly clean and vandal-resistant fabrics were used.

Due to their characteristic howling start-up noise, which is typical for three-phase AC motors with pulsed voltage control, these vehicles are occasionally also called "circular saws", "hoe buoys" or "flying alarms". The loud start-up and brake noise has led to many complaints.

=== Depots ===
Depot	Units
Berlin-Wannsee (BWSS1):	001–033, 035–042, 044–350, 501/601–503/603
Berlin-Grünau (BGAS1):	481/482 034, 043, 351–494

The trains from the Grünau and Wannsee depots are pooled and so it is common to see trains formed of units from both Grünau and Wannsee.

=== Routes ===
The DBAG 481 series can operate on all lines of the Berlin S-Bahn. The lines S1, S2, S25, S3, S5, S7, S75 and S9 are exclusively operated by the 481. Often the 481 also operates on the Ringbahn S41 and S42, and at the weekends is the only type used on the Ringbahn. The same is true for the S47.

== See also ==
- HKL Class M200 – a forked version of the DBAG 481 used on the Helsinki Metro in Finland
