= ZBS =

ZBS stands for

- ZBS Foundation
- Zugbeeinflussungssystem S-Bahn Berlin
- Zone blocking scheme
