= BVG Class 480 =

Rolling stock for the Berlin S-bahn

BVG/DBAG Class 480 Toaster
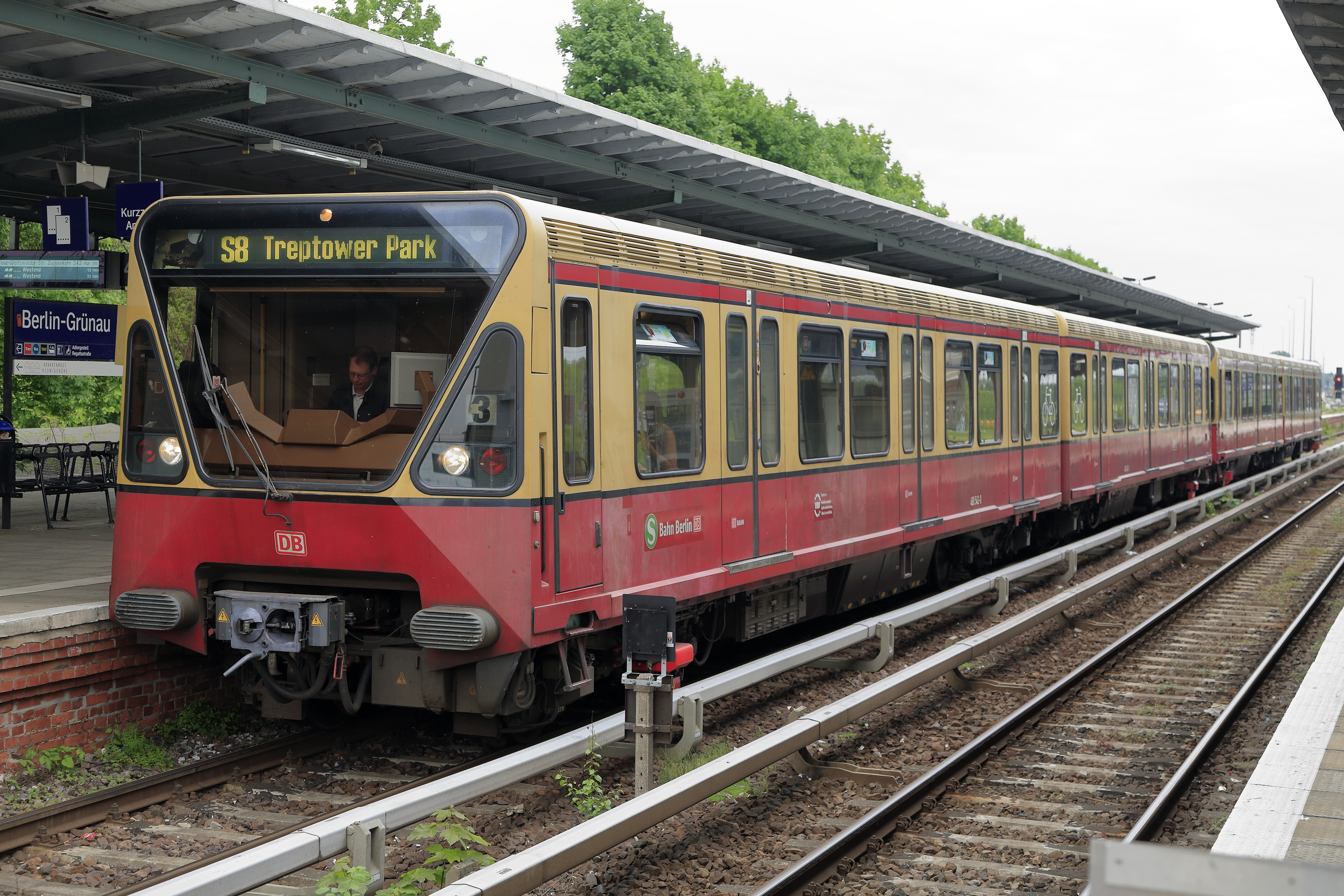
- BVG Class 480 at Grünau
- Manufacturer: AEG; Siemens; Waggon Union
- Designer: Herbert Lindinger
- Constructed: 1986–1987 (prototypes); 1990–1994 (production)
- Number built: 85 married pairs
- Operators: Deutsche Bahn (Berlin S-Bahn)

Specifications
- Train length: 36.8 m (120 ft 9 in)
- Maximum speed: 100 km/h (62 mph)
- Weight: 59 t (58 long tons; 65 short tons)
- Electric system(s): 750 V DC third rail
- Current collection: Contact shoe
- UIC classification: Bo′Bo′+Bo′Bo′
- Safety system(s): Train stop and ZBS
- Track gauge: 1,435 mm (4 ft 8 1/2 in) standard gauge

The BVG Class 480 (German: BVG-Baureihe 480) is an electric multiple unit for the Berlin S-Bahn. It was originally meant to replace the aging S-Bahn rail cars in West Berlin, but after the reunification of the city, the remaining orders were cancelled and replaced by new orders for DBAG Class 481 cars in 1993. Following the withdrawal of the Class 485 in November 2023, the Class 480 are the oldest trains in service on the Berlin S-Bahn.

The Class 480 is also known by rail enthusiasts as the "Toaster", partly due to the angular design, partly due to the similarly named model BR 480 toaster that was produced in the 1950s by one of the trains' manufacturers (Siemens), (Note: The German word for a train class, Baureihe, is often abbreviated to BR: in this case, the train's abbreviated name is BR 480.) and partly in reference to a series of fires that plagued the fleet due to technical issues.

== History ==
Class 480 cars were ordered by BVG because the Class 475 trains, which had been taken over from Deutsche Reichsbahn (DR) when BVG took control of the S-Bahn in West Berlin in 1984, were inadequate for use in West Berlin and were outdated. Both ends of a four-unit Class 480 train have a driving cab, allowing the flexibility of having two multiple units together. Four prototypes (numbered 480001/501 to 480004/504) were delivered from December 1986 to March 1987, followed by 41 production trains (480005/505 to 480045/545) from 24 October 1990 to 31 July 1992.

Due to delays in the design of the Class 481, and to cope with reopening of the S-Bahn lines post-reunification, DR ordered forty extra Class 480 trains from Waggon Union in 1992, at a cost of 230 million DM (US$148 million). The extra trains – numbered 480046/546 to 480085/585 – were delivered to the Grünau maintenance depot from October 1993 to 22 August 1994, before being transferred to the Wannsee depot in September 1994.

As a result of in incident in the Nord-Süd Tunnel in August 2004, in which the last vehicle in a train was destroyed by fire, Class 480 trains were removed from routes S1, S2 and S25, bringing Class 481 trains into the service on these routes ahead of plan. These trains were redeployed to other lines such as S41, S42, S45 and S8. S85 also decided to use these trains. Due to the arrival of the Class 483/484 trains, all of them were relocated to line S3, where they still operate. What is important to mention, is that they don't exclusively operate on the S3. They can also still be seen on the S1/S2/S25/S26 lines and sometimes even other lines. The S5 is also a line where you can spot a BR480 quite often.

== Design and operation ==
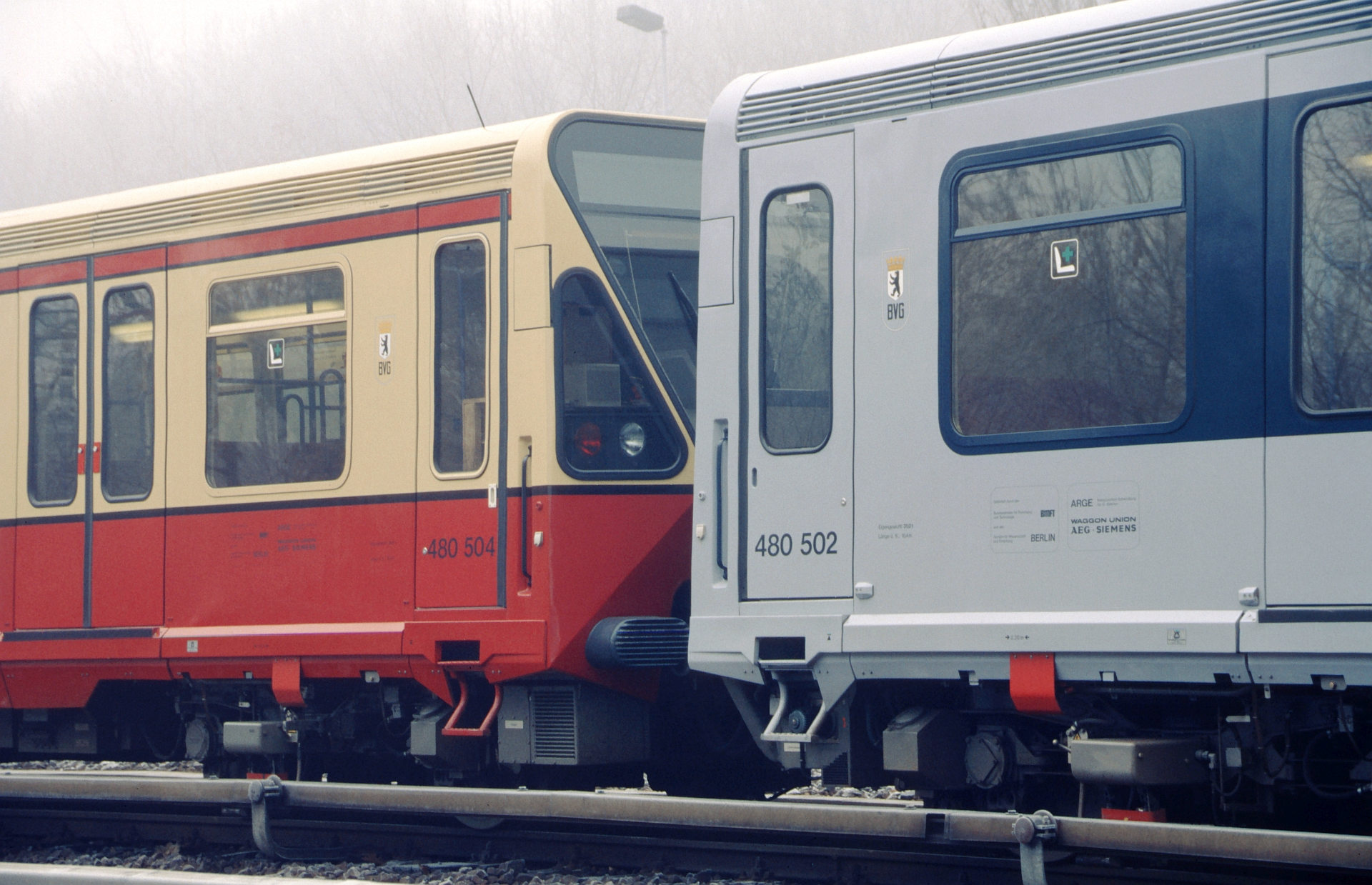
Prototypes 480502 (right) in a blue-grey livery, and 480504 (left) in the "traditional" red and ochre livery

The Class 480 was designed by Herbert Lindinger, and is recognisable by its three-part angular windshield, large windows, and three sets of plug doors per side: the doors were wider than the old trains (at 1.3 metres) to reduce boarding times, and dedicated space was provided in each car to accommodate bicycles, buggies and wheelchair users.

Lindinger also proposed a new blue-grey livery for the trains that was applied to the mock-up and prototypes 480001/501 and 480002/502, while 480003/503 and 480004/504 carried the "traditional" red and ochre livery: according to the Berliner Zeitung in 2021, many Berliners did not like the blue-grey livery, and both the prototypes and production trains eventually adopted the "traditional" livery.

=== Formation ===
A Class 480 unit is a two-car married pair (German: Doppeltriebwagen) with driver's cabs on both ends: this is similar to the formation of Classes A3L and F of the Berlin U-Bahn, both of which were in production around the same time as the Class 480. According to Deutsche Bahn, the arrangement allowed for standalone quarter or three-quarter train services during off-peak hours – something that only the Class 480 could provide until the introduction of the Class 483 in 2021.

Each unit measures (overall) 36.8 metres long, 3.12 metres wide and 3.6 metres high: a car body measures 17.8 metres long and three metres wide. Each unit also weighs about 59 tonnes when empty, and can carry up to a total of 292 passengers (92 seating and 200 standing).

== Deployment of trains ==
There are currently 65 units in service, according to Deutsche Bahn. These trains were deployed and commonly been seen at various lines:

- S41: Ring (clockwise)
- S42: Ring (counter-clockwise)
- S45: Flughafen Schönefeld - Berlin-Südkreuz
- S46: Königs Wusterhausen – Westend
- S47: Spindlersfeld – Hermannstraße
- S8: Zeuthen – Birkenwerder
- S85: Grünau – Pankow

== Fires ==
The Class 480 suffered five fires from 1992 to 2009, all caused by technical faults: the fires (along with the angular design and the Siemens toaster) contributed to the popularisation of the "Toaster" nickname:

- On 3 November 1992, 480025 was destroyed and 480525 was damaged by fire at Lichtenrade, due to a faulty heating system: there were no injuries because the train was empty at the time.
- On 31 August 1995, a fire broke out on 480009 at Berlin-Tegel, due to another faulty heating system.
- On 11 February 2000, 480053 was destroyed by fire near Berlin Yorckstraße, due to defective cable insulation: there were no injuries, although passengers were forced to evacuate across the track.
- On 10 August 2004, 480050/550 was destroyed by fire Anhalter Bahnhof, due to a technical fault: the fire also damaged 480060 and the station platforms, and three people were treated for smoke inhalation.
- On 25 February 2009, an empty 480556 was destroyed by fire at Wannsee, due to a faulty heating system: the following month, the Class 480 was banned from the Nord-Süd Tunnel.

== Planned withdrawal and service extension ==
According to Deutsche Bahn, the "Toasters" were supposed to be replaced by Classes 483 and 484 by December 2023: however, 65 units were overhauled so that they could remain in service until the end of the decade. The upgrades, funded by the Senate of Berlin, included replacing all interior lighting with LEDs, and adding support for the ZBS (Zugbeeinflussungssystem) signalling system, which is replacing the old system based on train stops. However, the trains did not receive the new livery (mostly ochre with a red skirt and black doors) and interior (with blue seats), as the Class 481 did.
