= Blankenfelde-Mahlow =

- Municipality
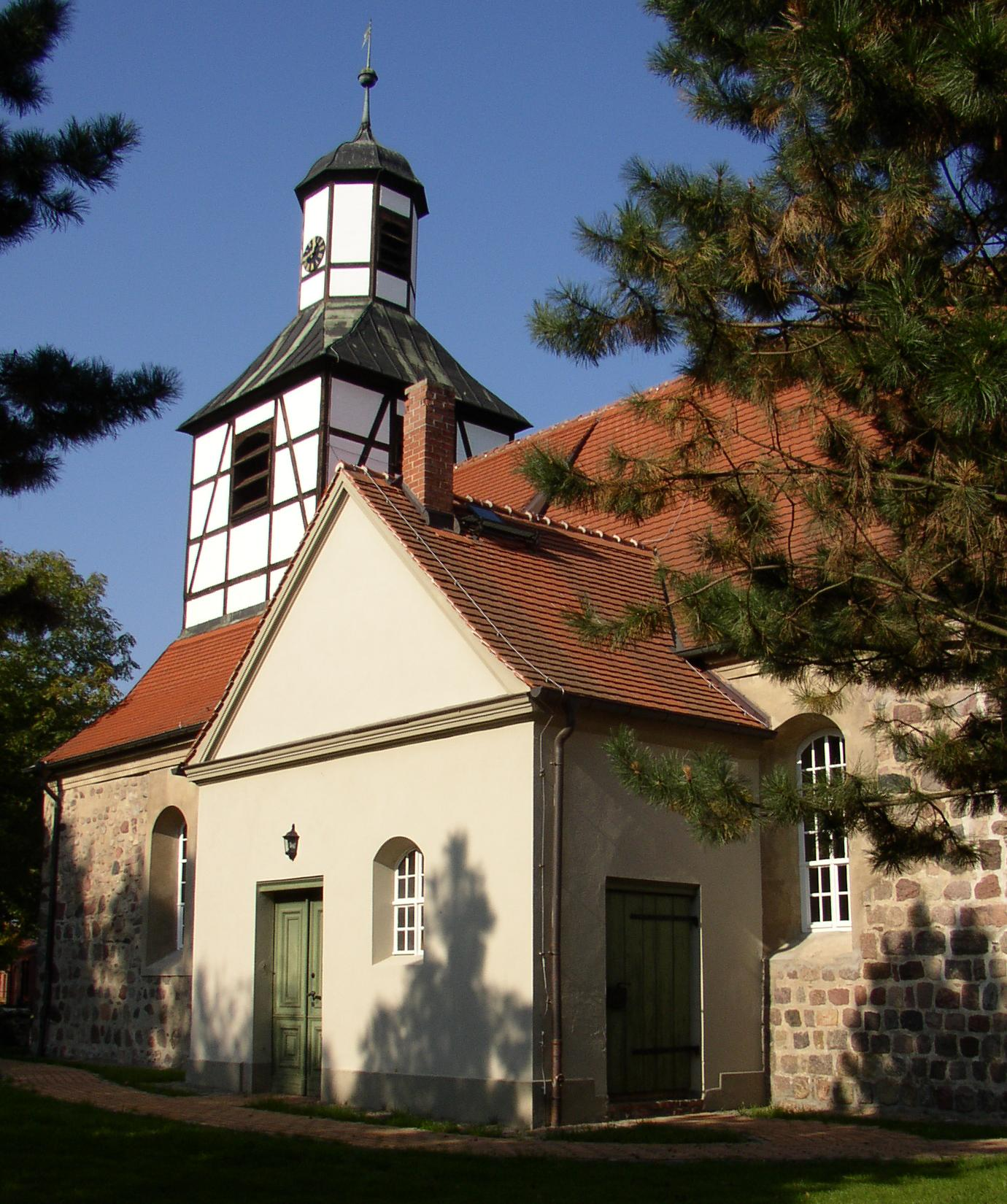
- Church in Blankenfelde

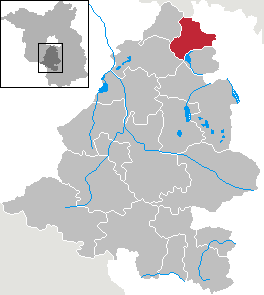
- Location of Blankenfelde-Mahlow within Teltow-Fläming district
- Interactive map of Blankenfelde-Mahlow
- Location within Germany Location within Brandenburg
- Coordinates: 52°21′00″N 13°24′00″E
- Country: Germany
- State: Brandenburg
- District: Teltow-Fläming

Government
  - Mayor (2019–27): Michael Schwuchow (SPD)

Area
  - Total: 54.89 km^{2} (21.19 sq mi)
- Elevation: 43 m (141 ft)

Population (2025-12-31)
  - Total: 29,280
  - Density: 533.4/km^{2} (1,382/sq mi)
- Time zone: UTC+01:00 (CET)
  - Summer (DST): UTC+02:00 (CEST)
- Postal codes: 15827, 15831
- Dialling codes: 03379
- Vehicle registration: TF
- Website: www.blankenfelde-mahlow.de

Blankenfelde-Mahlow is a municipality in the Teltow-Fläming district of Brandenburg, Germany. It is situated approximately 3 kilometres (2 miles) south of Berlin.

== History ==
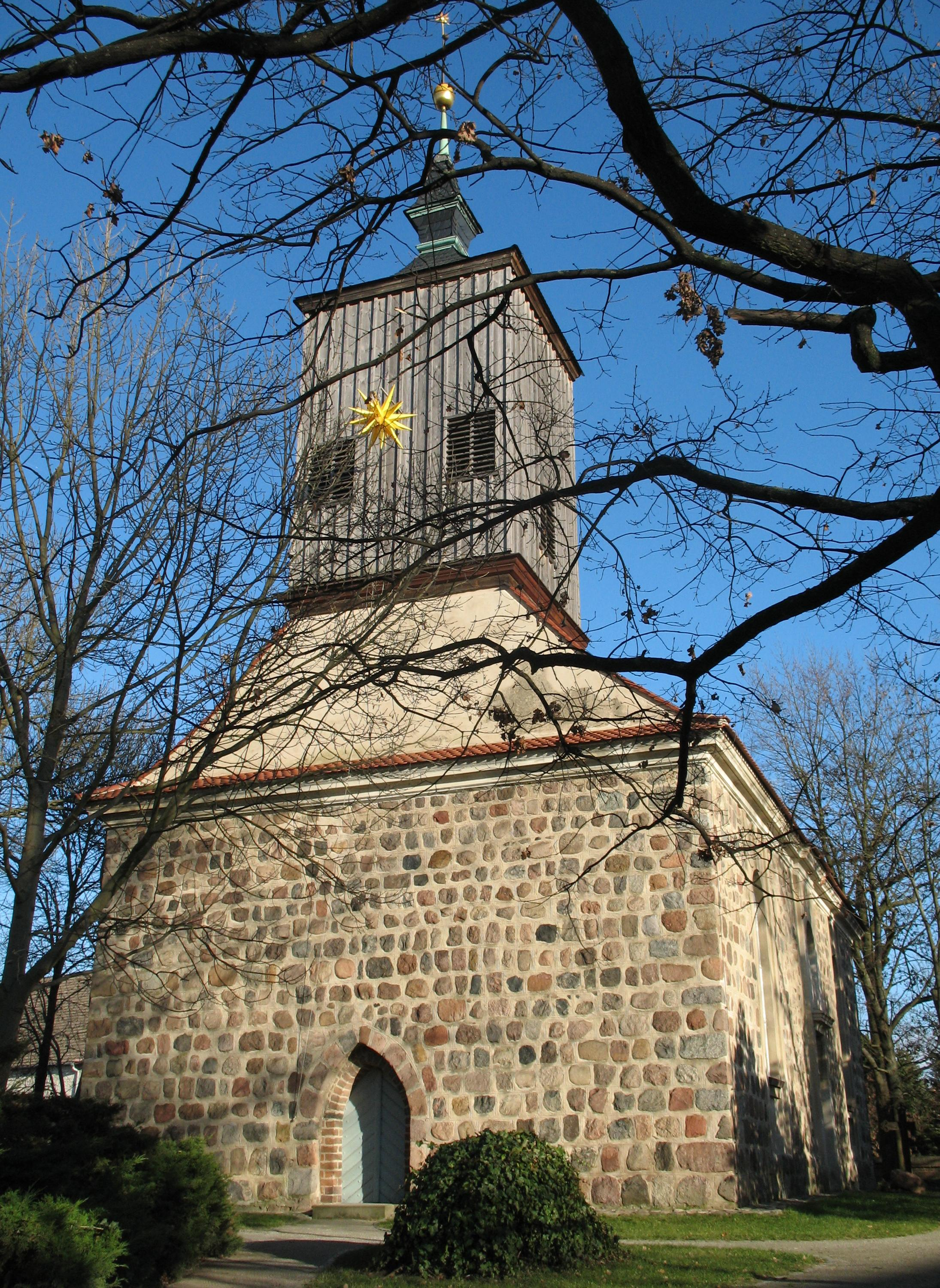
Church in Mahlow

The municipality shared its borders with the former West Berlin, and so during the period 1961-1990 it was separated.

=== Blankenfelde ===
Blankenfelde was first mentioned in documents in 1375. However, a substantial part of this district, the so-called Gagfah settlement, did not develop until the 1930s, after the Süd-Berlin Bodenaktiengesellschaft had acquired and parceled out the area. As a result, the population increased significantly - from 766 inhabitants in 1930 to 6228 inhabitants in 1939.

=== Mahlow ===
Mahlow was first mentioned in documents in 1287. After the place had received a station in 1875, the immigration of wealthy Berliners. Its constituency is under Teltow from 1945 until its dissolution in 1952. As early as 1950, the community Glasow was merged with the community Mahlow. The construction of the Berlin Wall from 13 August 1961, the S-Bahn links were cut to Berlin. Only after the fall of the Wall in 1989 did these connections get going again. On 31 August 1992, the S-Bahn connection was restored with the gap closing the Dresden railway between Lichtenrade and Mahlow.

== Demography ==
Development of population since 1875 within the current Boundaries (Blue Line: Population; Dotted Line: Comparison to Population development in Brandenburg state; Grey Background: Time of Nazi Germany; Red Background: Time of communist East Germany)

Recent Population Development and Projections (Population Development before Census 2011 (blue line); Recent Population Development according to the Census in Germany in 2011 (blue bordered line); Official projections for 2005–2030 (yellow line); for 2017–2030 (scarlet line); for 2020–2030 (green line)

Blankenfelde-Mahlow: Population development
within the current boundaries (2020)

Year	Pop.	±% p.a.
1875	1,895	—
1890	2,022	+0.43%
1910	2,646	+1.35%
1925	3,793	+2.43%
1939	12,850	+9.11%
1950	14,689	+1.22%
1964	14,431	−0.13%

Year	Pop.	±% p.a.
1971	14,951	+0.51%
1981	14,561	−0.26%
1985	14,312	−0.43%
1990	14,600	+0.40%
1995	15,621	+1.36%
2000	21,307	+6.41%
2005	24,210	+2.59%

Year	Pop.	±% p.a.
2010	25,718	+1.22%
2015	26,319	+0.46%
2016	26,914	+2.26%
2017	27,378	+1.72%
2018	27,837	+1.68%
2019	27,939	+0.37%
2020	28,606	+2.39%

== Transport ==
Blankenfelde-Mahlow is located on the federal highway B 96 between the Berlin state border (district Tempelhof-Schöneberg) and Zossen, the state road L 40 between Potsdam and King Wusterhausen and the L 76 to Teltow. The nearest motorway junction is Rangsdorf on the Federal Highway 10 (southern Berliner Ring).

Since 1992, Blankenfelde-Mahlow is with the stations Mahlow and Blankenfelde (Kr Teltow-Fläming) again with the S-Bahn line 2 from Berlin on the Dresden train, after this originally to Rangsdorf going connection in 1961 in the course of the construction of the Berlin Wall and separated was set. Terminus is now Blankenfelde.

With the regional train you can reach Blankenfelde and Dahlewitz via the Regional Express lines RE 5 Rostock / Stralsund-Berlin-Elsterwerda / Wünsdorf-Waldstadt and RE 7 Dessau-Berlin-Wünsdorf-Waldstadt.

In the immediate vicinity there is the Berlin Brandenburg Airport (BER). It is reachable from Blankenfelde-Mahlow by train or car in fifteen minutes.

== Twin towns – sister cities ==
Blankenfelde-Mahlow is twinned with:

- Bad Ems, Germany
- Kretinga, Lithuania
- Tószeg, Hungary

== Notable people ==
- Manfred Görg (1938–2012), Catholic theologian and egyptologist
- Hans-Joachim Hacker (born 1949), politician (SPD)
- Jan-Michael Feustel (1951–2009), art historian and author
- Dietmar Klemt, politician (SPD), mayor and official director 1992–2003
