= Mahlow station =

Railway station in Blankenfelde-Mahlow, Germany

Mahlow
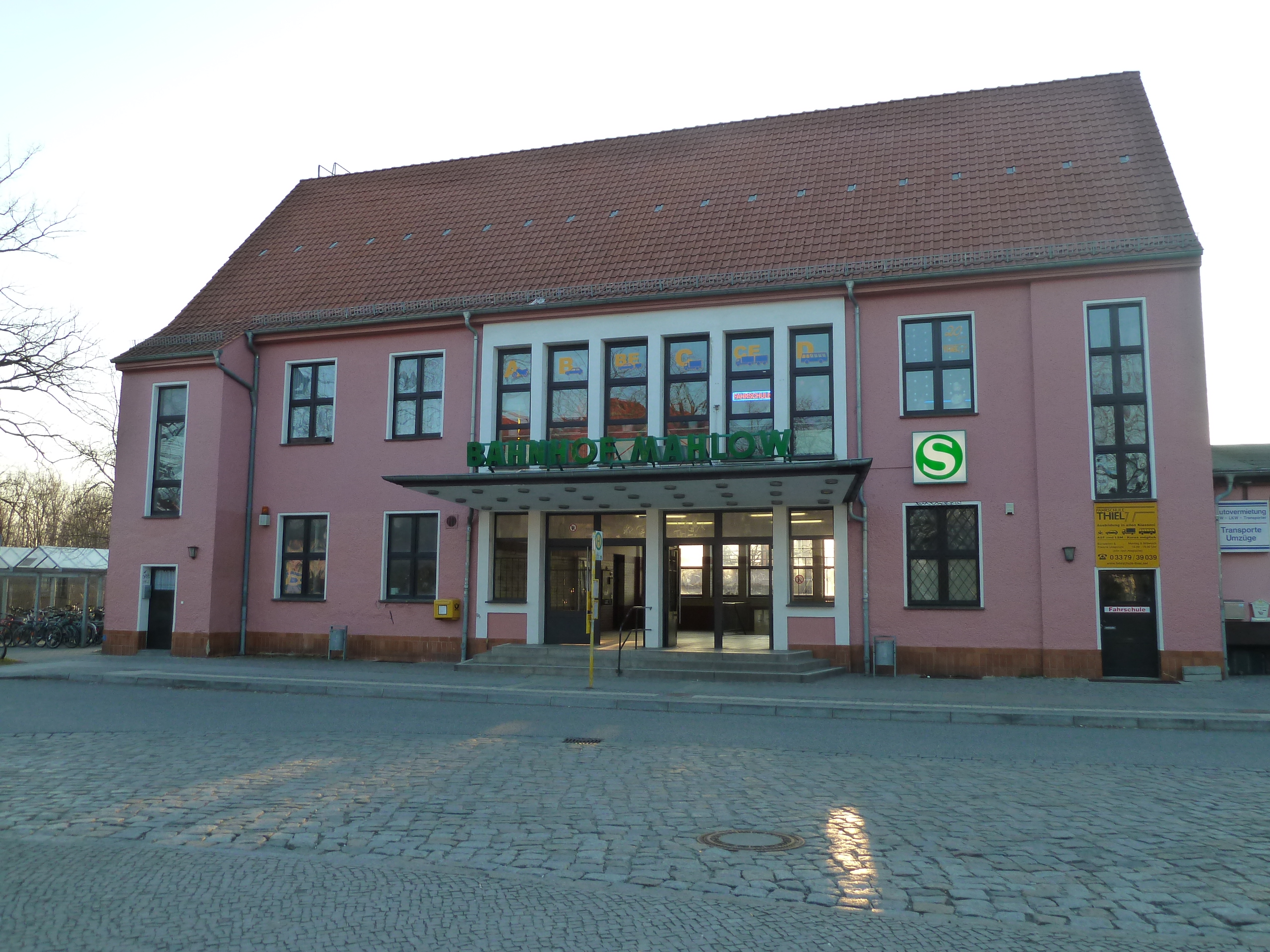
- Mahlow station

General information
- Location: Bahnhofstr.1, Mahlow, Blankenfelde-Mahlow, Brandenburg; Germany
- Coordinates: 52°21′37″N 13°24′31″E
- Owner: DB Netz
- Operator: DB Station&Service
- Lines: Berlin–Dresden suburban railway (KBS 200.2); Royal Prussian Military Railway (dismantled)
- Platforms: 1 island platform
- Tracks: 2

Construction
- Accessible: Yes

Other information
- Station code: 3891
- DS100 code: BMAH
- IBNR: 8080970
- Category: 5
- Fare zone: : Berlin C/5955
- Website: www.bahnhof.de

History
- Opened: 17 June 1875; 151 years ago
- Electrified: 15 May 1939; 87 years ago, 750 V DC system (3rd rail)

Key dates
- 1961 September 12 - 1992 August 30: operation interrupted

Services
Preceding station	Berlin S-Bahn	Following station
Lichtenrade towards Bernau	S2	Blankenfelde Terminus
Location

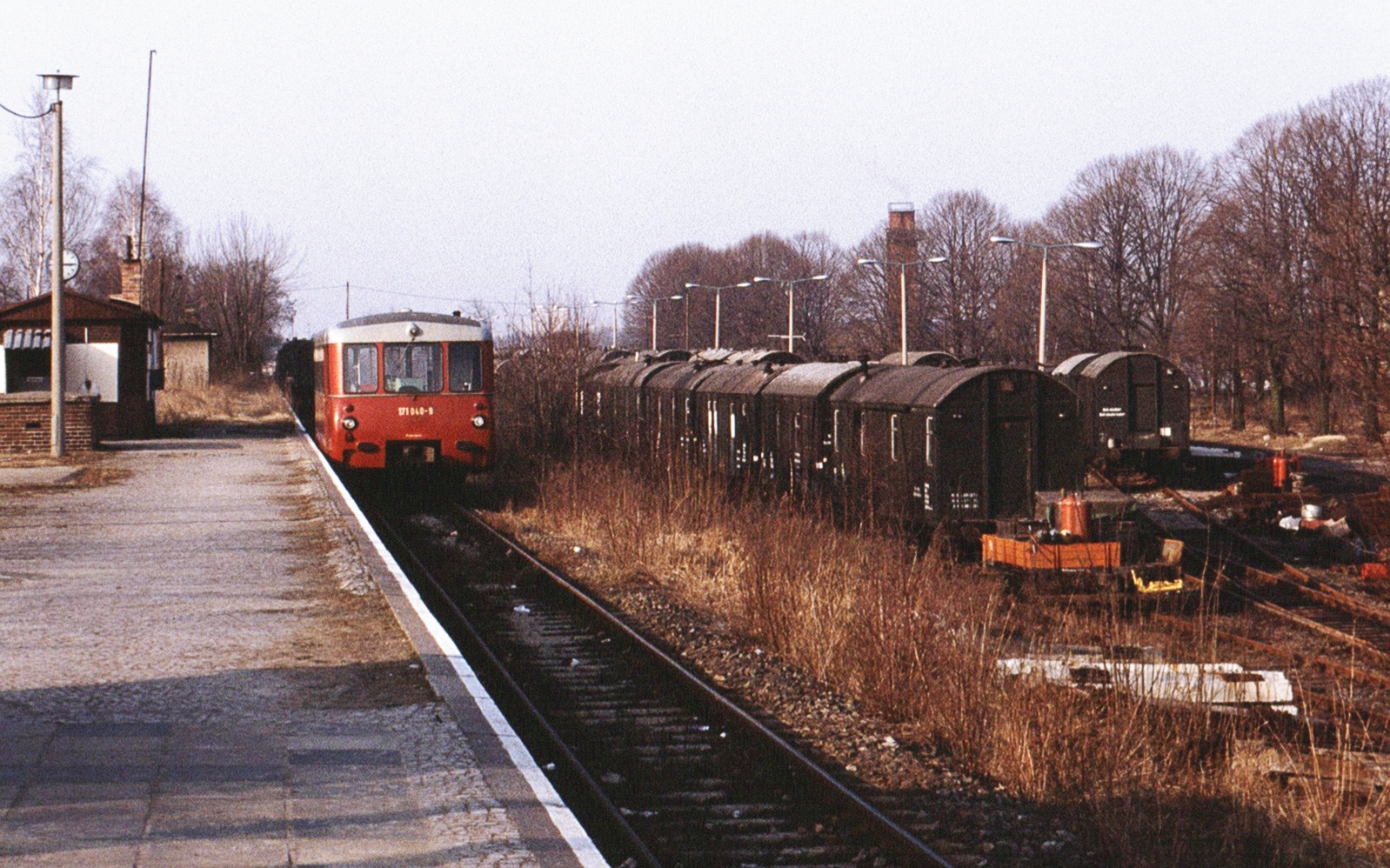
Ferkeltaxe ("piglet taxi") at the station, 1991

Mahlow station is a station in the town of Mahlow in the municipality of Blankenfelde-Mahlow in the district of Teltow-Fläming in the German state of Brandenburg. It is on the Berlin–Dresden suburban line and is served by Berlin S-Bahn line S2.

== Location ==
The station is located in the centre of the town of Mahlow at kilometre 16.8 of the Berlin–Dresden railway, a few hundred metres inside the Berlin Outer Ring (Berliner Außenring, BAR).

== History ==
The Mahlow station was opened along with the Dresden Railway on 17 June 1875. Electric S-Bahn trains ran to Mahlow from 15 May 1939 and the S-Bahn connection was extended to Rangsdorf in October 1940. The station building was hit and badly damaged in air raids in 1943.

S-Bahn traffic from the north was cut off by the construction of the Berlin Wall in August 1961. A shuttle service was operated south to Rangsdorf, but it was closed in September 1961. Instead an existing service between Rangsdorf and Wünsdorf was extended to Mahlow, but it was diverted to run over the Outer Ring to Schönefeld in May 1963. In order to maintain a connection to Mahlow, a separate platform was built at Blankenfelde station and the short section was served by a shuttle service. This was operated during the first years by a train that included a diesel locomotive of class V 15 and a control car. The train was nicknamed the "Blauer Bock" (blue billy goat), because of the blue paint applied to the locomotive and the name of a contemporary radio entertainment program.

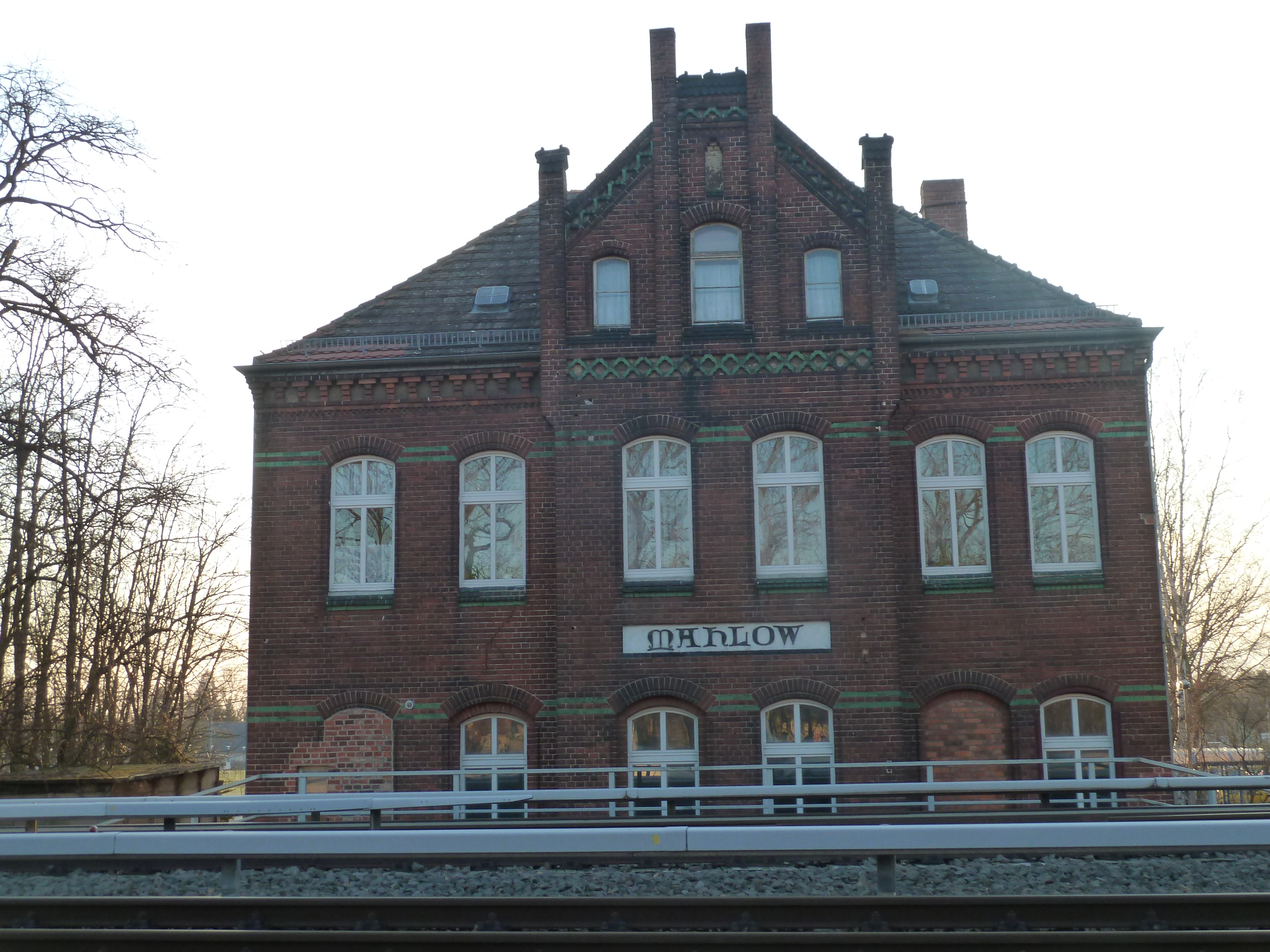
Heritage-listed station of the Military Railway

After the reunification of Germany, it was decided to reconnect the West Berlin S-Bahn network with the surrounding area. Since the Dresden Railway had been electrified with the overhead system in 1985, the restoration of the S-Bahn to Rangsdorf would have required a completely new section of track to be built. Therefore, the initial restoration of S-Bahn services has been limited to the route to Blankenfelde, where it is now necessary to change to regional services. The "Blauer Bock" was abandoned on 16 September 1991 and electrical services were restored on the rebuilt section. The S-Bahn service from Blankenfelde to Mahlow via Lichtenrade and on to Bernau resumed on 31 August 1992.

== Infrastructure ==
The station building is located east of the tracks. It is essentially a new building, which was created in 1961 and opened shortly before the building of the Berlin Wall. The S-Bahn platform is in an elevated position and is an island platform with two tracks. Mahlow serves as a crossing station, where the trains on line S2 meet on the otherwise single-track line between Lichtenrade and Blankenfelde. The disused long-distance tracks run between the platform and station building and north of the station building there is a track for loading freight to and from road transport. The Royal Prussian Military Railway had its station building on the western side of the railway tracks. It is now used as a residence and is a heritage-listed building.

== Connections ==
The station is served by S-Bahn line S2 operated at 20-minute intervals and it is possible to change to buses operated by the Verkehrsgesellschaft Teltow-Fläming (the municipal bus company of Teltow-Fläming).

== See also ==
- List of railway stations in Berlin
- List of railway stations in Brandenburg
