= DR Class 270 =

Rolling stock for the Berlin S-bahn

DR Class 270 DBAG Class 485/885
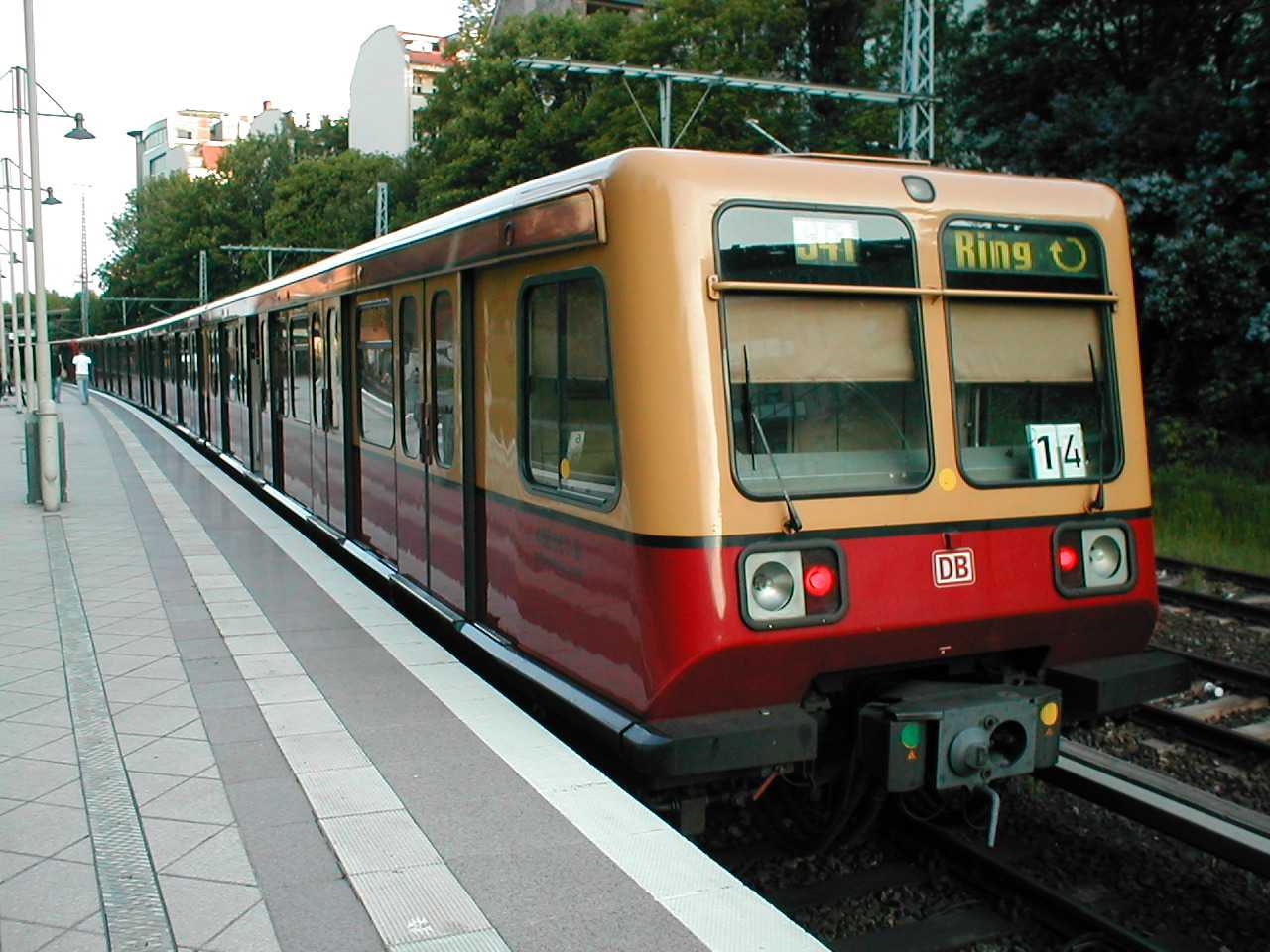
- DBAG Class 485 at Berlin Prenzlauer Allee station
- In service: 1990–2023
- Manufacturer: AEG
- Constructed: 1987 (pilot series), 1990–1992
- Number built: 166 power cars, 166 trailer cars
- Number in service: 0
- Operators: Deutsche Bahn AG; Berlin S-Bahn

Specifications
- Train length: 36.2 m (118 ft 9 in)
- Maximum speed: 90 km/h (56 mph)
- Weight: 59 t (58 long tons; 65 short tons)
- Electric system(s): 750 DC third rail
- Current collector(s): Contact shoe
- UIC classification: Bo′Bo′+2′2′
- Safety system(s): mechanical train stop
- Track gauge: 1,435 mm (4 ft 8 1/2 in) standard gauge

The DR Class 270 was an electric multiple unit of the Berlin S-Bahn. It was designed for the Deutsche Reichsbahn (East Germany) and was intended to be the replacement for the ageing fleet of S-Bahn units in East Berlin. Test runs were started in 1987 and the first batch was delivered in 1990. After German reunification, Class 270 units were reclassified as DBAG Class 485. A second batch was cancelled in favour of a new design, the DBAG Class 481.

== History ==
In 1980, S-Berlin trains were still composed of pre-World War II Class 475, 476 and 477 vehicles. Both the West Berlin and East Berlin S-Bahn operators were looking into options to replace their ageing fleets. In East Germany the LEW Hennigsdorf locomotive works were tasked with construction of new class of vehicle, which was presented at the Leipzig Trade Fair in 1980. However, it took until 1987 until an initial batch of eight cars were built for test running on the S-Bahn network. These entered regular passenger service in 1988.

Originally, it had been planned to build 300 units of this class to completely replace the older fleet. In 1992, deliveries were cancelled after only a 170 unit run. In 1993, one of the two car sets and side cars were being used for the Duo S-Bahn (S19) for a trial from the LEW Hennigsdorf.

Their train roller-blinds were changed to electronic displays, to allow the route to be reformatted into S-Bahn Berlin numbers. The S-Bahn, now unified, was planning a new fleet of trains (to be known as DBAG Class 481). A mock-up was presented in 1993 and the first production vehicles entered service in 1996. As it was planned for the new Class 481 to replace all the older fleet, Class 485 units were withdrawn as from 2003, with 50 trains being scrapped in 2007/2008. Due to technical problems on the Class 481, a number of Class 485 were however reactivated in 2009 - since 2012 a fleet of 80 Class 485 units have been in service.

The 485 series was retired from service on 12 November 2023.

== Deployment ==
Trains made up of DBAG Class 485 units had been deployed on the following lines:

- S46: Königs Wusterhausen – Westend
- S47: Spindlersfeld – Hermannstraße
- S8: Zeuthen – Birkenwerder
- S85: Grünau – Pankow
