= Zugbeeinflussungssystem S-Bahn Berlin =

The Berlin S-Bahn Train Control System - Zugbeeinflussungssystem S-Bahn Berlin (ZBS) - is a train protection system based on Eurobalises that is designed for the specific requirements of the S-Bahn Berlin rapid transit rail network. It is able to gradually replace the old system based on train stops with overlap safety.

The conversion will be finished on the subnetwork Stadtbahn until the end of 2020, on the subnetwork Nord-Süd until the end of 2023 and on the subnetwork Ring until the end of 2025.

== History ==
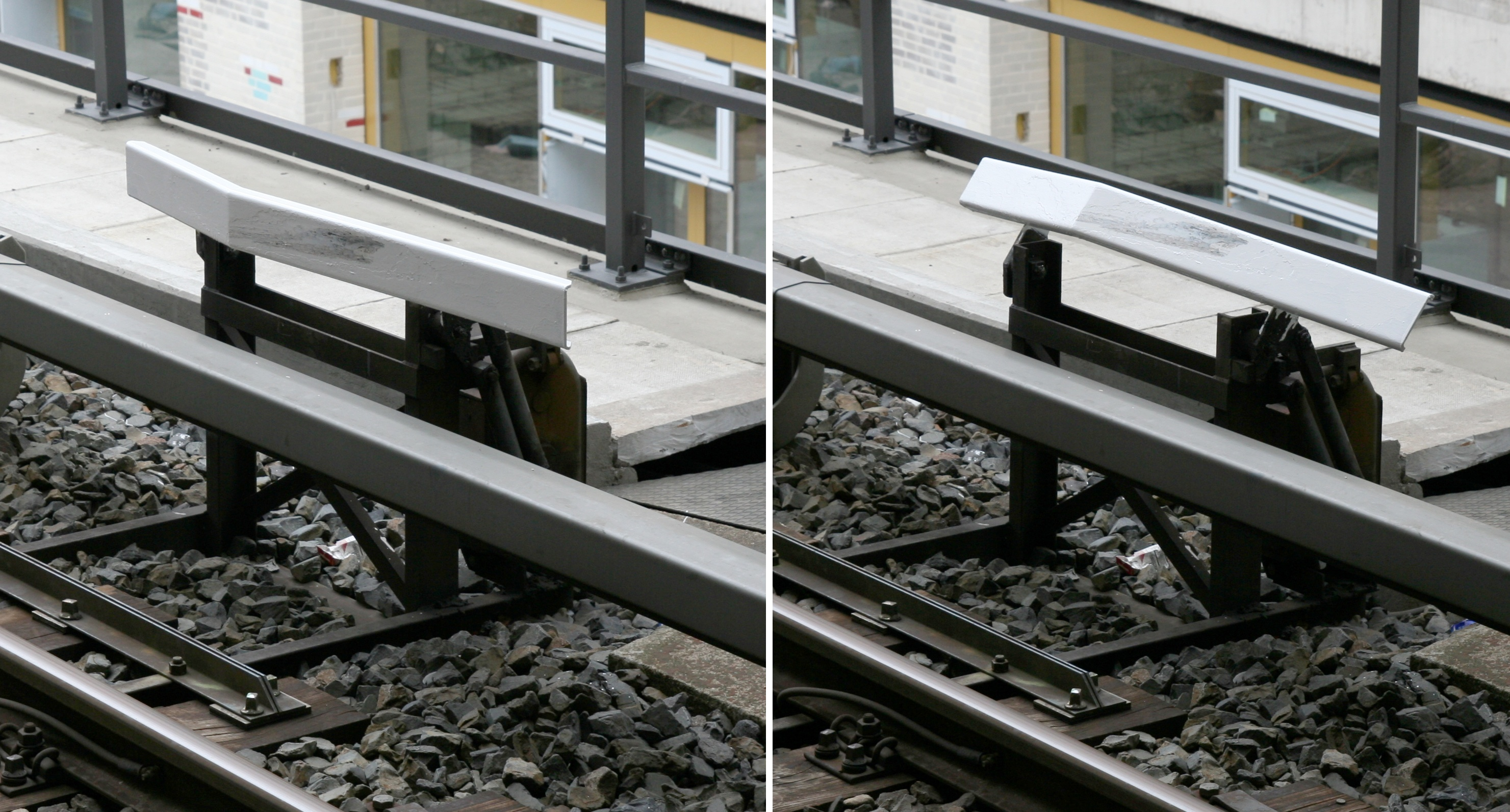
Classic train stop of Berlin S-Bahn

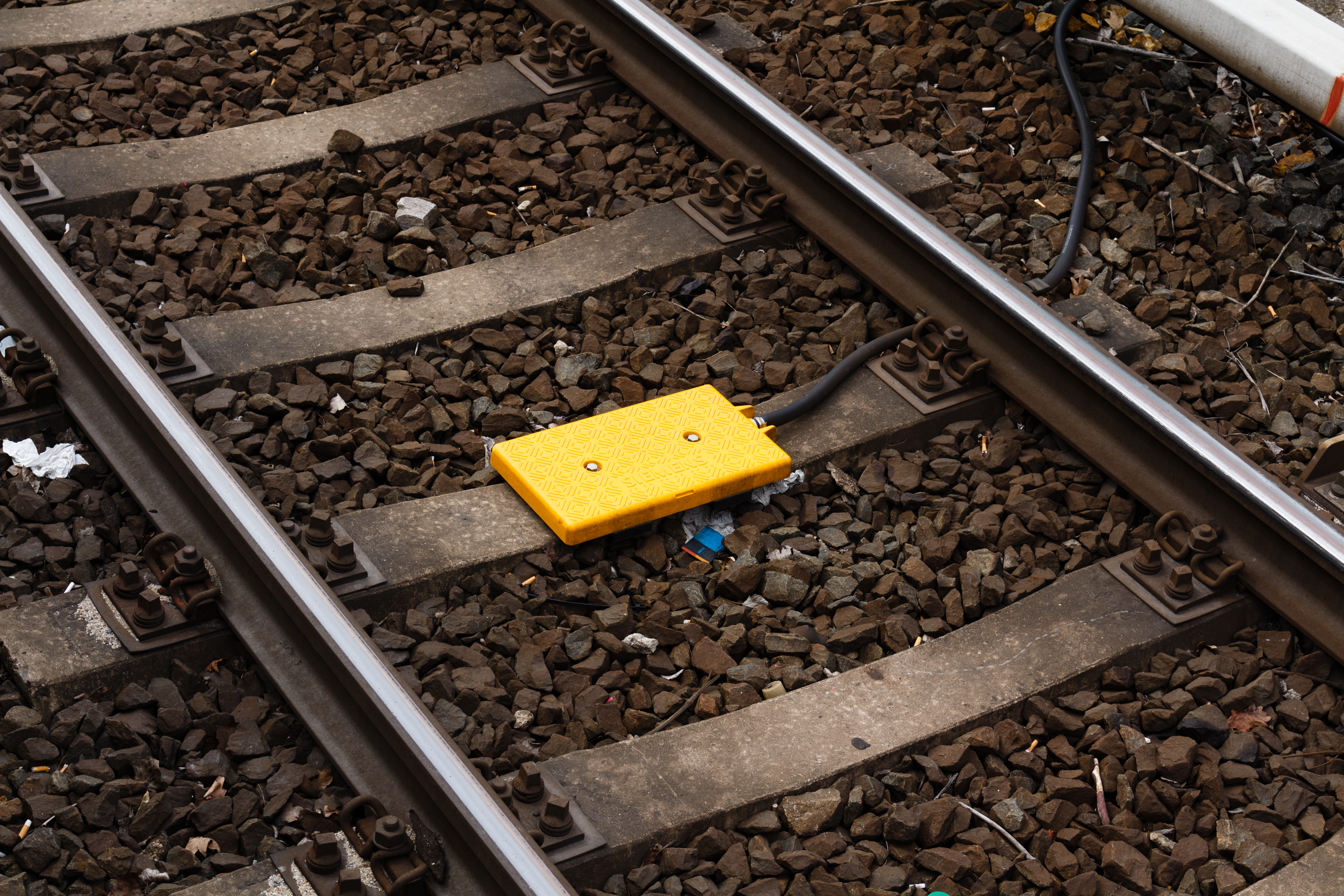
ZBS balise

The Berlin S-Bahn commuter rail system has its own tracks that is completely separate from the national rail network although most lines run in parallel with the normal railways. Although a heavy rail system the vehicle fleet is specialized for the Berlin rail network with its closest cousins in the S-Bahn Hamburg (which switched to 1200 Volt however instead of 750 Volt third rail in Berlin). Berlin was among the first to introduce an automated train protection system based on metal bar at the height of the first bogie where the trip cock is placed. (Note: later systems would not put the trip cock so high as the mechanism requires more maintenance this way.) The metal bar (also named "Streckenanschlag" / track stop collar) folds away to allow passing. If the metal bar is up it will also catch the train by sliding along the outer frame. The train stops are installed at some distance before the actual critical point (junction, station) so that with an assumed maximum speed the train can be halted.

The old system had worked for almost a century although there were a number of exceptions - notably the train speed is not controlled at all and the train stops have no function for a train passing at higher speed. (Note: to work around the limitation, two train stops are used where the second one folds away some time after the train has passed the first - with time and distance a maximum average speed is ensured.) To improve safety the S-Bahn Berlin GmbH (train operator), DB Netz AG (rail track operator) and Siemens Transportation System (train system manufacturer) started research on a system based on ETCS Level 1. The development was done in parallel with the evolution of ETCS since the mid-1990s and the results were first shown on the InnoTrans 2002 fair. In August 2007 a contract with Siemens was closed on the delivery of cab signaling for 600 trains and the 332 km wayside signaling at a cost of 130 million Euro.

The installation were to be performed in 20 stages over a period starting in 2010 until 2015. The first activation in daily routine had been scheduled for 11 October 2011 on the S1 line - reconstruction of all north-south lines (S1, S2, S6) was to commence in 2011. The investigation committee of the Senate of Berlin pointed out that the admission certificate of the most common traction vehicles will run out in 2017 - given the (non-fatal) train accidents in 2001 (Note: 2001 collision at station Ostkreuz, 10 people injured on October 21) and 2002 (Note: 2002 collision at station Hackescher Markt, 13 people injured on May 10) due to exceeding speed (that allowed to overrun the overlap distance hitting another train that was still in the station) it was expected that the Eisenbahn-Bundesamt regulator will require a modern train stop system to be installed during the renovation as a prerequisite for a renewed admission. Prolonging the old admission was expected to be unlikely to be done for more than three years making the ZBS train control system a requirement for any movement authority in the S-Bahn rail network presumably by 2018 and no later than 2020.

The allowance for the continued usage of the old track stops was originally limited to 2014 as it was expected that the migration to the new system would be complete until then. With a motion to the Federal Railway Authority the migration phase to ZBS was extended to 2025. The long new time frame come from delays in the procurement of a new operator for the Berlin Ringbahn tracks - the new operator may continue to run the old train types BR 480 and BR 485 (without ZBS) until 2023 when then new operator is required to have introduced an all new series of trains (with ZBS).

== System ==
Although the system is based on ETCS Level 1 it is not compatible. (Note: The manufacturer Siemens points out that its system can be switched for operating on ETCS, TBL or ZBS lines. This is foremost a software update but the cab signals are not showing the full range of ETCS signals in a Berlin S-Bahn train) Most notably, the system has dropped the usage of Euroloop line signalling - instead additional infill balises are placed between the distant signal and the stop signal. A semaphore on the distant signal flags to use a lower speed in approaching the stop signal - in most situations in rapid transit a stop signal will be dropped before reaching the stop semaphore. To increase throughput on the main lines the infill balises can send an upgrade message to the cab signalling electronics. If the train was required to halt then the train driver is responsible for interpreting the movement authority of the semaphore signal and to move the train slowly up to the next balise past the signal mast so that the cab control computer can see the release.

Using a special design allows the reuse of the old wayside signals - the transparent data balises are connected to the older distant and stop signals. Given the lower maximum speed of the rapid transit system the Eurobalises can be placed at shorter distance (every four sleepers). The cab computer software is much simpler as the weight of the train can be inferred from an assumed maximum. The sum of advantages makes the system faster and cheaper than using a plain ETCS level 1 train protection system.
