= Berlin Mexikoplatz station =

Railway station in Steglitz-Zehlendorf, Germany

Mexikoplatz
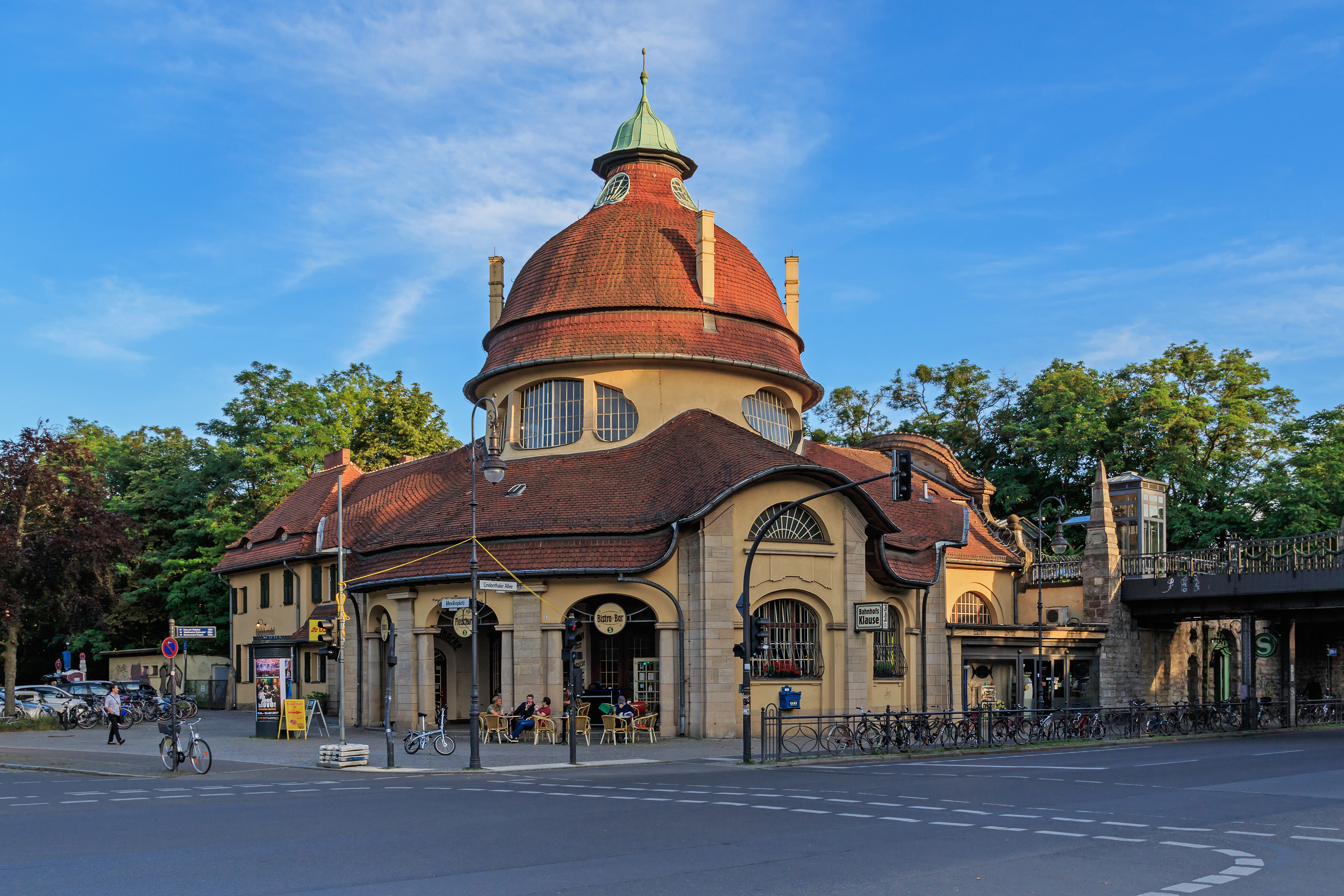

General information
- Location: Zehlendorf, Steglitz-Zehlendorf, Berlin; Germany
- Coordinates: 52°26′12″N 13°14′00″E
- Line: Wannsee Railway
- Platforms: 2

Construction
- Accessible: Yes
- Architect: Gustav Hart and Alfred Lesser
- Architectural style: Art Nouveau

Other information
- Station code: 4092
- DS100 code: BMEX
- IBNR: 8089023
- Category: 4
- Fare zone: VBB: Berlin B/5656
- Website: www.bahnhof.de

History
- Opened: 1 November 1904; 121 years ago 1 February 1985; 41 years ago
- Closed: 18 September 1980 by strike; officially 28 September 1980; 45 years ago
- Electrified: 15 May 1933; 93 years ago
- Former names: Zehlendorf-Beerenstraße (1904–1911); Zehlendorf-West (1911–1958); Lindenthaler Allee (1958–1987)

Services
Preceding station	Berlin S-Bahn	Following station
Zehlendorf towards Oranienburg	S1	Schlachtensee towards Wannsee
Location
- Location within Berlin

Berlin Mexikoplatz (in German Bahnhof Berlin Mexikoplatz) is a railway station in the Zehlendorf district of Berlin, Germany. It is served by the Berlin S-Bahn line S1 and several local bus lines. It is also planned to extend the U3 U-Bahn line here.

The station was erected in 1904 as one of the few genuine Art Nouveau buildings in Berlin and it is heritage listed. Its name changed several times: from Zehlendorf-Beerenstraße to Zehlendorf-West in 1911, to Lindenthaler Allee in 1958 and finally to Mexikoplatz in 1987.

== History ==
The station, which was built to plans by the architects Hart & Lesser, was opened on 1 November 1904 under the name of Zehlendorf-Beerenstraße. Seven years later, on 15 December 1911, its name changed for the first name to Zehlendorf-West. On 15 May 1933, electric operations commenced at the station.

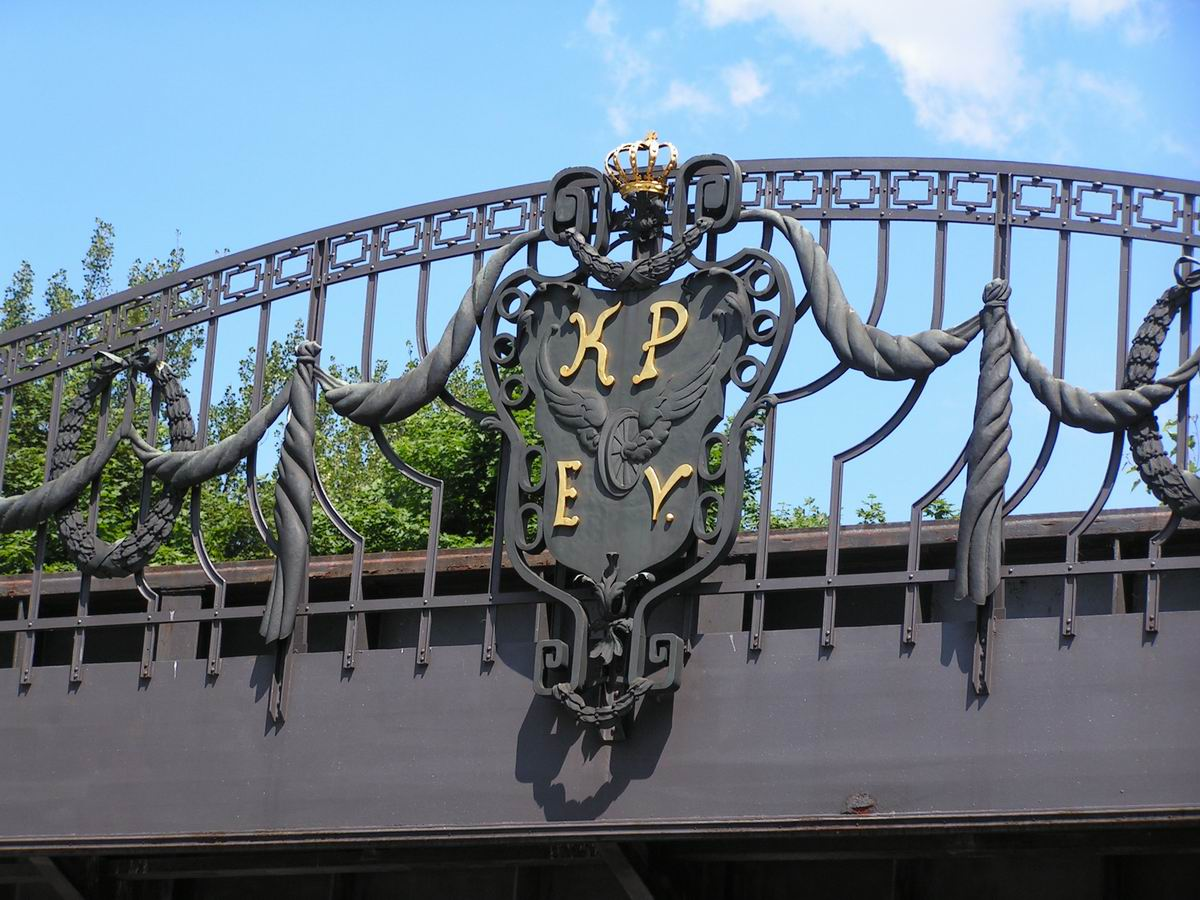
KPEV emblem

An interesting detail in a decorative manner is an elaborate emblem in wrought iron with the letters "KPEV" on the railway bridge. These letters were once widespread as an emblem, with various variants, standing for the Royal Prussian Railway Administration (Königlich Preußische Eisenbahn-Verwaltung), thus indicating that it belonged to the Prussian state railways.

In March 1934, the bridge was one of the first in Germany to be examined with the aid of X-rays and breaks were discovered in the welds under the paint. The bridge railing, including its decorative emblem, was reconstructed as part of the restoration of the entire area to plans by the architects Stuhlemmer for the 750th anniversary of Berlin in 1987.

On 28 September 1958, the station was renamed Lindenthaler Allee. On 18 September 1980, the station was closed as a result of a strike by the workers of Deutsche Reichsbahn who lived in West Berlin.

On 1 February 1985, the station was reopened by the West Berlin transit organisation, Berliner Verkehrsbetriebe (BVG). Two years later, in January 1987, the station's name was changed for the third time, this time to its current name of Mexikoplatz, which is named after Mexikoplatz (“Mexico Square”), which received its current name on 23 September 1959.

On 1 June 2001, the Bundeseisenbahnvermögen sold the station building to two Berlin businessmen. The station's bookshop, which had been operating for 25 years, was closed and regularly scheduled lectures and discussion forums in the station hall were abandoned. A citizens' initiative to convert the station into a Kulturbahnhof (“culture station”), which would have meant that the station would have become "a cultural meeting place", was unsuccessful.

== Future ==
The planned extension of U-Bahn line U3 to Mexikoplatz station would turn it into an interchange between the S-Bahn (Wannsee Railway) and the U-Bahn and give it added importance. Despite the commitment to this project in land use plans, its implementation is uncertain. It is planned that the trains would terminate at the platform of the U-Bahn station and then reverse there, as currently happens at Ruhleben station (line U2 ) and Innsbrucker Platz station (line U4). The reversing facility at Krumme Lanke station would remain. A possible further extension of the U3 from Mexikoplatz towards Kleinmachnow has been abandoned due to the low forecast patronage.

== Connections ==
The S-Bahn station is on the S-Bahn line S1 on the Wannsee Railway. It is possible to change to bus routes operated by Berliner Verkehrsbetriebe and Havelbus.
