= Wannsee Railway =

Railway line in Berlin, Germany

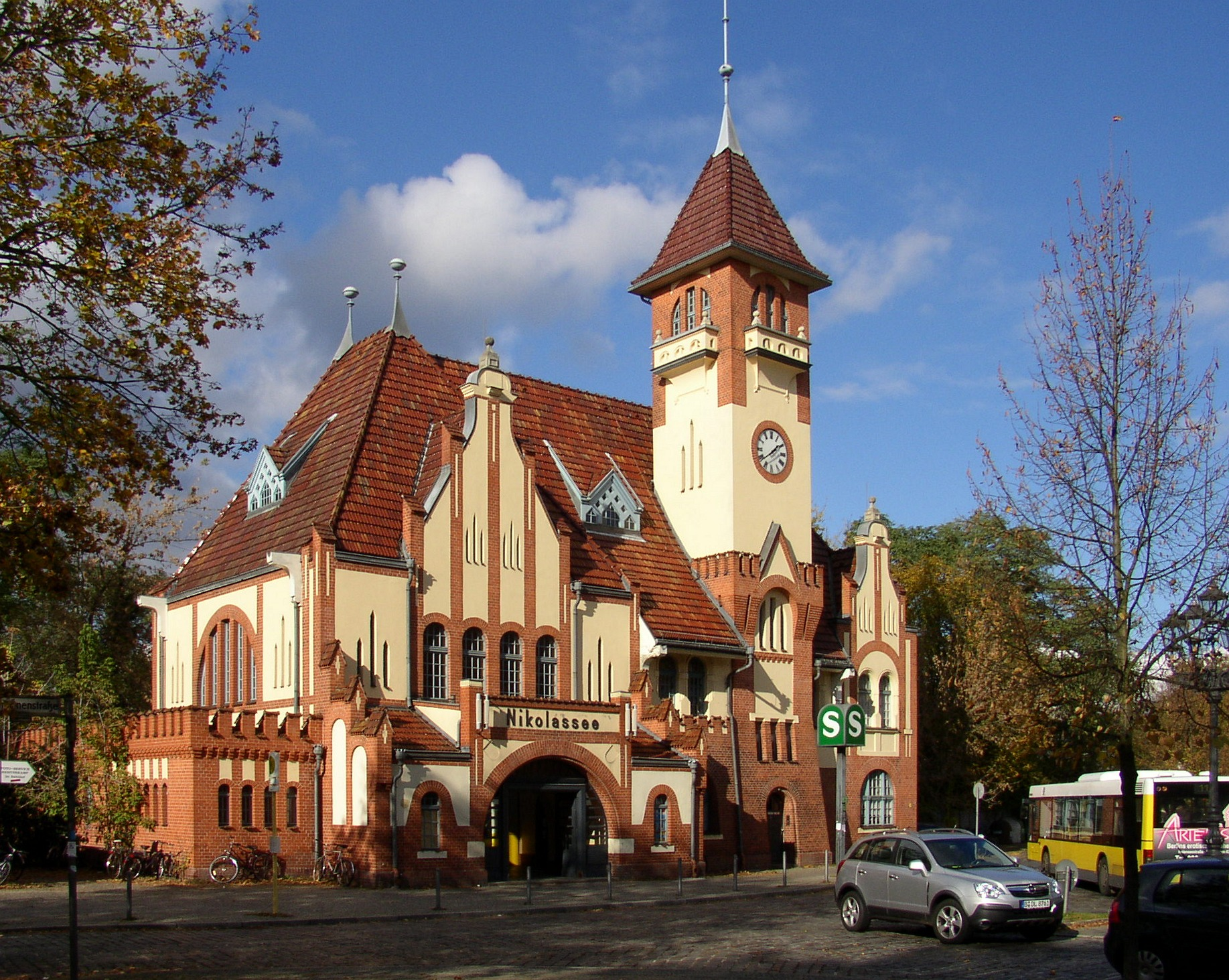
- Nikolassee station

Overview
- Native name: Wannseebahn
- Line number: 6032 Anhalter Bf–Schöneberg; 6033 Schöneberg–Wannsee; 6024 Wannsee–Potsdam
- Locale: Berlin, Germany

Service
- Route number: 200.1

Technical
- Line length: 27.8 km (17.3 mi)
- Track gauge: 1,435 mm (4 ft 8 1/2 in) standard gauge
- Electrification: 750 V third rail

The Wannsee Railway (German: Wannseebahn) is a suburban railway in Berlin running from Potsdamer Platz via the Ring line station of Schöneberg to Wannsee station on Großer Wannsee, a lake after which it is named. Today it is a section of the Berlin S-Bahn line S1.

== History ==
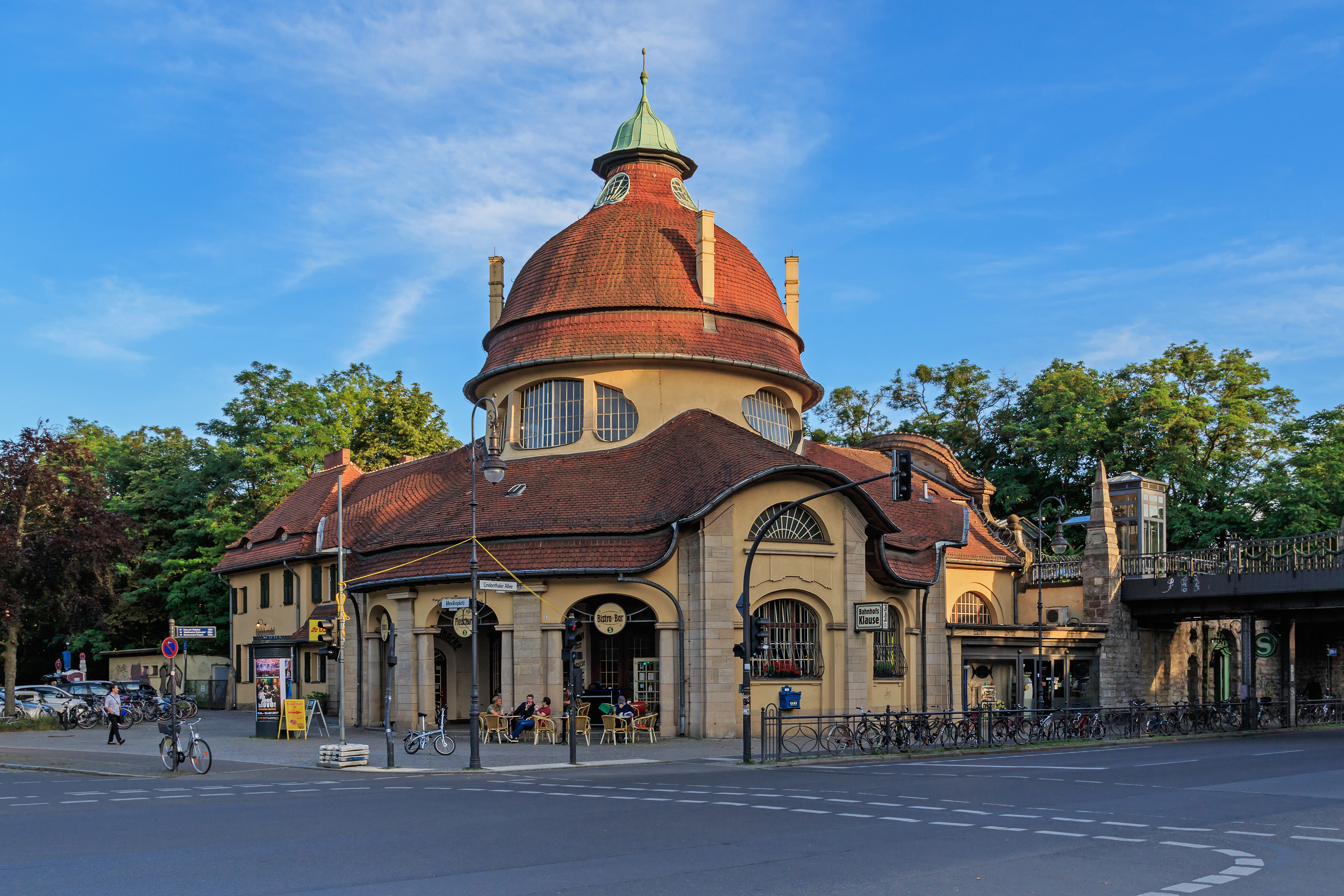
Mexikoplatz station

=== Beginnings ===
The original section of the Wannsee Railway was built in 1874 and branched off at Zehlendorf from the Potsdam trunk line and rejoined the line at the current Griebnitzsee station. After the opening of the Lichterfelde West station on the trunk line in 1872 to serve the new suburb of mansions only (villa colony, German: Villenkolonie) of Lichterfelde-West, the new emerging suburbs of Schlachtensee, Wannsee and Düppel sought their own rail connection.

The official opening of the extension was made on 1 June 1874. Unlike the new Lichterfelde West station, which was completely financed by the builder of the villa colony, Johann Anton Wilhelm von Carstenn, the planning and construction of the new stations was carried out by the railway company and the Prussian government.

On 1 October 1891, the new Wannsee Railway opened as the first suburban route in Germany, separated from the main line and having its own fare structure. Separate tracks for long-distance and suburban services were built between Potsdamer Bahnhof (near the current Potsdamer Platz station) and Zehlendorf and between Wannsee and Potsdam, the suburban tracks running west of the mainline tracks. Also to the west of Potsdamer Bahnhof, and set back south by some 300 meters, a separate station for Wannsee line services called Wannsee Bahnhof was established.

From 13 July 1900 to 1 July 1902 the first trials of 750 volt direct current electrification with top-contact third rail were carried out between Berlin and Zehlendorf mixed with continued operation of steam trains to Potsdam.

In 1903 services of special trains (later called bankers’ trains, German: Bankierszüge) ran non-stop from Berlin to Zehlendorf. The mixing of stopping and non-stopping trains on the first section of the Wannsee line to Zehlendorf caused problems. Therefore, from 1907 these trains ran on the main line to Zehlendorf, where they switched to the suburban tracks. Those train terminated in the main line station of Potsdamer Bahnhof, not the separate Wannsee-station. Suburban trains from Werder (Havel) via the Potsdam-Zehlendorf main line tracks took the same path.

Between 1911 and 1912 the old at-grade connection to the Wannsee track at Zehlendorf was replaced by a grade-separated crossing.

=== Electrification ===
The Wannsee railway was operated until 1933 with steam trains.

After the completion of the electrification of the cross-city Stadtbahn and circular Ringbahn lines, the electrification of the Wannseebahn was begun in 1932, fitting the 18.61 km long line with third rail touched from below, and also the 12.06 km length of the mainline tracks between Berlin Potsdamer station and Zehlendorf for the Bankers trains running non-stop to the long distance station of Potsdamer Bahnhof.

This project included the building of three new stations on the Wannseebahn line and a new one on the Ringbahn, from South to North:

- Sundgauer Straße in Zehlendorf, opened on 1 July 1934;
- Feuerbachstraße in Steglitz, opened on 15 May 1933;
- Schöneberg as two-level interchange station with the Ringbahn trains—changing between Wannseebahn and Ringbahn trains was until then possible only by walking 300 meters between the Ringbahn Kolonnenstraße station and the Wannseebahn Großgörschenstraße station, both further north in the cutting created for the Berlin-Potsdam-Magdeburg railway. This station was opened on 1 March 1933.
- Since the new interchange station replaced the old Ringbahn-only station Ebersstraße, slightly further west, there was now room for a new station further west on the Ringbahn at Innsbrucker Platz, opened on 1 July 1933.

Electrical propulsion started on 15 May 1933, both on the suburban tracks and also on the mainline tracks for the Bankers trains.

=== North-South transversal S-Bahn link ===
The construction of the North-South S-Bahn link, decided in 1933, and begun in 1934, involved the pairwise integration of each of the three southern suburban lines with one of the three northern suburban lines to North-South transversal lines, based on the similar size of their usage by passengers. The Wannseebahn being the strongest of all Berlin suburban lines was integrated with the suburban line from Stettiner Bahnhof (today Nordbahnhof) to Oranienburg, of similar size.

Since the tunnel section of the North-South-Link started at Anhalter Bahnhof, located to the East of the Potsdamer station, the Wannsee tracks had to change side from the west side of the Potsdam main line tracks to their East side. The section of the line between the Schöneberg station and the bridge then called Sedanbrücke, today Julius-Leber-Brücke, was identified as the best place for this side switching, which was to be achieved by a tunnel for the suburban tracks under the mainline tracks, called the Wannseebahntunnel.

Switching sides at that place left the Großgörschenstraße Wannseebahn-station without its trains. It was to be replaced by a new station running south from Yorckstraße to Großgörschenstraße, while the old Großgörschenstraße extended south from the eponymous street.

The plan was to combine the Ringbahn switch-back line to the Potsdam Ringbahnhof with the Wannsee suburban line in a directional manner, converting the existing Ringbahn station Kolonnenstraße into an exchange station with two platforms, the Wannsee tracks using the inner platform edges, and the Ringbahn tracks using the outer tracks and platform edges. Construction started in 1936.

The plans were cut short by the announcement, on 30 January 1937, of Hitler's plans for a Welthauptstadt Germania which entailed also grand plans for a vast reorganisation of Berlin's railway network. The work for the North-South S-Bahn link was interrupted for several months to change the construction plans, calling off all not yet completely finished works which might contradict those Germania plans. As a result, the unifying of Wannsee and Ring tracks at Sedanbrücke was not realised. Today a new station, Berlin Julius-Leber-Brücke station is located near the site of the old Kolonnenstraße station.

After the grand opening of the underground Berlin Anhalter Bahnhof station on 6 October 1939, the merged diameter line ran thru the new tunnel between Wannsee and Oranienburg via Potsdamer Platz, Unter den Linden, Friedrichstrasse and Stettiner Bahnhof. Tracks had to be shifted at 17 places during one night's work in the section between Schöneberg station and the new tunnel in order to establish the new track paths.

The bankers’ and Werder trains continued to operate to the terminal Potsdamer mainline station until 1944, when that station was closed for good.

=== War and post war ===
At the end of World War II the north-south tunnel was flooded due to bombing of the ceiling of the tunnel under the Landwehr Canal. There was also damage to the passage under the Spree. The trains of the Wannsee railway had to operate until the summer of 1946 to the above-ground Ring line and suburban stations at Potsdamer Bahnhof; passengers then transferred walking to the underground Potsdamer Platz station to travel further north.

It was only after the complete repair of the tunnel sections allowing continuous operations through the tunnel in November 1947 that Wannsee railway trains resumed services to Oranienburg. After the construction of Berlin Wall in 1961 the line was cut back to Wannsee–Frohnau while trains no longer stopped at the East Berlin underground stations (except for Friedrichstrasse station, which functioned as a border crossing and transfer to the Stadtbahn).

After a strike by West Berlin employees of the East German Railways in 1980 passenger service were not resumed on the Wannsee line. It continued to serve, however, as a connection to the Wannsee depot for the remaining West Berlin S-Bahn trains operating through the north-south tunnel on services between Lichtenrade or Lichterfelde Süd and Heiligensee.

After West Berlin’s takeover of the western S-Bahn network on 9 January 1984 it was decided to put the Wannsee line back in operation. Extensive work was required at stations in particular. It was reopened as line S1 on 1 February 1985.

Today, the Wannsee line is again an important link from the south-western residential areas to central Berlin. Since the fall of the Berlin Wall it forms part of the S1 line between Wannsee and Oranienburg. Traffic has increased steadily, so that, in addition to the 10-minute interval basic service, for several years extra services have operated in the peak hour.

== Sources ==
- Udo Dittfurth, Michael Braun (2004). Berliner S-Bahn Museum (ed.). Die elektrische Wannseebahn: Zeitreisen mit der Berliner S-Bahn durch Schöneberg, Steglitz und Zehlendorf (The Wannsee electric railway: time travel on the Berlin S-Bahn through Schöneberg, Steglitz and Zehlendorf) (in German). Berlin: GVE Verlag. ISBN 978-3-89218-085-2.
- "Berlin-Zehlendorf – Berlin-Wannsee – Griebnitzsee (Wannseebahn)" (in German). beefland.
