= HVG =

HVG may refer to:

- Heti Világgazdaság, a Hungarian weekly magazine
- Honningsvåg Airport, Valan (IATA code), Norway
- Havelbus Verkehrsgesellschaft mbH, the largest bus operating company in Brandenburg, Germany
- Hudson View Gardens, a co-op in New York City
