= Berlin-Schöneberg station =

Railway station in Berlin, Germany

Coordinates: 52.479°N 13.352°E

Schöneberg
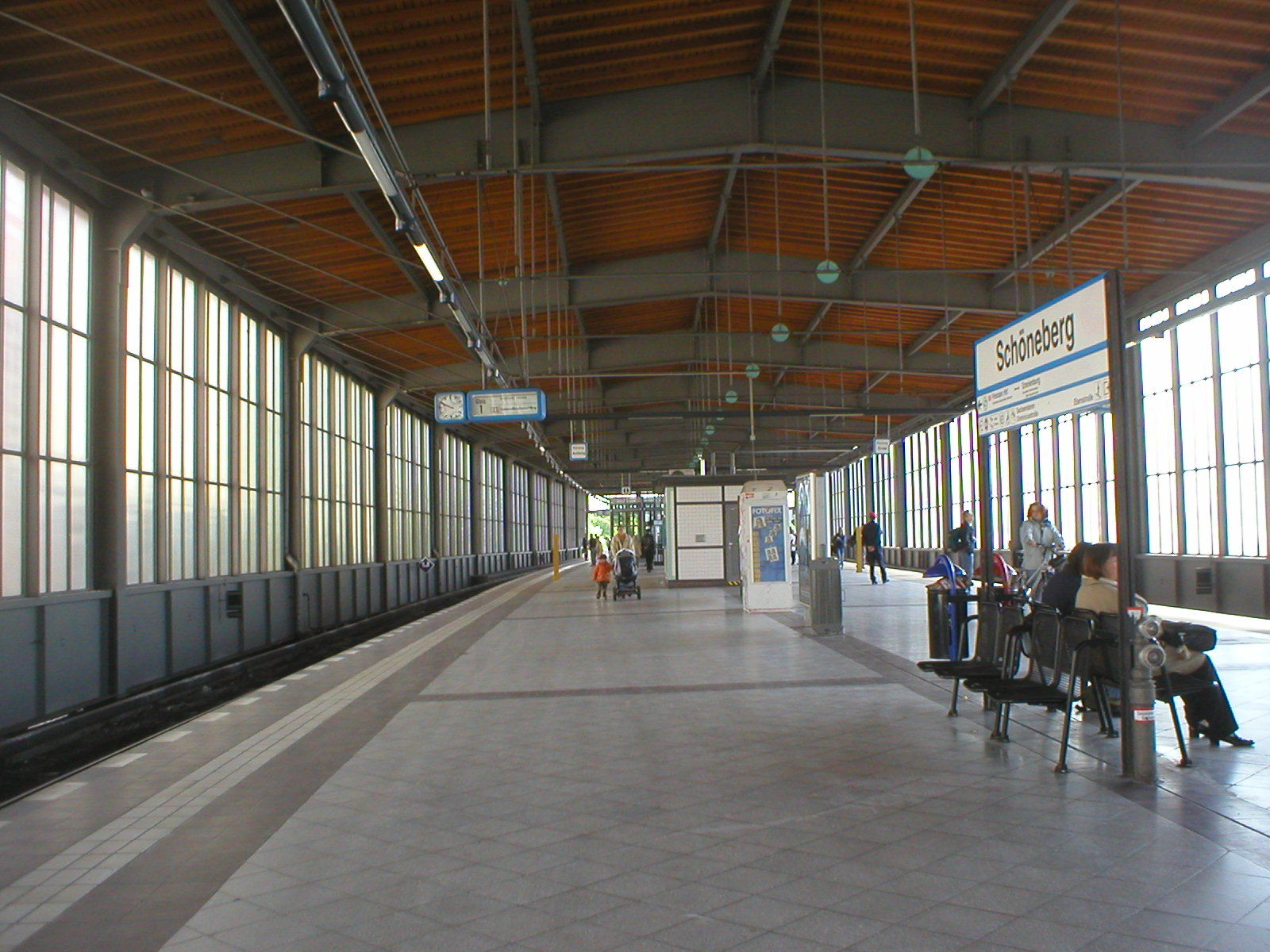
- platform on the Ringbahn

General information
- Location: Schöneberg, Berlin, Berlin; Germany

Other information
- Station code: 0558
- DS100 code: BSGR
- Category: 4
- Fare zone: VBB: Berlin A/5555

History
- Opened: 1 May 1897; 129 years ago
- Rebuilt: as interchange on 1 March 1933; 93 years ago
- Electrified: 6 November 1928; 97 years ago
- Former names: 1897-1933 Ebersstraße

Key dates
- 1897/1898: current hallway on Ebersstr. erected

Services
Preceding station	Berlin S-Bahn	Following station
Julius-Leber-Brücke towards Oranienburg	S1	Friedenau towards Wannsee
Südkreuz One-way operation	S41	Innsbrucker Platz Ringbahn (clockwise)
Südkreuz Ringbahn (counter-clockwise)	S42	Innsbrucker Platz One-way operation
Innsbrucker Platz towards Westend	S46	Südkreuz towards Königs Wusterhausen
Location
- Location within Berlin

Berlin-Schöneberg (in German Bahnhof Berlin-Schöneberg) is a railway station in the district of Schöneberg, in the city of Berlin, Germany. It is a two-level exchange station serving the Wannseebahn suburban and the Ringbahn circular lines of the Berlin S-Bahn, with the lower level serving the Wannseebahn and the upper level the Ringbahn. The station lies just south of the Dominicusstraße and Sachsendamm streets, where local bus stops allow changing between S-Bahn and busses.

The Schöneberg station was opened on 1 March 1933 as a two-level exchange station between the Wannseebahn suburban line and the Berlin Ringbahn circular railway, in the course of the electrification of the Wannseebahn suburban line. Its Ringbahn level replaced the older Ebersstraße station on the Ringbahn, which was located slightly further west. The entry of the closed station was kept as entry to the western end of the Ringbahn platform of the new exchange station.

The closure of the Ebersstraße station gave room for the building of the new Berlin Innsbrucker Platz station, opened on 1 July 1933, further west, on the Schloßstraße - Hauptstraße - Potsdamer Straße thoroughfare, with direct connection to the Schöneberg underground U-Bahn. With the opening of this new Schöneberg station, the old Schöneberg station which was located just north of the bridge which is now called Julius-Leber-Brücke was renamed to Kolonnenstraße; close to the site of the Berlin Julius-Leber-Brücke station.
