= Berlin Feuerbachstraße station =

Railway station in Germany

Coordinates: 52°27′49″N 13°19′58″E

Feuerbachstraße
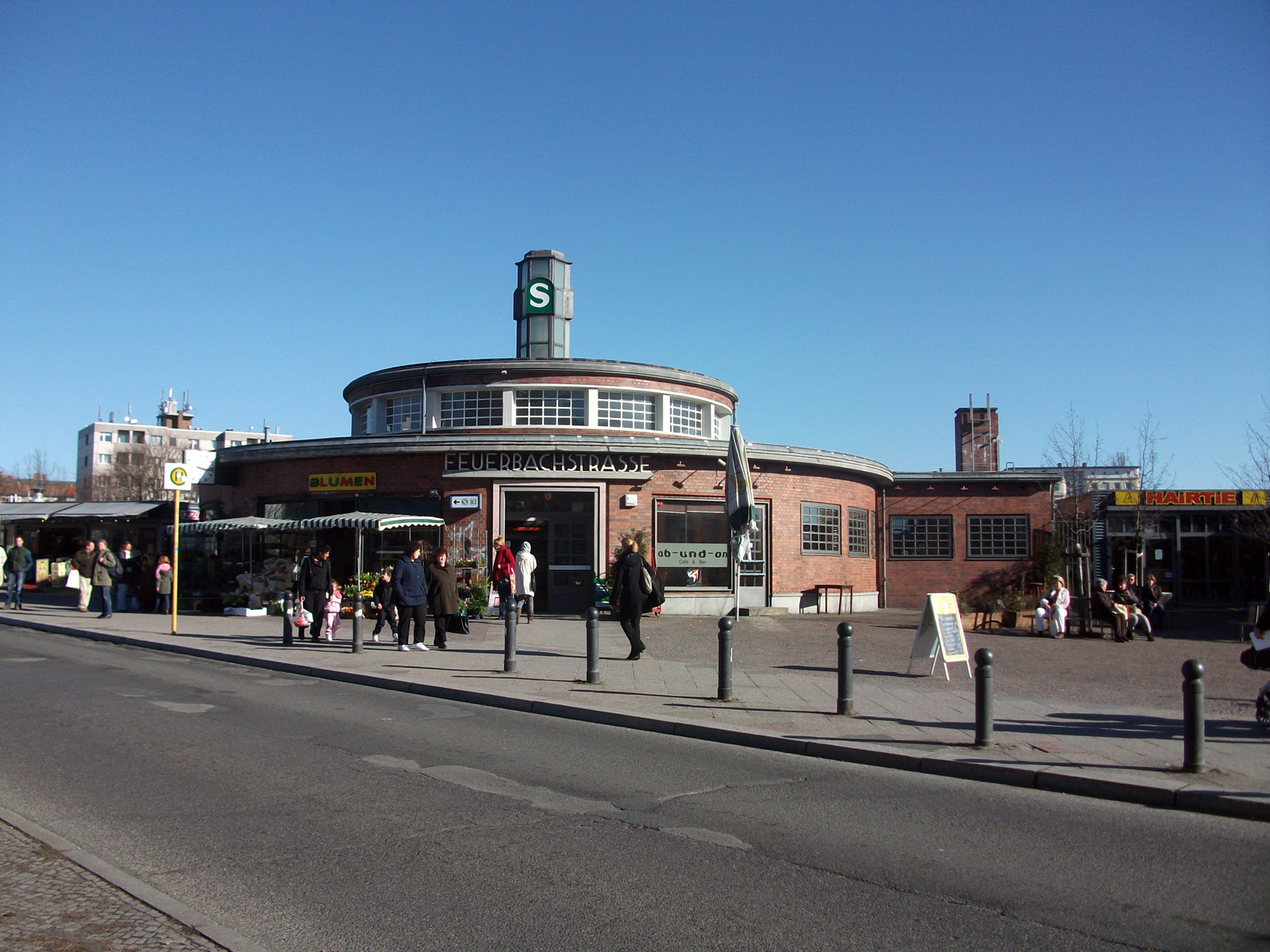

General information
- Location: Steglitz-Zehlendorf, Berlin, Berlin; Germany

Other information
- Station code: 1787
- DS100 code: BFB
- Category: 4
- Fare zone: VBB: Berlin B/5656

History
- Opened: 15 May 1933

Services
Preceding station	Berlin S-Bahn	Following station
Friedenau towards Oranienburg	S1	Rathaus Steglitz towards Wannsee
Location
- Location within Berlin Location within Germany Location within Europe

S-Bhf. Berlin Feuerbachstraße is a railway station in the Steglitz locality of Berlin, Germany. It is served by the Berlin S-Bahn, and several local bus lines.

The station was opened on 15 May 1933, as part of the electrification of the Wannseebahn suburban line. It is 900 metres (980 yd) away from Berlin-Friedenau station and 1.1 kilometres (1,200 yd) away from Steglitz station.

When the Berliner Verkehrsbetriebe (BVG) took over the operation of the station in January 1984, the station building was so dilapidated that they had to dismantle the station down to the steel frame and rebuild it.
