= Berlin Julius-Leber-Brücke station =

Railway station in Germany

Coordinates: 52°29′10.568″N 13°21′36.763″E

Julius-Leber-Brücke
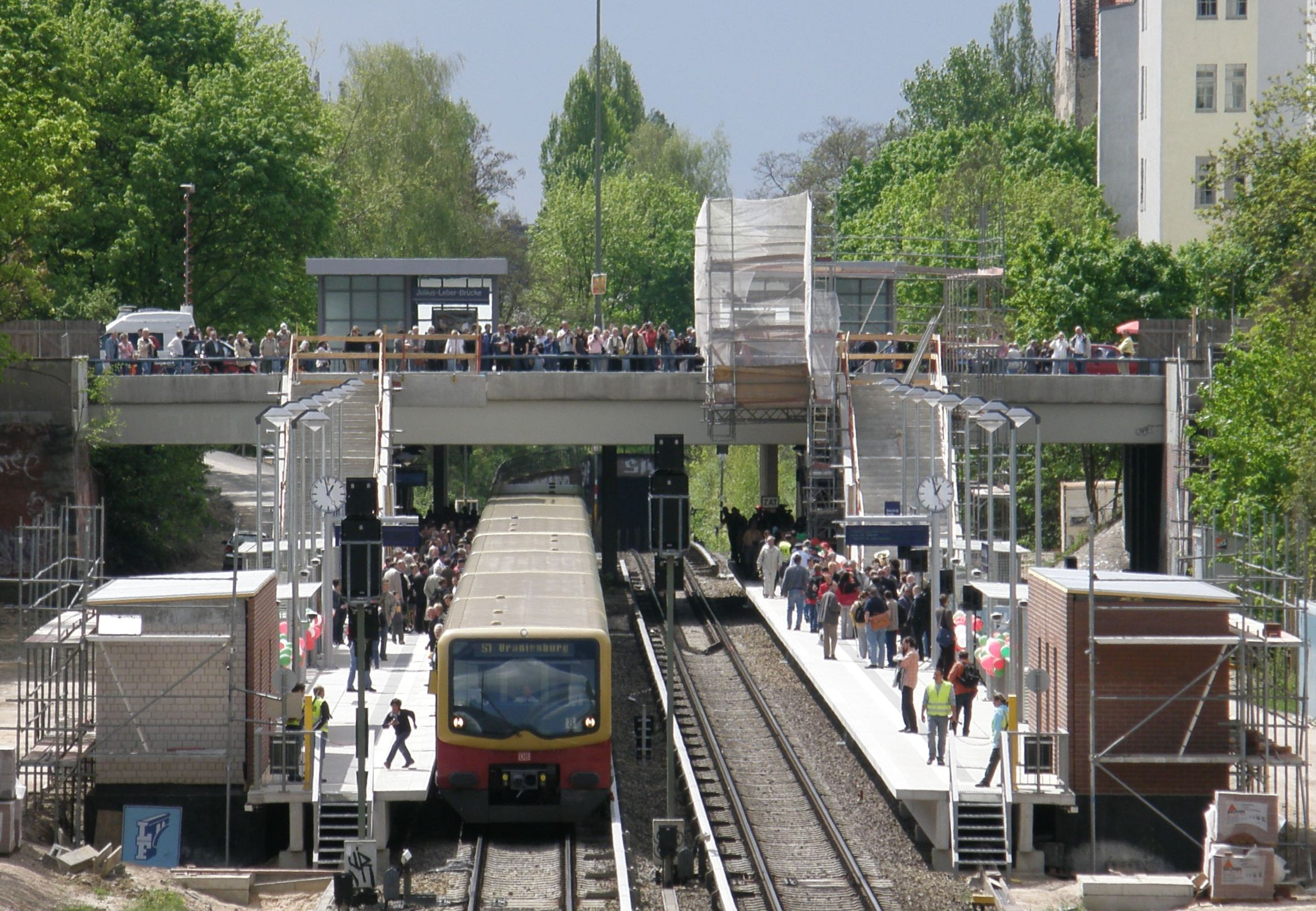
- First S-Bahn train departing from Julius-Leber-Brücke station on 2 May 2008

General information
- Location: Tempelhof-Schöneberg, Berlin, Berlin; Germany

Other information
- Station code: n/a
- DS100 code: BJLB
- Category: 4
- Fare zone: VBB: Berlin A/5555

History
- Opened: 15 October 1881; 144 years ago 2 May 2008; 18 years ago
- Closed: 3 July 1944; 82 years ago
- Electrified: 15 May 1933; 93 years ago
- Former names: 1881-1/12/1932 Schöneberg; 1932-1944 Kolonnenstraße

Services
| Preceding station | Berlin S-Bahn | Following station |
|---|---|---|
| Yorckstraße towards Oranienburg | S1 | Schöneberg towards Wannsee |
Location
- Location within Berlin

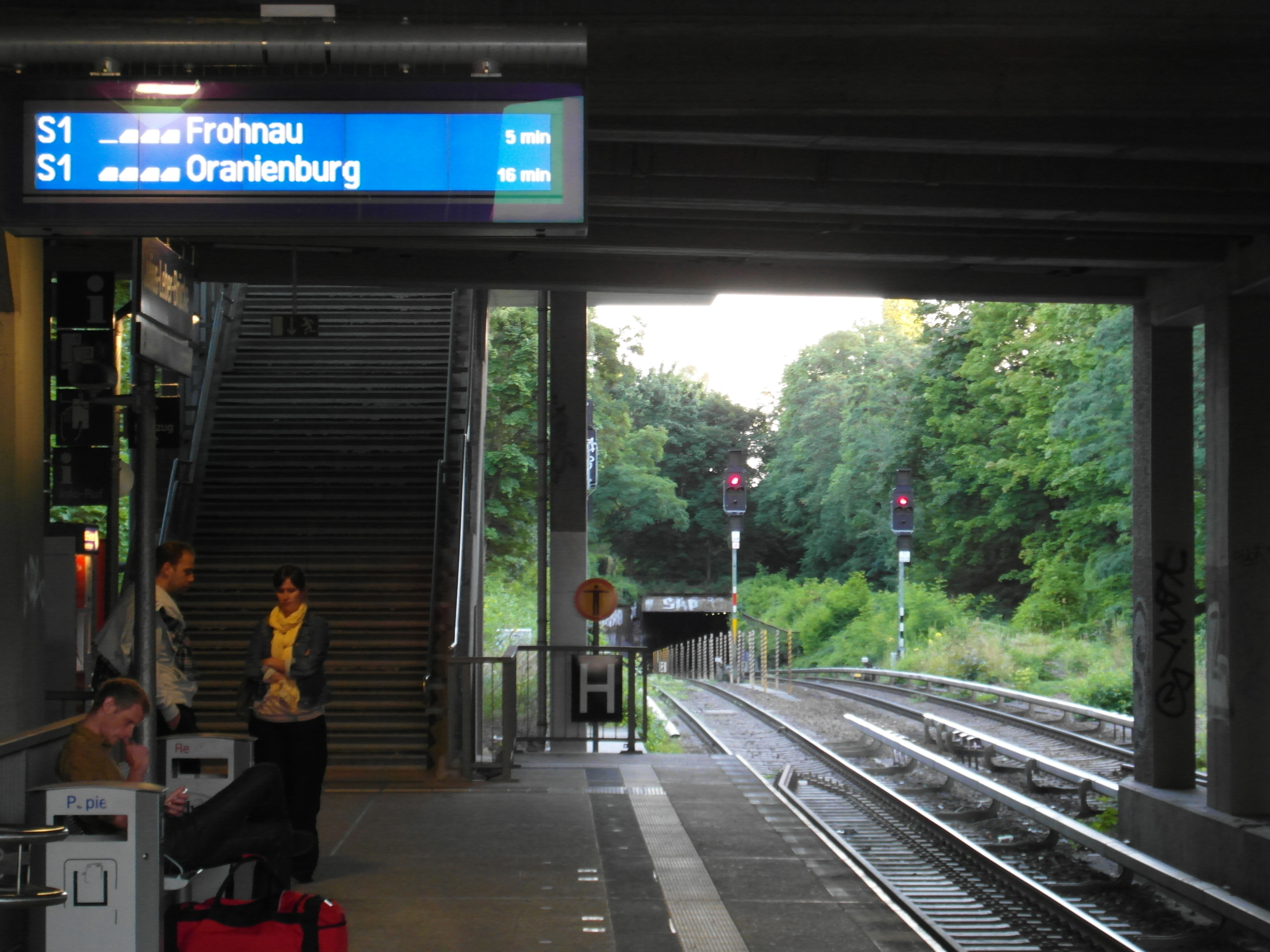
Looking south to the mound of the Wannseebahntunnel

Julius-Leber-Brücke is a railway station in the Schöneberg district of Berlin. Located under a bridge over the cutting created for the Berlin-Potsdam-Magdeburg railway. It was officially opened on 2 May 2008 and is served by the S-Bahn line S1.

The bridge is named after Resistance fighter Julius Leber. It was formerly named Sedanbrücke, after the Prusso-German victory in the Battle of Sedan in the Prusso-German war against France in 1870/71. The bridge connects the two ends of Kolonnenstraße.

The station has two platforms, of which only the inner platform edges are being used, serving the Wannseebahn line of the Berlin S-Bahn running between them.

== History ==
The station is located next to the original site of the historic Bahnhof Schöneberg, opened in 1881 at the Südringspitzkehre, the branch terminal line closing the southern Ringbahn by a switchback or hairpin turn at the Berlin Potsdamer Bahnhof, where the circular trains reversed, and could change the steam locomotives for servicing them and refilling with coal and water. In 1932 it received the name Kolonnenstraße according to the name of the street crossing the bridge, to distinguish it from the newly erected interchange station Berlin-Schöneberg at the crossing of the Ringbahn with the Wannseebahn S-Bahn line.

This Schöneberg station had a single platform, where passengers riding on S-Bahn trains on the Ring could change trains, to cut short the trip to the Potsdamer Ring station in the city center, where the Ring trains reversed to continue their circular ride. Passengers could change to the Wannseebahn by crossing the long distance rails via a foot bridge accessible from the north tip of the Kolonnenstraße station to reach the southern tip of the original Großgörschenstraße station platform, which stretched southwards from the eponymous street, and was replaced 1939 by the new Großgörschenstraße station, which stretches north from the epinomous street up to Yorckstraße and is now called Yorckstraße (Großgörschenstraße).

As part of the 1930s plans to build a North-South-S-Bahn link between the Northern and Southern sections of the Ring, the then Kolonnenstraße called station should be converted to an interchange station of the Ringbahn and Wannseebahn trains, with the old Ringbahn-only platform becoming the interchange platform between the northbound trains of both the Ringbahn and the Wannseebahn, complemented by a new platform for southbound trains of both lines. For this, the Sedanbrücke, as it was then called, was to be widened by replacing it in two steps by a new, longer bridge. The construction for a new southern half of the bridge started in 1936, which was inaugurated in March 1937, eight meters longer on the eastern end, and six meters longer on its western end. The station building on the north-eastern edge of the bridge was also demolished in 1936 and replaced by a simple shack with a wooden bridge to the platform.

This plan was, after the work had already started in 1936, cut short by the announcement, on 30 January 1937, of Hitler's plans for converting Berlin into the Welthauptstadt Germania, after which all work on the North-South-S-Bahn link already under construction, which conflicted with this plan, were called off. While the Wannseebahn tracks were moved by a tunnel from the western side of the Berlin-Potsdam-Magdeburg Railway to the east of that line, the tunnel was shortened, and the Wannseebahn remained west of the Ringbahnspitzkehre. The Welthauptstadt plan called for the Südringspitzkehre to be closed, and to use the preparations for its introduction into the underground Potsdamer Platz station at the northern and southern ends of that station instead for a new direct S-Bahn link between two new long distance stations located on the northern and southern Ring sections, and this link was to use, between Yorckstraße and the southern section of the Ring, not the corridor along the Berlin-Potsdam-Magdeburg railway, but that of the Dresdener and Anhalter Bahn.

Heavily damaged by air raids, Bahnhof Kolonnenstraße was closed in 1944 and not reopened after World War II, as the Potsdamer Bahnhof and its Ringbahn subsidiary were more or less completely destroyed and never rebuilt. Before 1950, the switches linking the Ringbahn with the Südringspitzkehre were removed.

Plans for replacing the old Kolonnenstraße station by a new one emerged in the 1980s, after the West-Berlin government took over the running of the S-Bahn in Westberlin. A plan was developed to divert the suburban S-Bahn lines to Lichtenrade and Lichterfelde-Ost from the Papestraße station via the Ring westwards to the corridor containing the Wannseebahn line, the former Berlin-Potsdam-Magdeburg Railway and the Südringspitzkehre and to build an interchange station between Wannseebahn and the diverted suburban line near the location of the old Kolonnenstraße station. This called for a station with two platforms, the Wannseebahn tracks being served by the inner edges of the two platforms, and the Lichtenrade and Lichterfelde tracks using the outer edges. A competition of architects was called, and in July the design of the Berlin-based architectural office Medenbach was selected. This plan did not come to fruition before two years later the fall of the Berlin wall changed the whole situation. The Lichtenrade and Lichterfelde lines were revitalized in their original places. Nonetheless, the construction of the planned station was begun in 2007, and completed in 2008.

== Overview ==
The new station called Julius-Leber-Brücke lies slightly west from the location of the Kolonnenstraße interchange station planned in 1936, because the northern mound of the Wannseebahn tunnel is located further west as originally planned, as explained above. It differs also from the old plan by the two platforms extending both north and south of the eponymous bridge, whereas the old Kolonnenstraße platform(s) were completely north of the then Sedanbrücke; without the planned widening of the bridge, the northbound Ringbahn trains had even to curve around the eastern abutment to reach the eastern platform edge.

The two platforms are accessible from both sides of the Julius-Leber-Brücke, with lifts on the northern side of the bridge.

The outer edges of the two platforms could in future serve for the planned new variant of the North-South-S-Bahn link, being planned and built under the name S21.
