= Berlin-Friedenau station =

Railway station in Tempelhof-Schöneberg, Germany

Coordinates: 52.470°N 13.341°E

Friedenau
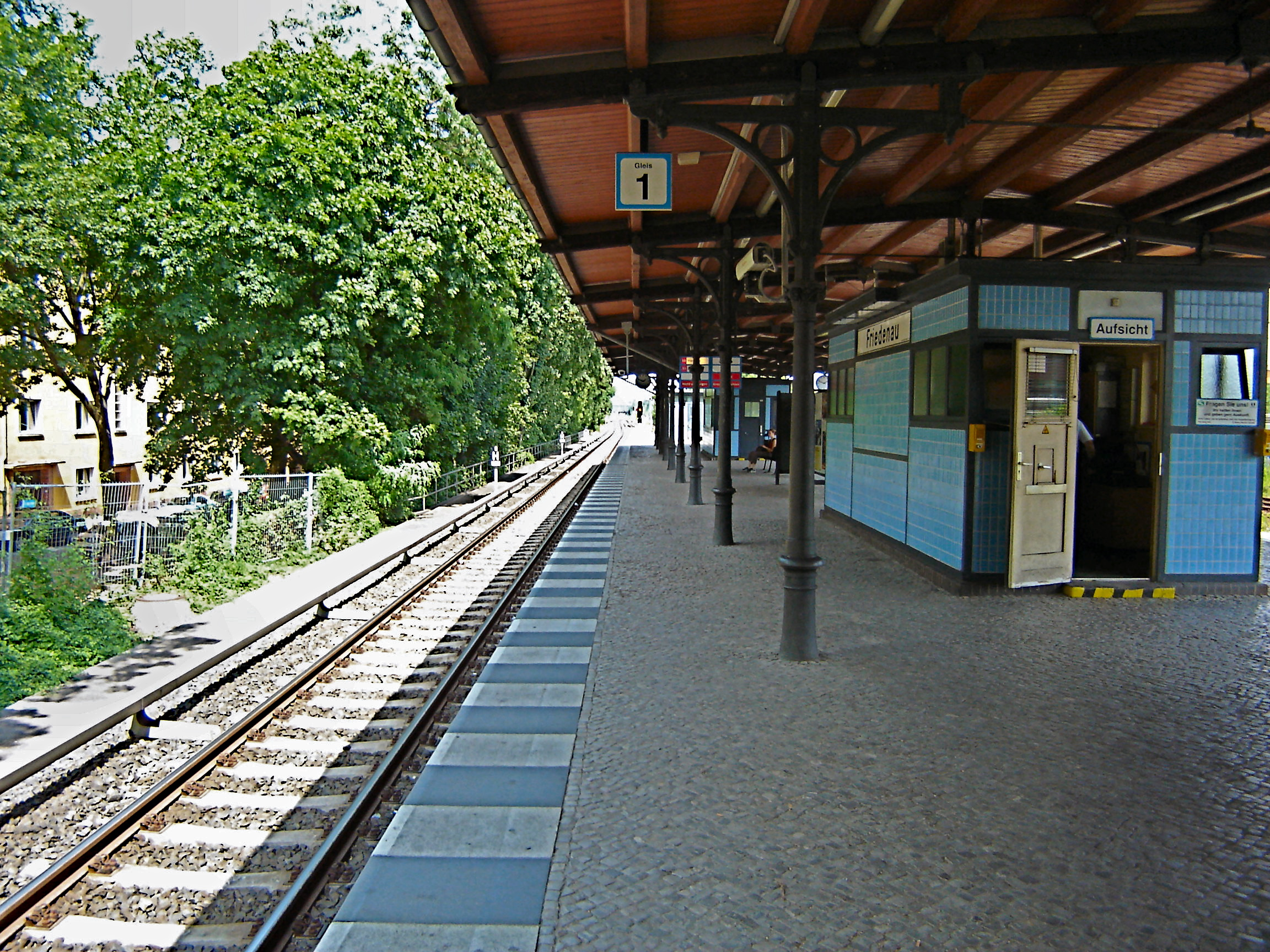
- Bahnhof Berlin-Friedenau: platform

General information
- Location: Tempelhof-Schöneberg, Berlin, Berlin; Germany

Other information
- Station code: 1932
- DS100 code: BFRU
- Category: 4
- Fare zone: VBB: Berlin B/5656

Services
Preceding station	Berlin S-Bahn	Following station
Schöneberg towards Oranienburg	S1	Feuerbachstraße towards Wannsee
Location

Berlin-Friedenau is a railway station in Berlin, Germany. Though it is named after the nearby Friedenau locality, the station officially is located in the southern area of the Schöneberg district. It was opened in 1891 with the Wannseebahn rapid transit railway. Today it is served by the S1 line of the Berlin S-Bahn.
