= Berlin Botanischer Garten station =

Railway station in Berlin, Germany

Coordinates: 52°26′53″N 13°18′26″E

Botanischer Garten
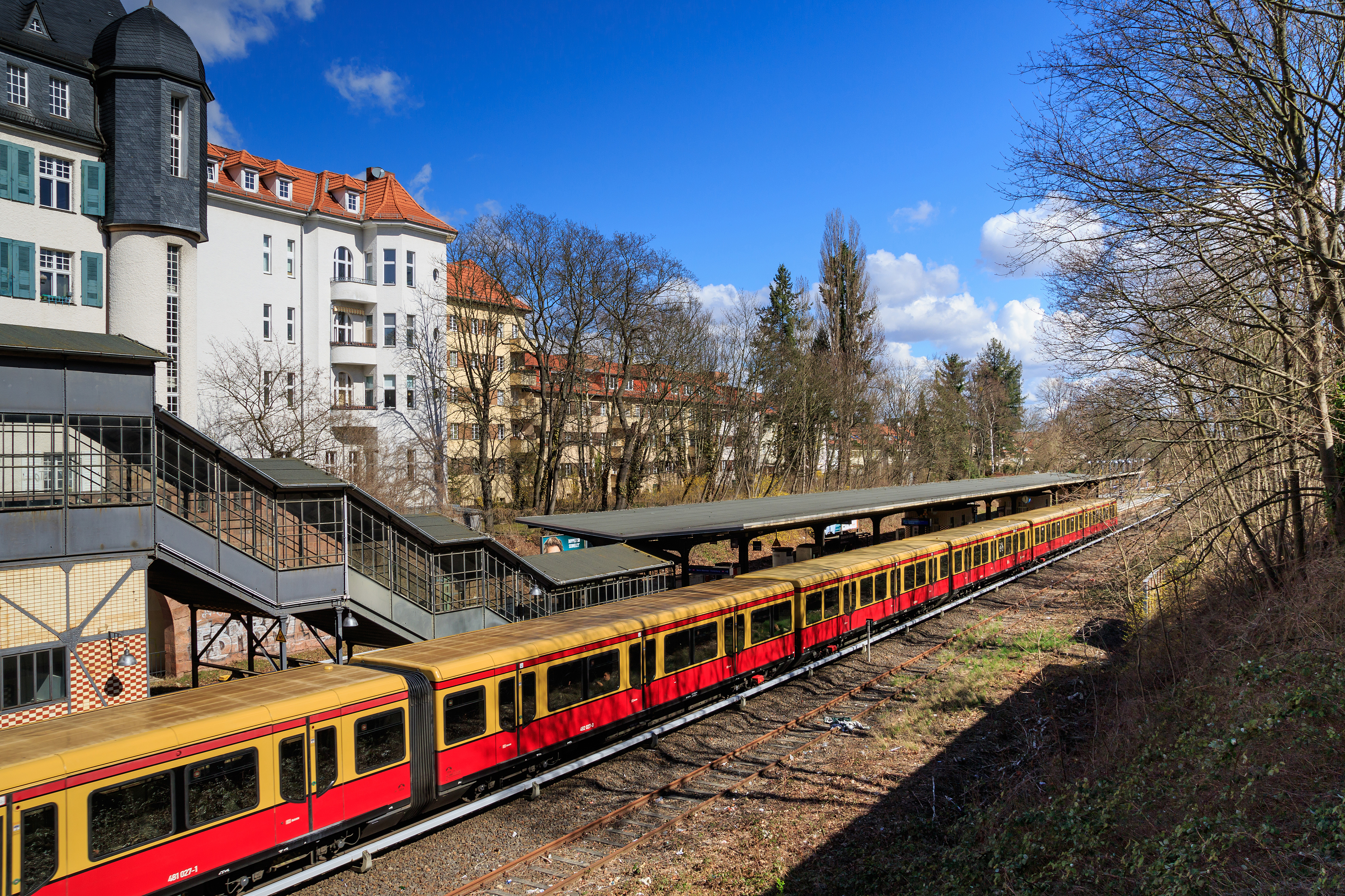

General information
- Location: Steglitz-Zehlendorf, Berlin, Berlin; Germany

Other information
- Station code: 0803
- DS100 code: BBGT
- Category: 4
- Fare zone: VBB: Berlin B/5656

Services
Preceding station	Berlin S-Bahn	Following station
Rathaus Steglitz towards Oranienburg	S1	Lichterfelde West towards Wannsee
Location

Berlin Botanischer Garten (in German Bahnhof Berlin Botanischer Garten) is a railway station in the Lichterfelde locality of Berlin, Germany, named after the nearby Botanical Garden. It is served by the Berlin S-Bahn and several local bus lines.
