= Prussian State Railways =

Railway companies in the state of Prussia

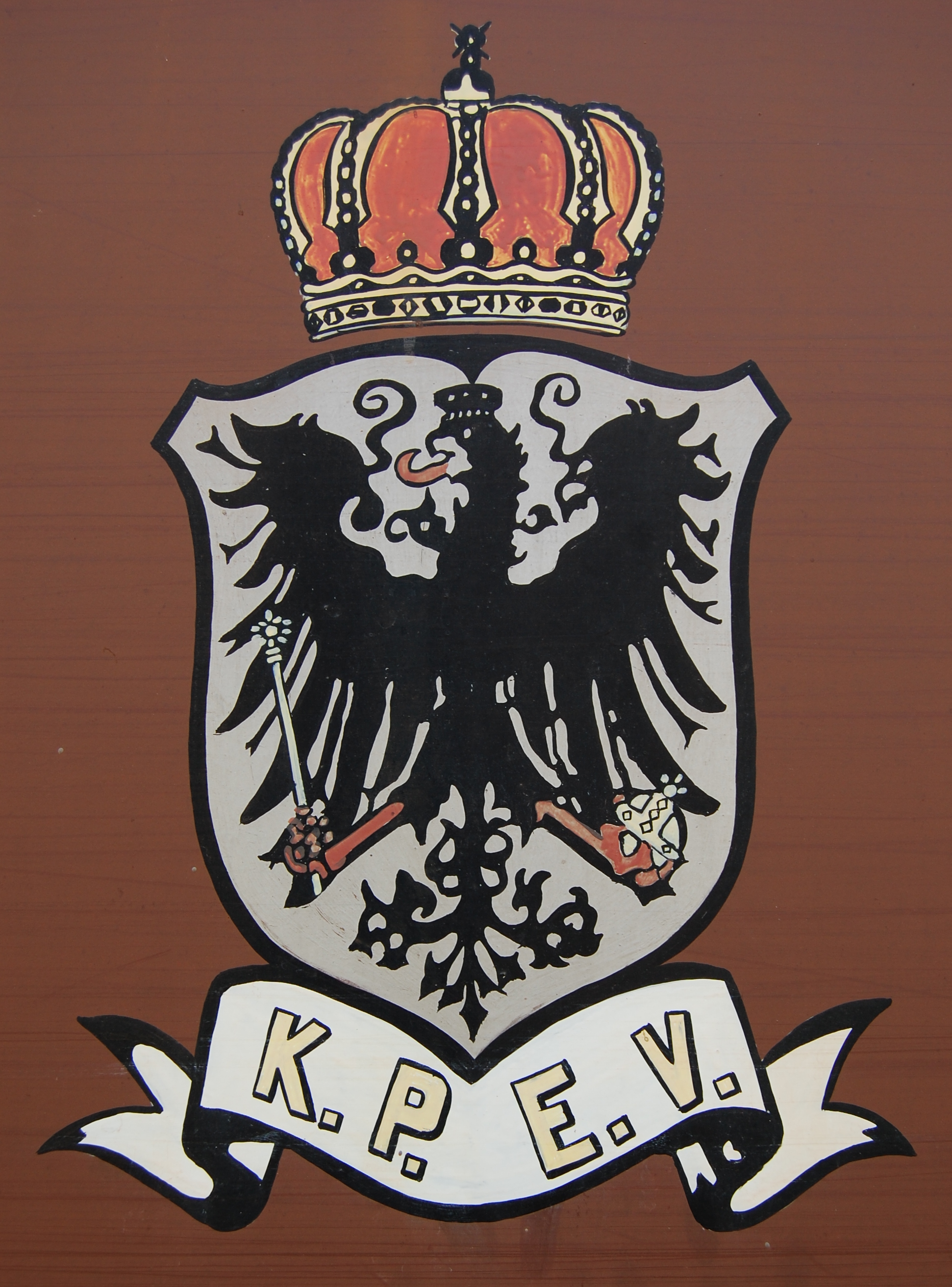
KPEV emblem on a Prussian luggage van

The term Prussian State Railways (German: Preußische Staatseisenbahnen) encompasses those railway organisations that were owned or managed by the state of Prussia. The words "state railways" are not capitalized because Prussia did not have an independent railway administration; rather the individual railway organisations were under the control of the Ministry for Trade and Commerce or its later offshoot, the Ministry for Public Works.

The official name of the Prussian rail network was Königlich Preußische Staatseisenbahnen (K.P.St.E., "Royal Prussian State Railways") until 1896, Königlich Preußische und Großherzoglich Hessische Staatseisenbahn (K.P.u.G.H.St.E., "Royal Prussian and Grand-Ducal Hessian State Railways") until the end of the First World War, and Preußische Staatsbahn (P.St.B., "Prussian State Railway") until its nationalization in 1920. A common mistake is the use of the abbreviation K.P.E.V. in supposed reference to a mythical "Royal Prussian Railway Administration" (Königlich Preußischen Eisenbahn-Verwaltung). No such entity ever existed and Prussian railway cars acquired the K.P.E.V. logo apparently through an error originating in their Cologne division.

== Overview ==
The first Prussian railways were private concerns, beginning with the Berlin-Potsdam Railway in 1838 and which was therefore known as the "Stammbahn" (roughly translates as 'original line'). The state of Prussia first financed railways around 1850. These were the Royal Westphalian Railway Company (Königlich-Westfälische Eisenbahn-Gesellschaft) and the Prussian Eastern Railway or Prussian Ostbahn (Preußische Ostbahn). In 1875 they funded two more important new railways: the Prussian Northern Railway or Prussian Nordbahn (Preußsische Nordbahn) and the Marienfelde–Zossen–Jüterbog Military Railway.

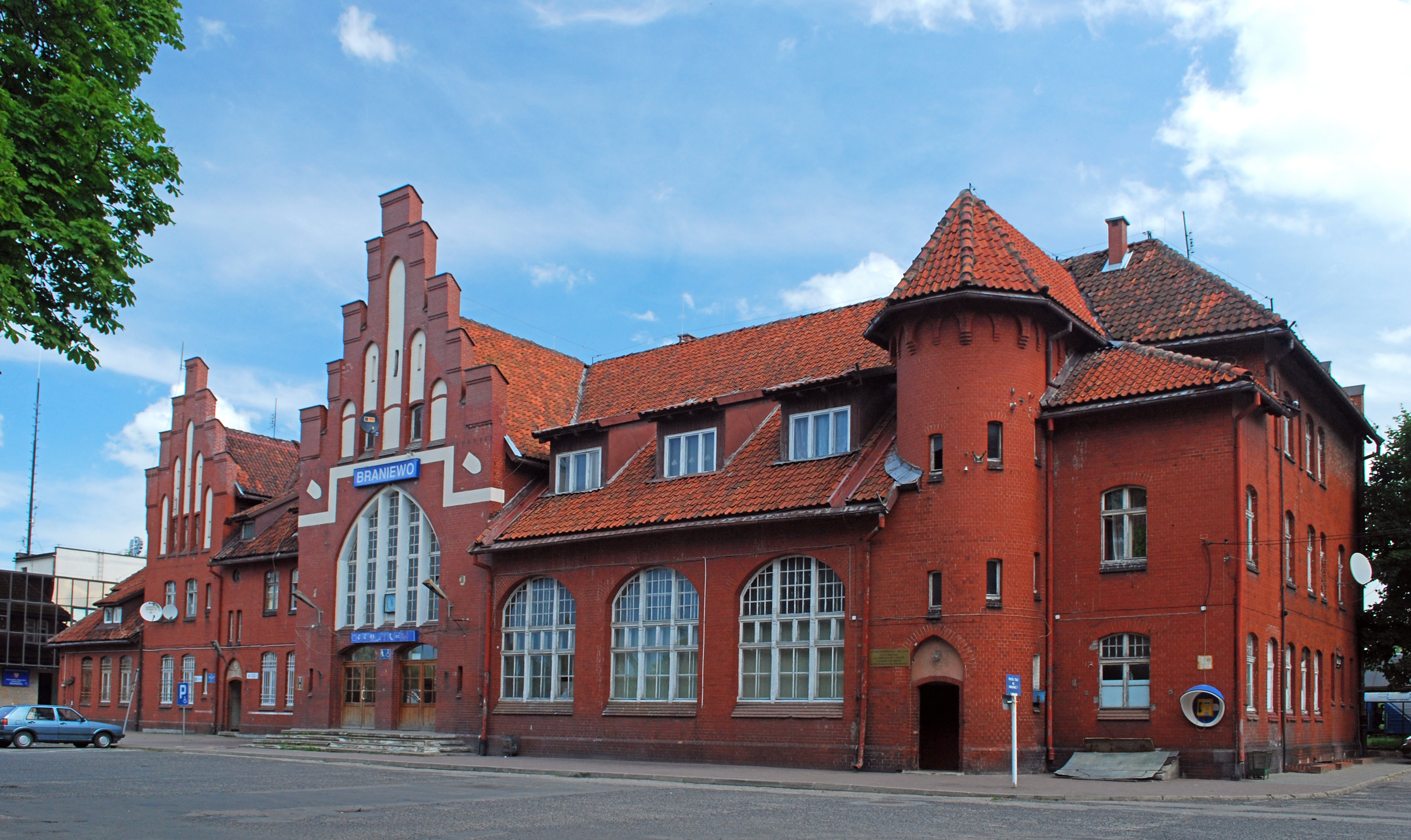
Ex-Prussian State Railways station in Braunsberg (now Braniewo, Poland).

After the Austro-Prussian War of 1866, various private, commercially oriented lines were brought under Prussian control through annexation, outright purchase or the provision of financial support depending on their situation. Between 1880 and 1889 most of the private lines were nationalised thanks to Prussia's strong financial situation making it the biggest company in Germany in 1907.

Prussia nationalized its railways in 1880 in an effort both to lower rates on freight service and to equalize those rates among shippers. Instead of lowering rates as far as possible, the government ran the railways as a profitmaking endeavour, and the railway profits became a major source of revenue for the state. The nationalization of the railways slowed the economic development of Prussia because the state favoured the relatively backward agricultural areas in its railway building. Moreover, the railway surpluses substituted for the development of an adequate tax system.

The individual railways acted as if they were independent operations and developed their own rolling stock. The extent of this independence is illustrated in an 1893 street plan of Berlin that shows the Silesian station (Berlin's departure point for the Ostbahn since 1882) and a few hundred yards apart from each other the main workshops for the Royal Berlin Division and the Royal Bromberg Division of the Ostbahn.

At the end of the First World War the network of the state-owned Prussian railways had a total length of almost 37,500 kilometres. The history of the Prussian state railways ended in 1920 with the nationalization and absorption of the various German state railways into the Imperial Railways (Reichseisenbahn), later the Deutsche Reichsbahn.

== Rolling stock ==
For a detailed listing see the List of Prussian locomotives and railbuses

=== Steam locomotives ===
==== Origin and classification ====
For the most part the locomotives listed in the Prussian classification system were not built under state direction, but independently procured by the individual railway companies. In many cases they were only brought into the Prussian railway inventory when the ownership of their respective railway organisations was later transferred to the state authorities.

This explains their unusually high numbers with about 80 classes and variants, the overwhelming majority of which were constructed between 1877 and 1895. In 1889, Prussian standards were laid down in order that the number of classes could be reduced in the future.

The division of locomotives into class variants and different designs showed a clear predominance of tank engines. These were procured in widely varying, sometimes, large quantities totally some 9000 in all. That reflects a structure that largely consisted of unconnected branch lines (Kleinbahnen) for which no long-range locomotives – i.e. tender locomotives – had to be built. In terms of pure numbers, goods locomotives dominated, representing some 12,000 out of a total fleet of around 30,000 in Prussian state ownership.

==== Classification system ====
According to Hütter and Pieper the original classification system for Prussian locomotives was largely drawn from the Prussian Eastern Railway (Prussian Ostbahn). Under that, the locomotives only had running numbers without class designation. From the locomotive's running number however its purpose could be deduced based on the following allocation of numbers:

First Prussian Steam Locomotive Classification System
Type	Numbering
Uncoupled locomotives	1–99
Coupled express and passenger-train locomotives	100–499
Double-coupled goods-train locomotives	500–799
Triple-coupled goods-train locomotives	800–1399
Double-coupled tank locomotives	1400–1699
Triple-coupled tank locomotives	1700–1899
Special classes	1900–1999

Because each railway division numbered its locomotives independently using this scheme, there was a locomotive number 120, for example, almost everywhere. As a result, the name of the division was used with the number in order to distinguish them. The full designation for a locomotive with the number '120' went something like "Hannover 120" or "Cöln linksrheinisch 120". However it soon became evident that the numbering structure was too limited, because over time more locomotives entered service than its sequence of numbers had allowed for. In addition, new types of engine were produced, for which no numbers had been allocated, for example four-couplers. This resulted in locomotives being allocated unused numbers outside of their designated sequence.

This all led to the introduction of a new system in 1906. For express train, passenger train, goods train and tank locomotives the group letters 'S', 'P', 'G' and 'T' were used together with a type number that specified the main classes.

So locomotives of average power were allotted to the '3' classes: S3, P3, G3 and T3. Less powerful engines were given lower numbers and more powerful engines higher numbers. In addition, superheated steam engines were to be given an even class number, whereas wet steam engines of a similar type were to be given the number below. Later further sub-divisions were introduced that had higher numbers. Furthermore, within the classes, running numbers were arranged in clear groups. Nevertheless, the complete designation still included the division name and the running number as well as the class letters and numbers.

Classes 1 to 3 mainly comprised the old private railway locomotives, left in the order of the individual divisions. In the lower-numbered classes there were the most varied types of engine sometimes with different wheelbases. So one could not really speak of a standard classification to begin with. It was expected that over time the older locomotives would be paid off so that only the newer standard locomotives would remain, classified in a logical and orderly fashion.

The Prussian state railways were, like all other German state railways, subordinated to the authority of the German federal government after 1920 and then went into the Deutsche Reichsbahn-Gesellschaft in 1924. Quite a few of the locomotives formerly ordered by Prussia continued to be supplied until 1926 and were still defined as Prussian locomotive classes in the Reichsbahn fleet until they were eventually renumbered.

== See also ==
- Kingdom of Prussia
- List of Prussian locomotives and railbuses
- History of rail transport in Germany
- Prussian Eastern Railway Headquarters in Bydgoszcz
