= Berlin-Zehlendorf station =

Railway station in Berlin, Germany

Coordinates: 52.4310°N 13.2583°E

Berlin-Zehlendorf
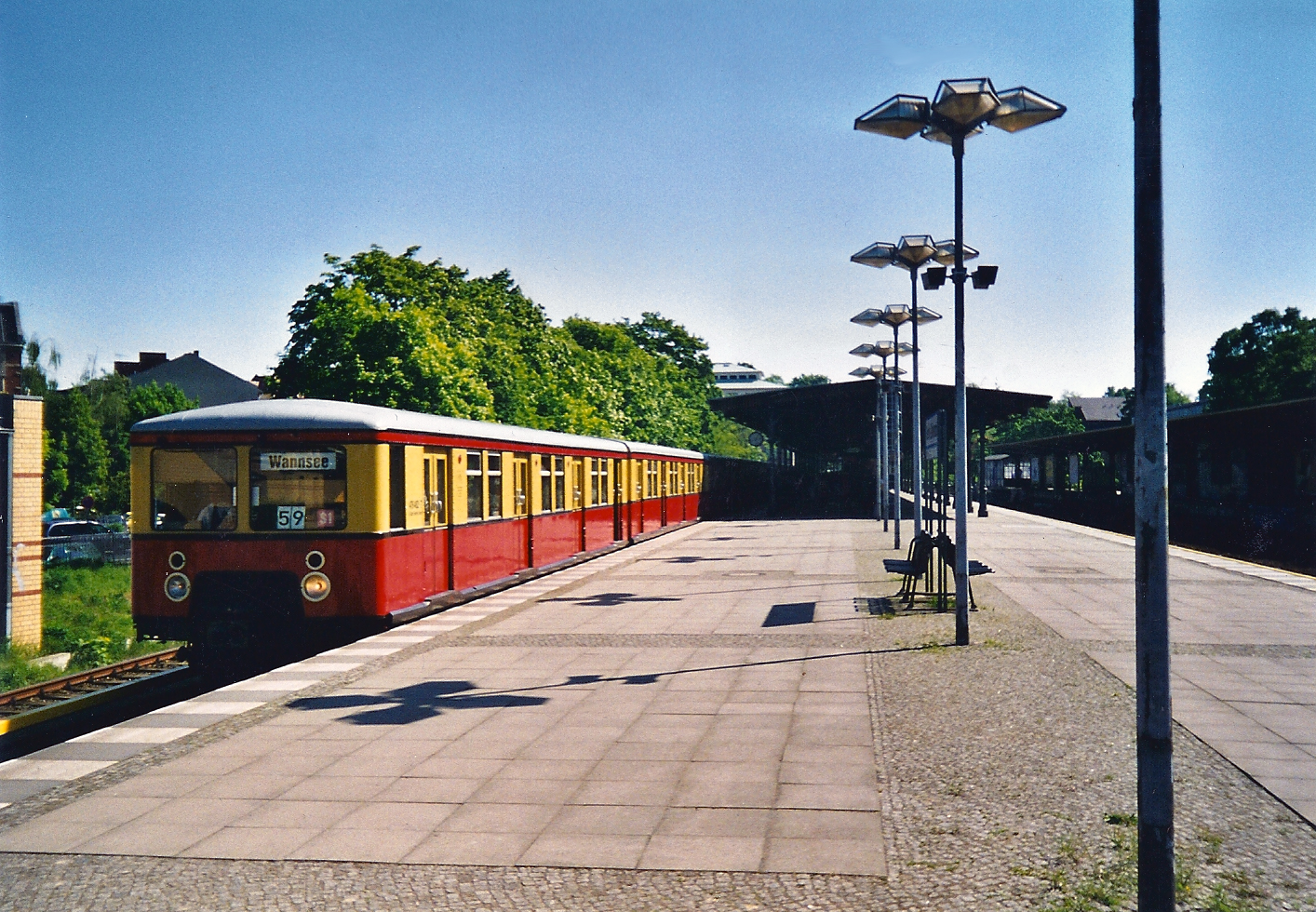

General information
- Location: Steglitz-Zehlendorf, Berlin, Berlin; Germany

Other information
- Station code: 0568
- DS100 code: BZD
- Category: 4
- Fare zone: VBB: Berlin B/5656

History
- Opened: 22 September 1838; 187 years ago 1 February 1985; 41 years ago
- Closed: 18 September 1980 by strike; officially 28 September 1980; 45 years ago
- Electrified: 15 May 1933; 93 years ago
- Former names: 1838-1891 Zehlendorf; 1891-1938 Zehlendorf-Mitte

Services
| Preceding station | Berlin S-Bahn | Following station |
|---|---|---|
| Sundgauer Straße towards Oranienburg | S1 | Mexikoplatz towards Wannsee |
Location
- Location within Berlin

Berlin-Zehlendorf (in German Bahnhof Berlin-Zehlendorf) is a railway station in southwestern Zehlendorf (Berlin) within the city of Berlin, Germany. It is served by the Berlin S-Bahn line S1 and is one of the stops of the X10, 285, 112, N84, N10, 101, 115, and 623 busses.
