= Berlin-Lichterfelde West station =

Railway station in Berlin, Germany

Coordinates: 52°26′36″N 13°17′41″E

Berlin-Lichterfelde West
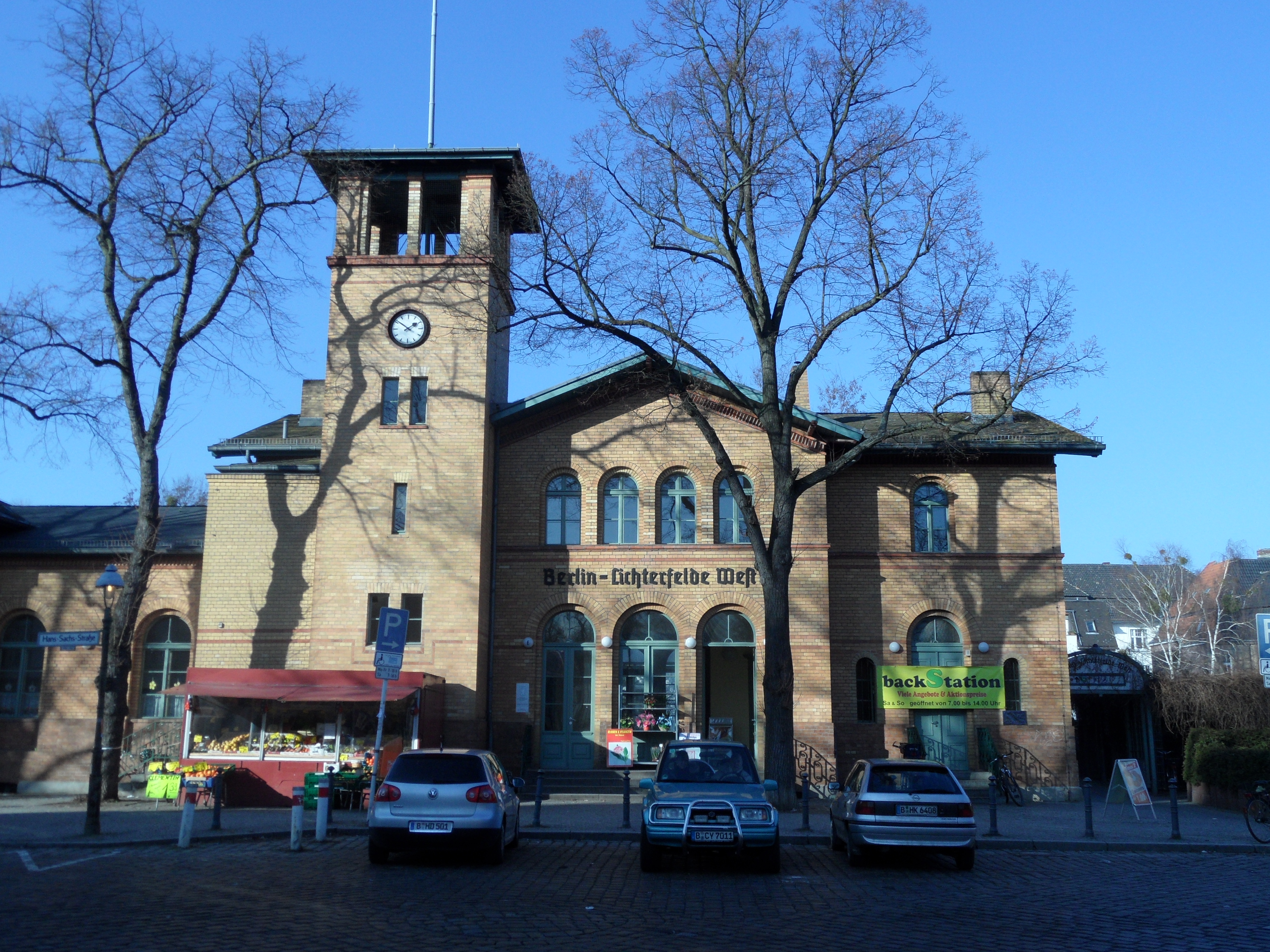

General information
- Location: Steglitz-Zehlendorf, Berlin, Berlin; Germany

Other information
- Station code: 0550
- DS100 code: BLIW
- Category: 4
- Fare zone: VBB: Berlin B/5656

Services
Preceding station	Berlin S-Bahn	Following station
Botanischer Garten towards Oranienburg	S1	Sundgauer Straße towards Wannsee
Location
- Location within Berlin

Berlin-Lichterfelde West (in German Bahnhof Berlin-Lichterfelde West) is a railway station in Lichterfelde West, within the district of Lichterfelde (Steglitz-Zehlendorf) in Berlin, Germany. It is served by the Berlin S-Bahn and several local bus lines.

The station was built in 1872 in the style of a Tuscan villa as a train station for the elegant development of Villenkolonie Lichterfelde West, a newly created expensive residential area for wealthy Berliners.

From 1946 until 1993 Lichterfelde West was the terminus of the Duty-Train of the United States Forces in Berlin. as this was near their bases.

On 9 January 1984, S-Bahn services were taken over by BVG. This initially operated a 21-kilometre-long truncated network, but gradually put some of the lines that had been closed in 1980 into operation, including the Wannseebahn on 1 February 1985. The comprehensive refurbishment of the line was started immediately after the takeover. Some areas that had been neglected for decades were repaired, such as the station building, which had been damaged in a fire in 1965. However, the left side wing could not be saved.

The wooden sculpture ‘’Flora von Lichterfelde‘’ by the Berlin-based sculptor Wolf van Roy has stood in the centre of the station concourse since 1986. A citizens‘ initiative centred around Nils Seethaler has been campaigning since 2022 for the restoration and reinstallation of the sculpture, which has since been relocated.

== Connection ==
The S-Bahn station is served by the S1 line of the Berlin S-Bahn. There are connections to the Omnibus lines 101, 188, M11, M48 and N88 of the BVG.
