= Berlin Sundgauer Straße station =

Railway station in Steglitz-Zehlendorf, Germany

Coordinates: 52°26′11″N 13°16′26″E

Sundgauer Straße
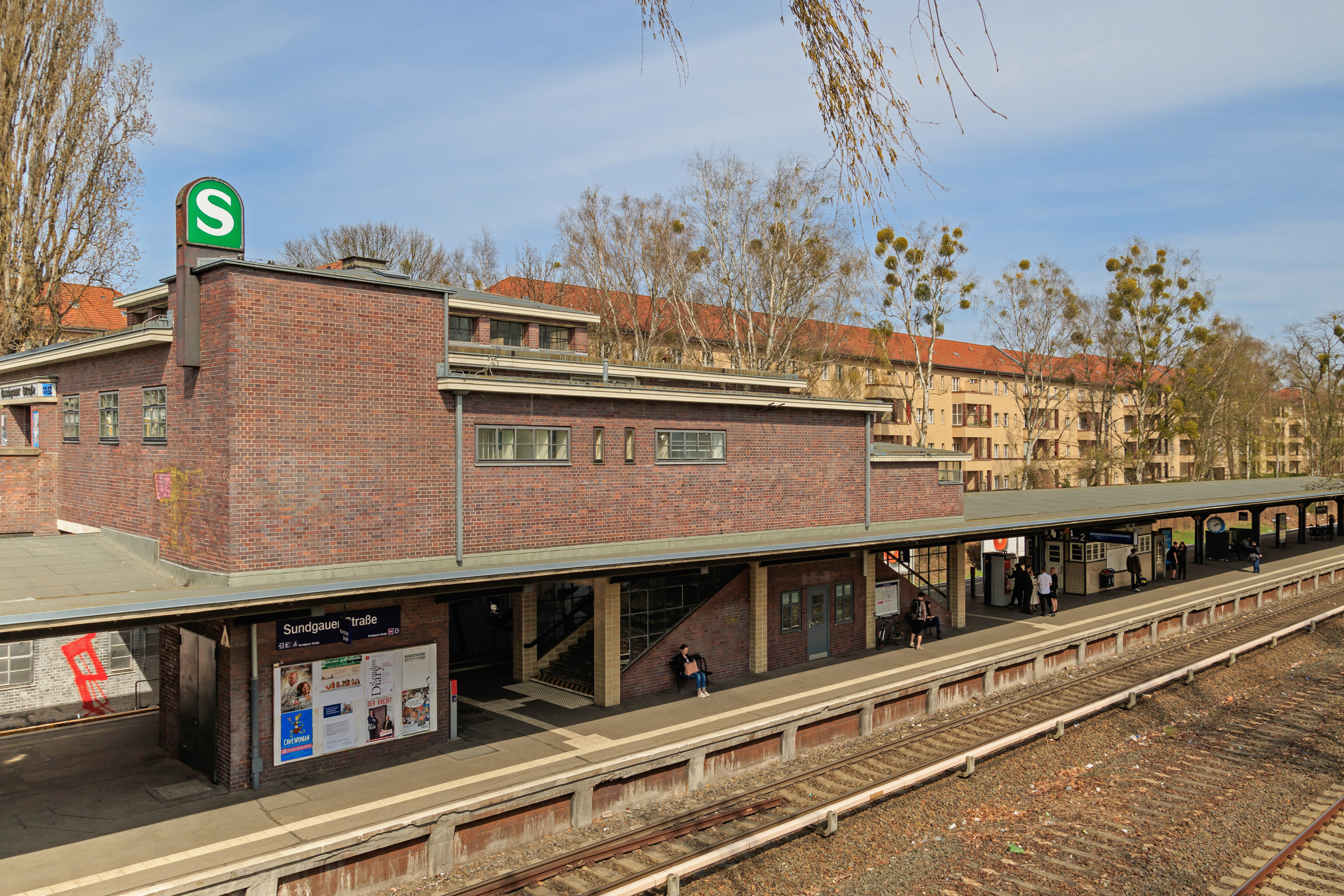

General information
- Location: Steglitz-Zehlendorf, Berlin, Berlin; Germany
- Owner: DB Netz
- Operator: DB Station&Service

Other information
- Station code: 6123
- DS100 code: BSDG
- Category: 4
- Fare zone: VBB: Berlin B/5656

Services
Preceding station	Berlin S-Bahn	Following station
Lichterfelde West towards Oranienburg	S1	Zehlendorf towards Wannsee
Location
- Location within Berlin

Berlin Sundgauer Straße (in German Bahnhof Berlin Sundgauer Straße) is a railway station in the Zehlendorf locality of Berlin, Germany, served by the Berlin S-Bahn and a local bus line.

The station opened on 1 July 1934 during the electrification of the Wannseebahn suburban railway line, originally laid in 1891. The entrance building is a protected landmark. Both the station and the adjacent street are named after the Sundgau region in France.

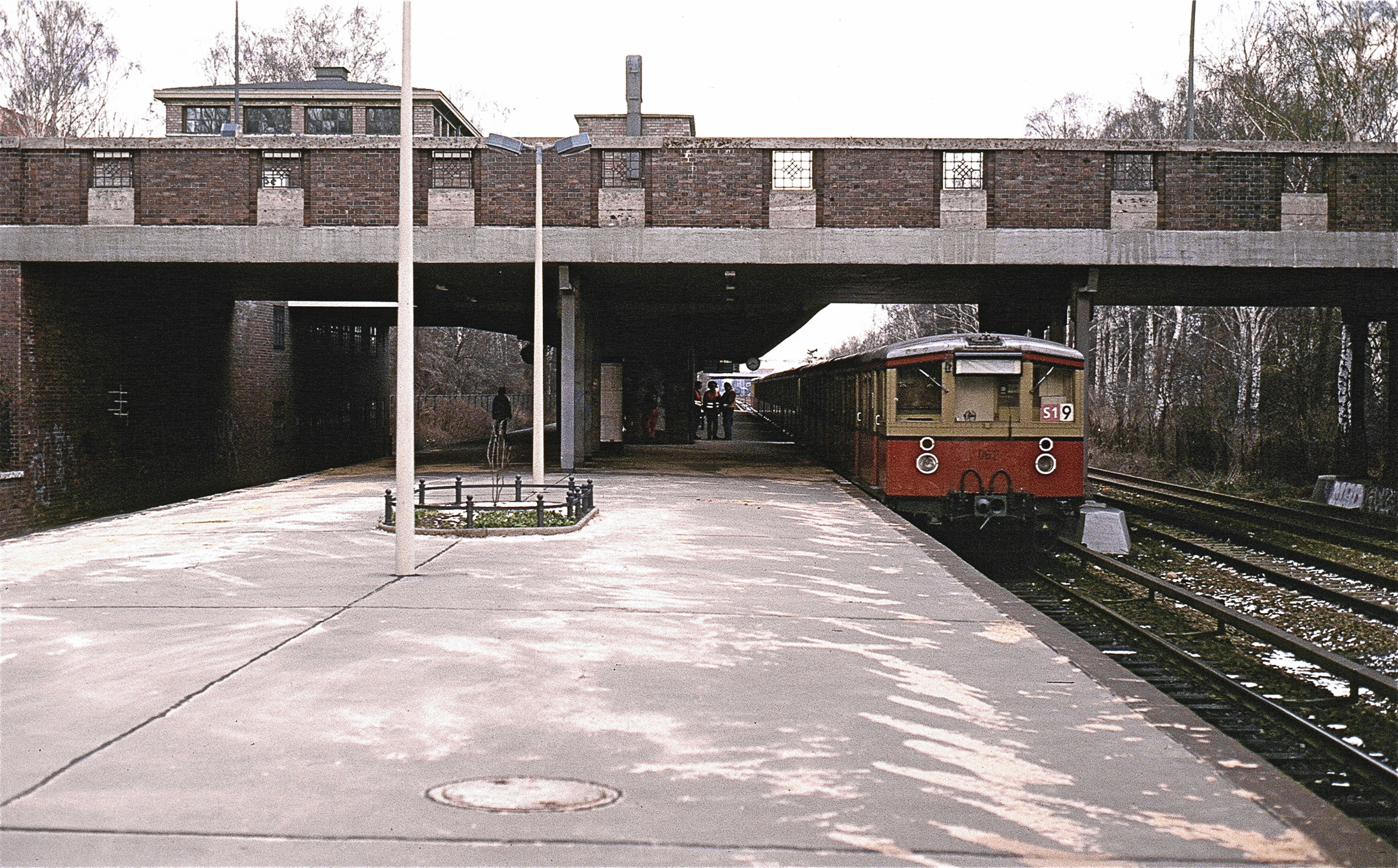
Sundgauer Straße station in 1993.
