= Royal Prussian Railway Administration =

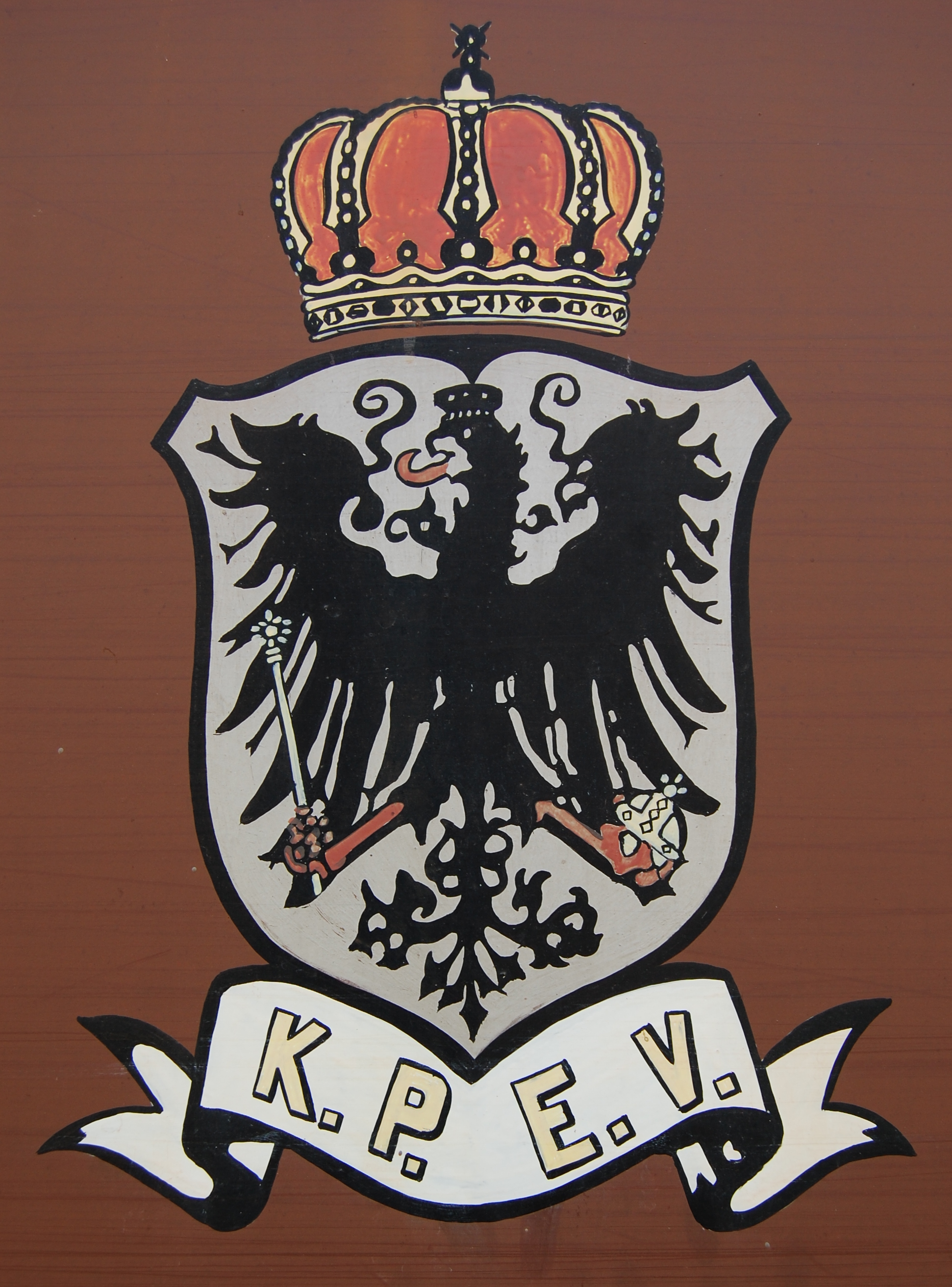
KPEV Emblem on a Prussian luggage van

The title Royal Prussian Railway Administration (Königlich Preußische Eisenbahn-Verwaltung) or KPEV is often mistakenly used to describe the Prussian state railways (Preußische Staatseisenbahn).

The initials KPEV are found on cast wagon plaques with the coat of arms, and appear to have been designed by an official of the Cologne (Coeln) division and then unwittingly adopted by the other divisions. No organisation with the name Royal Prussian Railway Administration actually existed, but its German name and the abbreviation KPEV has been used widely by railway fans since about 1970.

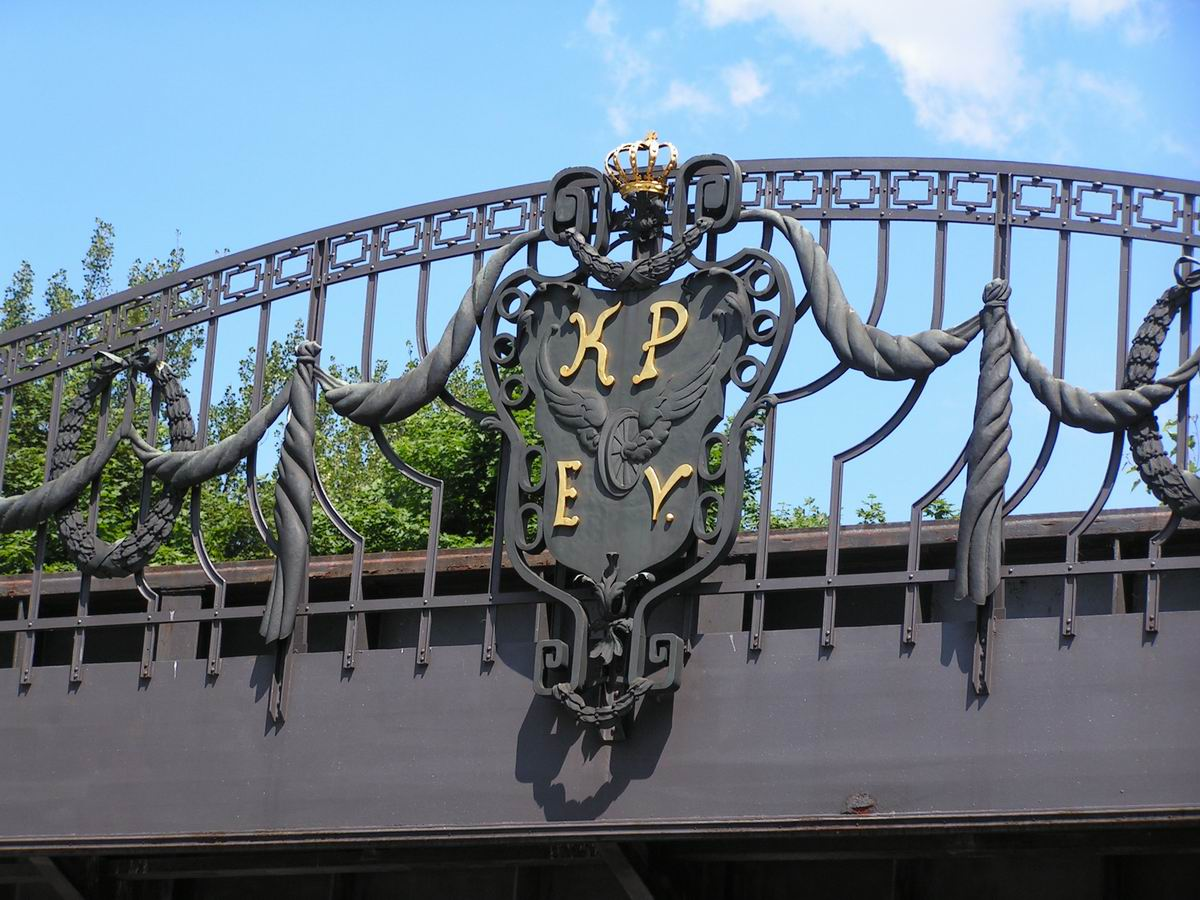
KPEV shield on the S-Bahn bridge at Berlin's Mexicoplatz

The largely independent railway divisions in Prussia reported directly to the Ministry of Public Works. The correct title for the railways in Prussia was at first the Royal Prussian State Railways (Königlich Preußische Staatseisenbahnen). In 1896 it became the Prussian-Hessian State Railways (Preußisch-Hessische Staatseisenbahnen) and after the First World War, the Prussian State Railway (Preußische Staatsbahn).

The individual divisions or "royal railway divisions" (Königliche Eisenbahndirektionen) were abbreviated to KED and later ED. These are found in contemporary official documents, unlike the abbreviation KPEV.

The organisation and history of the railways of the Kingdom of Prussia are found in the article on the Prussian state railways.

== Sources ==
- Andreas Wagner, Dieter Bäzold, Rainer Zschech, Ralph Lüderitz: Lokomotiv-Archiv Preußen 1 - Schnellzug- und Personenzuglokomotiven transpress, Berlin 1990, ISBN 3-344-00470-0 S. 29
