= Havelbus =

Havelbus Verkehrsgesellschaft mbH Potsdam
- Founded: 1992
- Headquarters: Potsdam
- Service area: Potsdam, Potsdam-Mittelmark, Havelland
- Service type: Bus
- Alliance: VBB
- Routes: 86
- Stops: 2,250 approx.
- Fleet: 213 buses
- Annual ridership: 18 Million
- Chief executive: Dieter Schäfer
- Website: www.havelbus.de

Havelbus Kickers
- Full name: SV Havelbus Kickers
- Ground: Sportplatz Berliner Straße
- Capacity: 2,000
- League: Kreisklasse Stadtklasse (Havelland-Mitte) (XIII)
- 2008-09: Kreisklasse Stadtklasse (Havelland-Mitte) (XIII), 3rd

Havelbus, or Havelbus Verkehrsgesellschaft mbH, is the largest bus operating company in Brandenburg, Germany, serving the areas of Potsdam, Potsdam-Mittelmark and Havelland.

Prices are regulated by the regional transport association VBB.

== Havelbus Kickers ==
The company also operates a football club in the Havelland-Mitte Stadtklasse, the SV Havelbus Kickers.
